= Kullu Dussehra =

Popular festival celebrated in the state of Himachal Pradesh, India

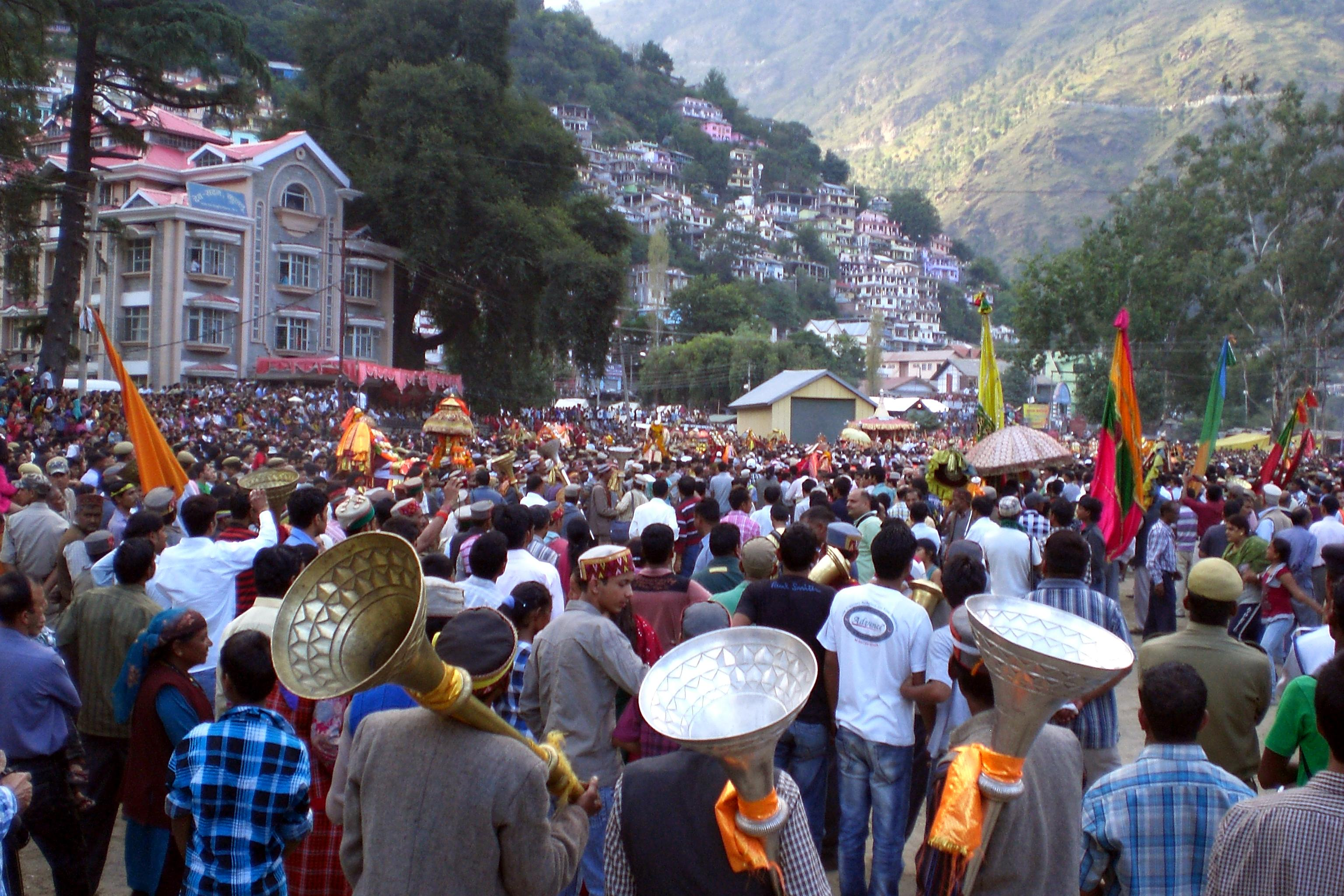
- Kullu Dussehra of Himachal Pradesh, India
- Type: Ethnic, Festive
- Significance: Congregation of Deities
- Celebrations: Nati (dance), food, music, rituals, folk flavour of the festivity, dancing

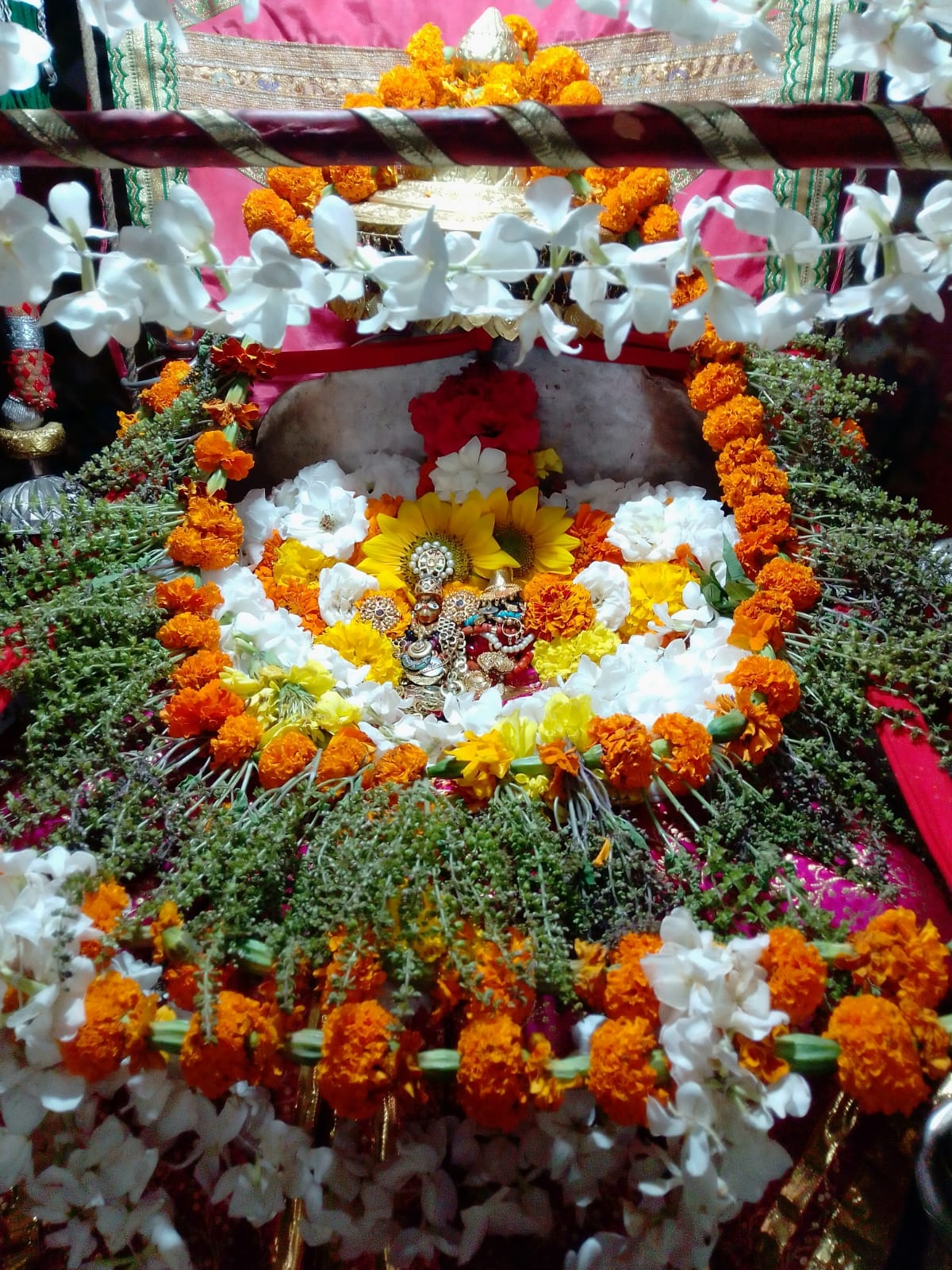
Idols of Raghunathji and Mata Sita

Kullu Dussehra is the renowned International Mega Dussehra festival observed in the month of October in Himachal Pradesh state in northern India wherein more than 4-5 lakh(400,000-500,000) people visit the fair from all across the Globe. It is celebrated in the Dhalpur maidan in the Kullu valley. Dussehra at Kullu commences on the tenth day of the rising moon, i.e. on 'Vijay Dashmi' day itself and continues for seven days. Its history dates back to the 17th century when local King Jagat Singh installed an idol of Raghunath on his throne as a mark of penance. After this, god Raghunath was declared as the ruling deity of the Valley. The State government has accorded the status of International festival to the Kullu Dussehra, which attracts tourists in large numbers.

== History of Kullu Dussehra ==
According to the legend, after his return from a pilgrimage, Maharishi Jamdagni went to his hermitage at Malana. On his head he carried a basket filled with eighteen images of different gods. Crossing through Chanderkhani pass, he came upon a fierce storm. Struggling to stay on his feet, Maharishi Jamdagni's basket was thrown from his head, scattering the images to many distant places. Hill people, finding these images saw them take shape or form as Gods, and began to worship them. Legend has it that deity worship began in the Kullu Valley.

Raja Jagat Singh ruled over the prosperous and beautiful kingdom of Kullu. As the ruler, the Raja learned of a peasant by the name of Durgadatta who apparently possessed many beautiful pearls. The Raja thought he should have these treasured pearls, even though the only pearls Durgadatta had were pearls of Knowledge. But the Raja in his greed ordered Durgadatta to hand over his pearls or be hanged. Knowing of his inevitable fate at the hands of the king, Durgadatta threw himself on the fire and cursed the king, "Whenever you eat, your rice will appear as worms, and water will appear as blood". Doomed by his fate, the Raja sought solace and searched out advice from a Ramanandi saint Krishnadas Payahari who belonged to Dahima/Dadhich Brahmin family. Shri Krishnadas Payahari told him that in order to eradicate the curse, he must retrieve the deity of Ragunath from Ram's kingdom. Desperate, the king sent a Brahmin to Ayodhya. Later the Brahmin stole the deity and set out on his journey back to Kullu. The people of Ayodhya, finding their beloved Ragunath missing, set out in search of the Kullu Brahmin. On the banks of the Saryu river, they approached the Brahmin and asked him why he had taken Ragunath ji. The Brahmin recounted the story of the Kullu king. The people of Ayodhya attempted to lift Ragunath, but their deity became incredibly heavy when headed back towards Ayodhya, and became very light when headed to Kullu. On reaching Kullu Ragunath was installed as the reigning deity of the Kullu kingdom. After installing the deity of Raghunath, Raja Jagat Singh drank the Charan-Amrit of the deity and the curse was lifted. Jagat Singh became Lord Ragunath's regent. This legend is connected with the Dussehra at Kullu. This deity is taken in a Ratha to the Dussehra. It started in 1606 and continues till now.

== Recent Developments ==
=== 2026 ===
The 2026 International Kullu Dussehra, held from 21 to 27 October, introduced several new technological and international cultural attractions. For the first time, the festival featured a 500-drone light show at Dhalpur Ground. The approximately 30-minute presentation depicted episodes from the Ramayana, including Lord Rama's exile and the burning of Lanka, alongside imagery representing Himachali culture. A laser light show was also introduced as part of the festival's evening attractions.

The festival also expanded its international cultural programme through a Global Dance event featuring artists from approximately 15 countries, alongside performers from Ladakh, Spiti and other parts of Himachal Pradesh. The programme presented traditional music and dance from different regions and countries.

Preparations for the 2026 festival also included the renovation of Lal Chand Prarthi Kala Kendra, the introduction of additional lighting arrangements, and plans for improved visitor facilities and traffic management.

== Notable Attendees ==
On 5 October 2022, Prime Minister Narendra Modi became the first sitting prime minister of India to participate in the International Kullu Dussehra festival. He attended the Rath Yatra procession and paid obeisance to Lord Raghunath at the Dhalpur Ground in Kullu.

== Visitor Information ==
=== How to Reach Kullu ===
- By Air: Nearest airport is Bhuntar Airport, located about 10 km from Kullu.
- By Road: Accessible via NH3 from Delhi, Chandigarh, Mandi, and Manali.
- By Train: Nearest railway stations are at Joginder Nagar and Chandigarh.
