= Krishnadas Payahari =

16th-century Ramanandi Hindu religious leader

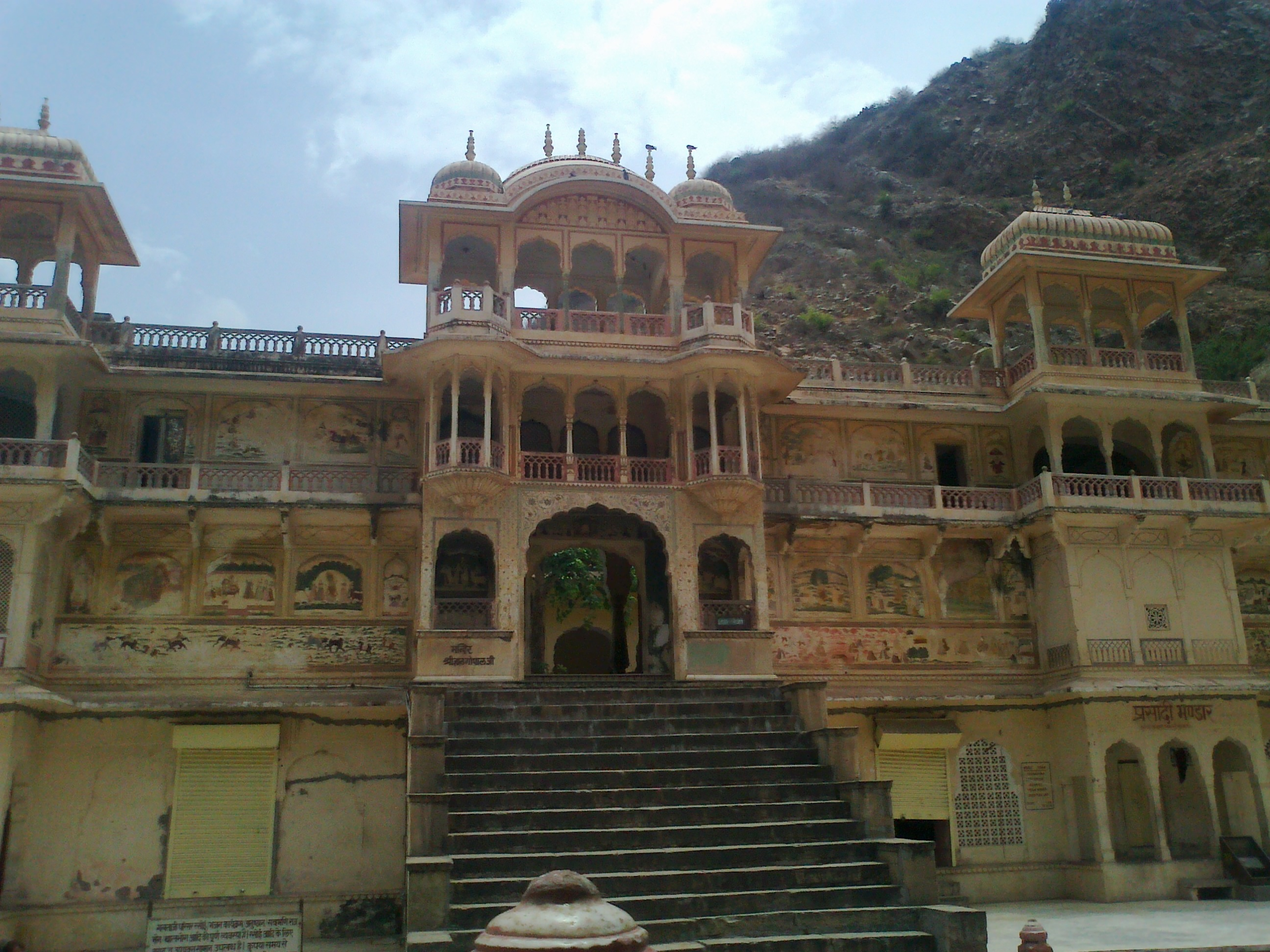

Personal life
- Notable work(s): Brahmgita, Premtattva Nirupan, Jugalman Charit
- Honors: Payahari Baba

Religious life
- Religion: Hinduism
- Sect: Ramanandi Sri Vaishnavism (deity Rama), Hinduism

Religious career
- Teacher: Bhakt Anantananda
- Disciples: Shri Bhagwanji of Pindori dham, Shri Kilhadeva of Galtaji dham, Shri Agradasji of Raiwasa dham, Raja Prithvi Singh of Amber and his wife Rani Apurva Devi, Bawa Lal Dayal of Dhianpur Dham, Baba Ram Thaman of Kasur

Krishnadas Payahari (Sanskrit: कृष्णदास पयहारी, romanized: Kṛṣṇadās Payahārī), also known as Payahari Baba, was a Ramanandi Hindu saint and disciple of Anantananda, one of the twelve disciples of Ramananda (the founder of Ramanandi Sampradaya). Krishnadas Payohari was the founder and first Mahant of Gaddi of Galtaji dham, Jaipur (one of the 36 Dwara/Gates of Vaishanavism held by Ramanandis). He came to Galta early in the 16th century. He was the guru of Prithvi Singh, ruler of Amber (Jaipur) and his wife Apurva Devi (Bala Bai). He was also guru of Raja Jagat Singh of Kullu.

== Life ==
Krishnadas Payahari was born in a Dahima Brahmin (Dadhich Brahmin) family of Rajasthan. He was a followed bramcharya right from his childhood. It is believed that he used to consume only milk for his sustenance since his birth, hence he was also known as Payahari/Payohari, literally meaning one who thrives on milk. Bhaktamal (lit. rosary/garland of devotees) written by Nabha Dass mentions an incident about life of Krishnadas Payahari where he showed his disciple, Prithviraj Kachhawaha, darshan of Dwarikanath Krishna while remaining in Amber.

आमेर अछत कूरम कौ द्वारिकानाथ दरसन दियौ। श्रीकृष्णदास उपदेस, परम तत्त्व परचौ पायौ॥

The Lord of Dvārikā gave darśana to Pṛthvīrāja Kachavāhā while he remained in Amer. Kṛṣṇadāsa Payahāri gave him upadeśa and caused him to know the highest essence."

— Bhaktamala

== Lineage ==
Krishnadas Payahari belonged to Ramanandi sampradaya and was a disciple of Anantananda who was one of the twelve disciples of Ramananda. Krishnadas Payahari had twenty three main disciples out of whom the three prominent were Agradas, Kilhadev and Bhagwan of Pandori dham in Gurdaspur. Agradas became guru of the Vaishnav saint Nabha dass who was the author of Bhaktamal.

In Bhaktamal, while explaining the lineage of Tulsidas, the author of Ramacharitmanas, Nabha das makes a mention of Krishnadas Payahari and indirectly his lineage too.

अनंतानंद पद परसि के लोकपालसे ते भये । गयेश करमचंद अल्ह पयहारी ॥
सारीरामदास श्रीरंग अवधि गुण महिमा भारी । तिनके नरहरि उदित ॥

“By touching the feet of Anantānand, his disciples Gayēśa, Karamachand, Alhadās, Krishnadas Payahārī, Sārīrāmadās, śrīrangāchārya became equal to Loka-paals in virtues and glory! Thereafter Narharidās appeared as the disciple of śrīrangāchārya.”

— [Bhakta-maal, Chhappay 37 by Nabha das ji]

It is said that the Ramanandi saint of Punjab Shri Bhagwanji became disciple Krishnadas Payahari ji, who initiated him into Ramanandi tradition.

== Legacy ==
Krishnadas is remembered as the first Ramanandi who established the Ramanandi centre at Galtaji in Rajasthan and hence strengthened Ram Bhakti (devotion of the god Rama) in Northern India. The memory of Krishnadas Payahari's influence as a Vaishnav saint is one that extends even beyond Galta in Rajasthan and the Kullu Valley in Himachal.

=== Founder of Galtaji Peeth ===
Built within a mountain pass in the Aravalli Hills 10 km east of Jaipur, located is the shrine of Galtaji peeth which is one of the 52 dwaras (gates) of Vaishnavism. Since the early 15th century Galtaji had been a retreat for Hindu ascetics belonging to the Vaishnava Ramanandi Samaprdaya. Payahari Krishnadas came to Galta in the early 15th century and became head of Galta gaddi replacing earlier yogis in the place. The fame and popularity of Galtaji increased and it has become a major pilgrimage for Ramanandi Hindus.

=== Establishment of Sita-Rama and Narasimha icons ===
Krishnadas Payahari was instrumental in establishing two deities: Sita-Rama (Rama with his consort Sita) and Narasimha. Sita-Rama was one of the four deities which protected, secured and legitimized Kachawaha rulers. The icon of Sita-Rama is to this day housed at Sita-Ram-dwara located in the precincts of City Palace of Jaipur.

The image of Narasimha, which was presented to Raja Prithvi Singh of Amber, is housed at old fort of Amber.

=== Initiation of Bhagwan of Pandori dham, Gurdaspur, Punjab ===
As per Ramanandi tradition, Krishnadas Payahari selected a local Dogra Khajuria Brahmin known as Bhagwan, to spread Vaishnavism in Punjab plains and Hindu hill states of Jammu and Himachal. Bhagwan was born at Kahnuwan in Gurdaspur and established the Ramanandi centre at Pandori Mahantan village, also located in Gurdaspur. During his childhood, Bhagwan went to Galtaji for pilgrimage, where he met Krishnadas Payahari. Krishnadas initiated him into Ramanandi Vaishnavism and made him a disciple.

=== Institutionalizing Kullu Dussehra ===
The Kullu Dussehra tradition has links with Ramanandi traditions of Krishnadas Payahari and his disciple of Bhagwan of Gurdaspur. Krishnadas managed to persuade Raja Jagat Singh of Kullu to bring Raghunath murti (from Tretanath temple Ayodhya), in whose honour Kullu Dusshera is celebrated. He also established a centre at Naggar in Kullu.

== Disciples ==
Krishnadas Payahari's disciples included famous personalities in Ramanandi Hindu history. Many of his disciples were from Jammu, Himachal & Punjab region.

1. Kilhadeva was his prominent disciple who later on became second head of Galtaji peeth.
2. Agradeva who is associated with Raiwasa dham and who was guru of Nabha Dass was also Payahari's foremost disciple.
3. Bhagwanji, a Dogra Khajuria Brahmin, was the founder of Thakurdwara at Pandori dham in Gurdaspur, Punjab.
4. Bawa Lal Dayal, a Hindu Ramanandi Khatri saint from Punjab and founder of Dhianpur Dham and several daughter branches in India.
5. Ram Thaman, a Hindu Ramanandi Khatri from Punjab who was founder of Ramanandi seat in West Punjab.
6. Raja Prithviraj of Amber who was father of Bharmal.
7. Rani Apoorva Devi, wife of Raja Prthiviraj of Amber.

== Literary works ==
There are three texts which have been attributed to Krishnadas Payahari and these include: Brahmgita, Premtatva Nirupan, Jugalman Charit.

== See also ==
- Ramanandacharya
- Ramanandi Sampradaya
- Kilhadeva
- Galta ji dham
- Thakurdwara Bhagwan Narainji
- Goswami Nabha Das
- Bhaktamala
