= Nabha Dass =

Ramanandi Vaishnava Bhakti poet-saint from India

Goswami Nabha Dass
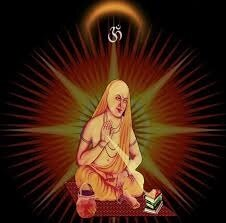
- Goswami Nabha Das

Personal life
- Born: Narayan Dass; 8 April 1537 Bhadrachalam, Qutb Shahi dynasty (Present-day Bhadradri Kothagudem district, Telangana)
- Died: 1643 (aged 105–106)
- Era: 16th century
- Notable work: Bhaktamal
- Honours: Goswami

Religious life
- Religion: Hinduism
- Philosophy: Vishishtadvaita
- Sect: Ramanandi Sampradaya

Religious career
- Teacher: Sant Shri Agradasji of Raiwasa Dham and Shri Kilhadev ji of Galta Dham: Disciples of Shri Krishnadas Payahari ji

Nabha Dass (born Narayan Dass), was a Hindu saint, theologian and author of the Bhaktamal. In this sacred scripture, Nabha Das wrote the life history of almost every saint ranging from the Satya Yuga to the Kali Yuga age. Nabha Dass wrote ‘Bhakatmal’ in 1585. Nabha Dass, a saint belonging to the tradition of Ramananda. On his birthday 8 April, millions of followers remember him and his resolve to work for humanity.

Punjab declares 8 April as gazetted holiday on Nabha Dass's birth anniversary

== Early life ==
- He was born on 8 April 1537 at village Bhadrachalam on the bank of the Godavari River in Khammam district in the Indian state of Telangana.
- His mother was Smt. Janaki Devi ji and his father was Shri Ramdass ji, now known as Ramdassu.
- Guru Nabha Dass belonged to Mahasha or Doom or Dumna community now known as Nabhadassia.
  - People from this community are also known as Nabhadassias. Their professional work was to make baskets and grain storage containers with bamboo. People from this community are also good musicians because they were involved in Satsang's playing different kinds of instruments. They were strong devotees of Lord Rama, because Rama's temple was situated at Bhadrachalam, now known as Rambhadrachalam.
- His parents initially had no children, leading the villagers to taunt them. They prayed for Lord Rama to bless them with a son, who would be learned, intellectual and a theologian. Then a son was born to them. He was first called Narayan Dass and was a devotee of Lord Rama. His parents died when he was five years old. He lived alone in the village and worshiped in the temple. He played on the bank of the river with his friends and also exchanged sand ladoo into the sweet ladoo with blessing from God.

== Spiritual journey ==
- Saint Shri Agar Dass ji and Keel Dass were passing through near Ram Bhadrachalam hills and forests. They saw Narayan Dass under a tree.
  - They asked him, "Who are you? Why are you sitting here?
    - " Narayan told them, "I am made of five elements blessed from God".
  - They were surprised to hear his spiritual reply. They asked him if he wanted to go to their temple. Keeldass scattered water on his eyes, then he opened his eyes and got a blessing.
  - They brought him into the temple at Ghalta Dham at Jaipur.
  - Guru Agar Dass ji offered a duty to him: to serve the pilgrims who come to hear Satsang and operate hand fan when I am preaching and teaching into the Satsang hall for devotees.
- One day, Guru Agardas was not concentrated to the Satsung because his one disciple (Hari Dass) who was a business person through the ship into sea way. His ship was sinking beneath a cyclone. He prayed before Guru Agardas to save his ship. Narayanadass was looking at his guru who he was not concentrating into the Satsung. He rapidly flapped the fan to save the ship.
  - Narayanadass said to his Guru, "your focus on the Satsung freed the ship from cyclone".
  - Guru opened his eyes and told him, "How did you understand my internal feeling, you are a great holy saint; now your name will be Nabha dass, now you will not operate fan. You will write life history of holy saints who come on the earth from Satya Yuga to Kali Yuga".
- Then he wrote the life history of many saints with a boon from his Guru. Guru Agardass told his elder holy saint Shri Keeldass, who had written life history of many saints by Nabha Dass. He was happy and told him, "you are great holy writer, and also deserve to get a degree of doctorate of Literature. We should arrange a religious function here and invite all holy saints to give blessing to your religious achievements".
- He said to him, "you should go to Varanasi for holy dip into Ganga". He invited all holy saints. When he was going to Varanasi he passed through Ayodhya where the Lord Rama temple was situated. He stayed there for a few days. He went to the temple where a religious programme was underway. The saints were singing hymns. When the temple clergy told Nabha Dass to preach a hymn. Other sage persons objected that he did not belong to the sage community and asked how can you allow him. The priest told them that anyone can sing a hymn.
  - Before starting Nabha Dass said, "jaat na puchhie saadh ki, poochh leejie gyan, mol karo kirpan ka, pari rahne do mian" ("do not ask caste, religion from holy saints, ask about enlightenment of the God"). (Bhagat Bhagti Bhagwan Guru Chatur Naam Baap Ek Inke Pad Bandan Kiye Nasin Vigan Anek).
  - He sung devotee, devotion, Guru, God. They are the same and are respectable Idols. The sages were surprised to hear his preaching. They called to him with respect. The Priest asked him, "Where are you going?"
    - He said, "I am going to Varanasi for holy dip into the Ganga. I invited all sage and holy saints to come at Ghalta Dham where to held religious ceremony for releasing the sacred scripture written by me with blessing from the Guru & God." All saints accepted his message and celebrated him for his religious work.
- He went to the Ganga to bathe. He went to Mathura, Vrindavan to worship at the Lord Krishna temple and also met sage Shri Tulsidass, who had written the Ramayana. He was surprised to learn about Nabha Dass and asked how Nabh Dass could write sacred scripture, because he did not belong to sage community nor was he a Learned Theologian. Nabha Dass came back to Ghalta Dham. Tulsidass and other holy saints were thinking about Nabha Dass' works.
- The sages were unhappy about his prominence and hatched a conspiracy against Nabha Dass. They stated that they would come there if your food is cooked with sandalwood. They knew that Nabha Dass had no sandalwood because these sandalwoods were in a forest with snakes in the trees will bite him and would kill him if he approached. He accepted their challenge and went into the forest with a bullock cart
  - Nabh Ddass prayed before the snakes that were there. Nabha Dass and his disciples cut sandalwood. A lion come and killed the bullock. Nabha Dass saw this happen and put the cart before the Lion and brought the wood to Ghalta Dham. The saints came to Ghalta Dham and greeted him with a garland of flowers.
  - Tulsidass came there and sat in the last queue. When Nabha Dass saw him, he rushed to him and welcomed him saying,"I want a holy saint to make like the Sameroo". You will have like a sameroo in the Sacred scripture written by me with blessing from all saints here, the God. Then all holy saints with his Guru Shri Agardass, shri Keeldass released sacred scripture and called its name Bhaktamal in 1585, at Ghalta Dham Jaipur and also to give doctorate of literature Degree to Nabha Dass.
  - They renamed him Goswami Shri Nabha Dass Maharaj. They had written sacred scripture to bring us nearer to God. The life history of many holy saints come to Kali Yuga in Satya Yuga age.
- At the end of this ceremony, Nabha Dass left for a religious journey throughout India.
  1. He went first to Rambhadrachalam to take the blessing from his parents' temple and the temple of Lord Rama. He returned to Dhianpurdham, Pandoridham, Damtaldham.
  2. Then he went to Kulu Manali where his grand Guru Shri Krishna Pyahari Dass had a lodge. The lodge was situated in deep forest.
    - King Shri Jagat Singh and his wife were there. She was suffering from skin disease. She had no relief from doctors. The queen believed in the saints, but the king did not. Grand guru Shri Krishana heard their problem. His guru told Nabha Dass to take her near the sacred spring and take three dips in the sacred spring. After this, her skin disease was cured. Both king and queen were happy and fell on the feet of the saints. They said to them, "you are great holy saints, we want to present a gift". Krishana Pyahari Dass said to them "You may have to celebrate ten days festival to the remark of the Lord Rama on Dusehra at Kulu". From that day Kulu Dushera began to venerate both saints
  3. Nabha Dass came to Punjab through Pathankot, Gurdaspur, Jammu where his community lives.
    1. One day They received a message to come to my lodge to take blessing of my Guru, but they ignored him. No person came to listen to his hymns. He felt upset and returned to Ghalta Dham to serve in the Galtadham.
  4. After reaching Ghalta Dham to serve in the Galtadham, his guru Agardass take him to Revasha forest and they stayed there.
    1. One day King Raja Maan Singh went to the forest to hunt with 10,000 of his sainiks. They were exhausted. They saw a saint lodge and marched there. The King went in to take a blessing from the saints.
    2. Agardas told Nabha Dass to give him some parsad of banana. When Nabha Dass give him a banana,
      1. Raja Maan Singh said, "first parsad should be given to my sainiks and then after to me."
      2. Nabha Dass called the sainiks and gave them all bananas.
      3. The king was surprised that he was able to give ten-ten bananas to the soldiers, while only 10 bananas were in the basket.
      4. The King was again surprised to see this miracle.
        1. He fell down on their feet for seeking a blessing.
        2. He gave 1600 acres of land in donation for Dham and made a gate named Agardass, Nabha Dass. The gate is still situated at Revasha Dham.

== Last Days ==
- Nabha Dass died in 1643. He is venerated because his sacrifice was for the whole people.
- He lived for almost 106 years and devoted his whole life in writing.

== His connection with Punjab, Jammu and Himachal ==
- Guru Nabha Dass used to visit the temple of Thakurdwara Bhagwan Narainji in the village Pandori in Gurdaspur district where people of mahasha community live. In his celebrated Vaishnav text: Bhaktamal, Goswami Nabha Dass ji wrote about Ramanandi saints Bhagwanji and Narainji of Pandori Dham. Nabhadas' disciple Krishandas Payahari had commissioned Bhagwanji to found the Ramanandi centre of Pindori Dham in the Punjab Hills.
- Neighbouring Himachal Pradesh and Jammu and Kashmir states also have a sizeable presence of the community.
- Kullu Dussehra is celebrated for a week on the directions of Guru Nabha Dass.
- There are around 3 million people of the Mahasha community who live in Punjab, including around one lakh in Pathankot itself.

"jaat na puchhie saadh ki, poochh leejie gyan, mol karo kirpan ka, pari rahne do mian" ("do not ask caste, religion from holy saints, ask about enlightenment of the God").

== Works ==
- Guru Nabha Dass wrote ‘Bhagatmal’ in 1585, is a poem in the Braj language that gives short biographies of more than 200 bhaktas.
- His other notable works are
  1. Ramashtayam,
  2. Astayam and
  3. Ramcharitar ke paad in Braja.
