= Gillanwali (Dera Baba Nanak) =

Village in Punjab, India

Coordinates: 31°55′24″N 75°02′56″E

Gillanwali is a village in Dera Baba Nanak tehsil of Gurdaspur district, in Punjab state of India.

== Demographics ==
According to the 2011 census, Gillanwali has a population of 857 people, of which 417 were males and 440 were females. There were a total of 171 households in the village. The number of children below the age of 6 were 107, of which 57 were males and 50 females. The number of people of Scheduled castes were 194, of which 102 were males and 92 were females. The people who were literate were 560, of which 285 were males and 275 were females.

== See also ==
- Dhianpur
- Kala Afghana
