= Ramkot =

Ramkot may refer to:

- Ramkot, Jammu and Kashmir, India
- Ramkot, Nepal
- Ramkot Fort, Azad Kashmir, Pakistan
