= Pandori Dham =

Ramanandi Hindu temple in Gurdaspur district, Punjab, India

Thakurdwara Bhagwan Narainji
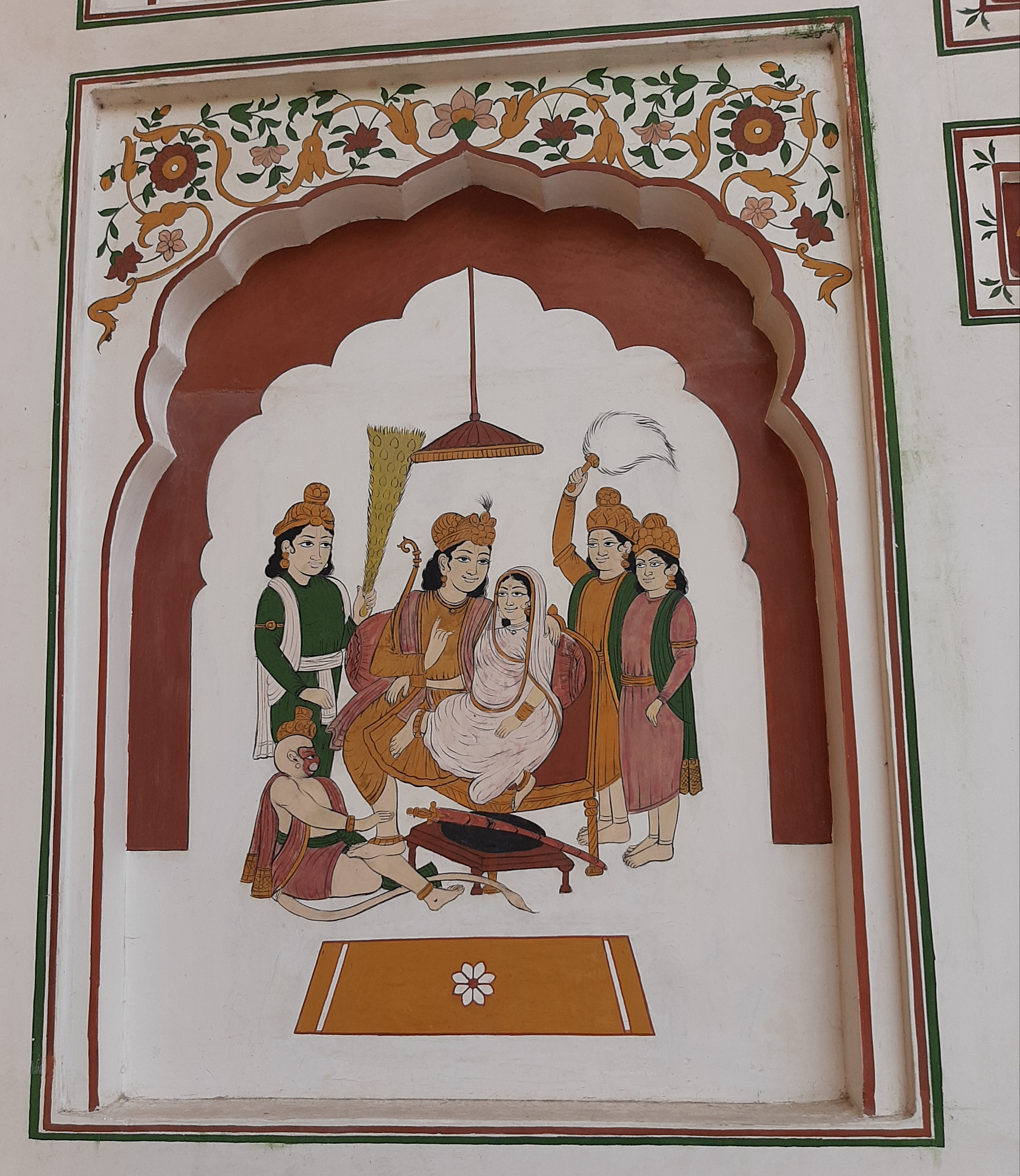
- Shri Ram panchayat painting at Thakurdwara Bhagwan Narainji

- Location in Gurdaspur, Punjab, India Pandori Dham (India)

Religion
- Affiliation: Hinduism
- District: Gurdaspur
- Deity: Shri Raghunath ji
- Festivals: Rama Navami and Baisakhi

Location
- Location: Gurdaspur
- State: Punjab
- Country: India
- Interactive map of Thakurdwara Bhagwan Narainji
- Coordinates: 32.0571°N 75.5023°E

Architecture
- Type: Rajputana

Thakurdwara Bhagwan Narainji (popularly known as Pandori Dham (Note: Alternatively spelt as 'Pindori Dham'.)) is a historical Hindu temple belonging to Ramanandi Sampradaya, located in the village Pandori Mahantan in Gurdaspur district of Punjab in India. It constitutes one of the fifty-two Vaishnav dvaras of Indian subcontinent into which Bairagis have been organized. It is a Vaishnava gaddi. The shrine was founded by Ramanandi saint Shri Bhagwanji and his disciple Shri Narainji after whom the shrine has been name. The temple is known for its Baisakhi fair.

== History and tradition ==
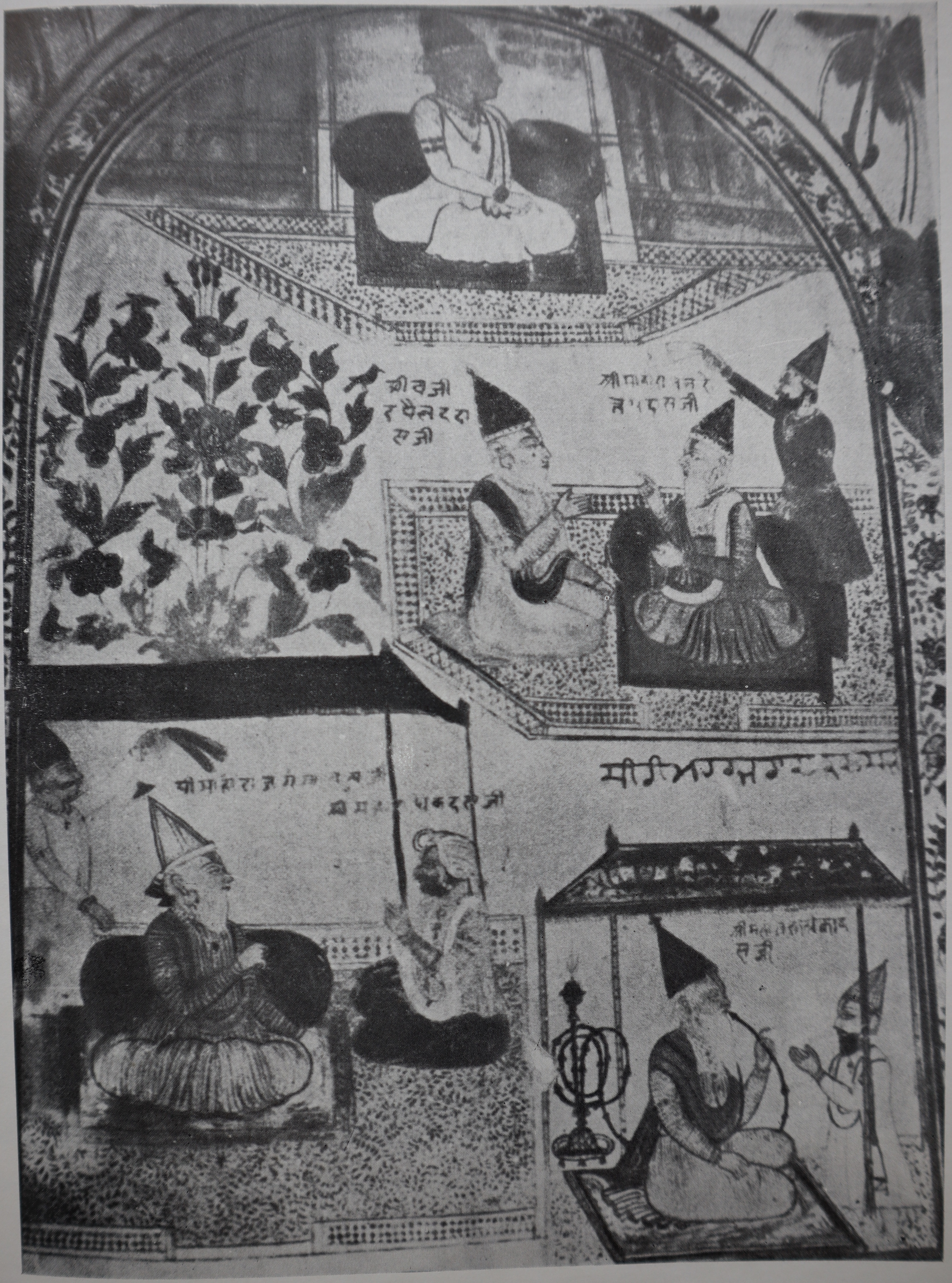
Mural depicting four mahants of Pindori Dham located in Pindori, Gurdaspur district, Punjab

The Vaishnav establishment at Pandori Dham was founded by local Ramanandi saint Shri Bhagwanji who was a Dogra Khajuria Brahmin born at Kahnuwan town in Gurdaspur. As per local tradition, Shri Bhagwanji during his early years had met Ramanandi saint Krishnadas Payahari of Galta Dham in Rajasthan who had brought him into order of Ramanandi Vaishnavism. Payahari had been a disciple of Nabhadas. The shrine is also said to have won the allegiance of Hindu princely states of hills of Jammu & Himachal. The Rajput rulers of princely states especially Nurpur, Jammu, Mankot, Guler, Basohli, Chamba, Bandralta, Jasrota, Jaswan were particularly devoted to the Pandori dham. The second Mahant of Pandori dham, Shri Narainji is said to have survived the ordeal inflicted to him by Muslim Emperor Jahangir who had poisoned him to test his miraculous powers. Shri Narainji survived which left Jahangir feel ashamed and ultimately led him to accept the supremacy of the shrine. The shrine of Pandori also received royal patronage during the reign of Maharaja Ranjit Singh who often journeyed the shrine for happiness.

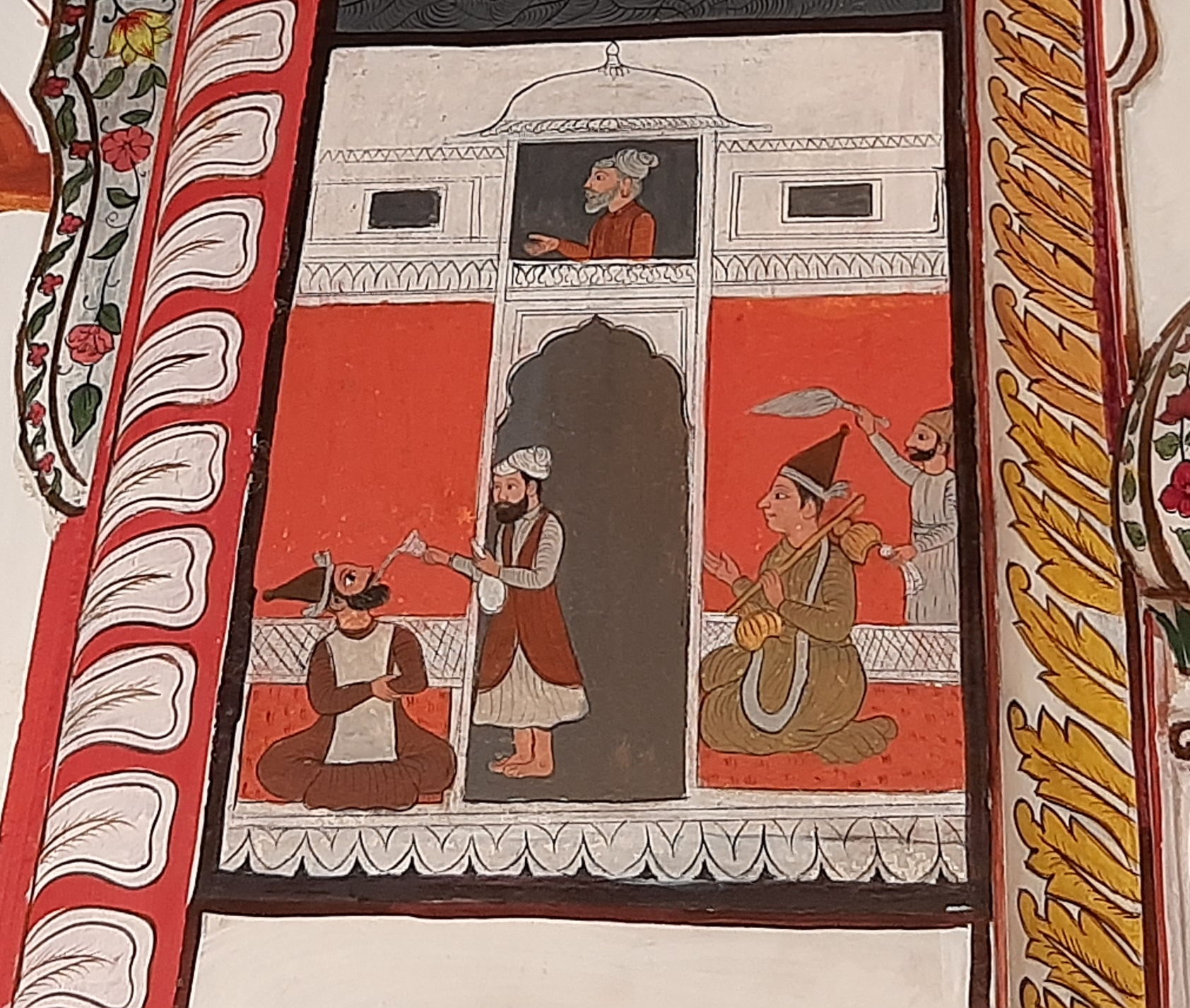
Dogra wall painting on walls of temple at Pandori dham depicts incident when Shri Narainji was poisoned by Emperor Jahangir

== Festivals and cultural events ==
The Baisakhi fair is at Thakurdwara of Bhagwan Narainji at Pandori Mahatan village in Gurdaspur district of Punjab where the fair lasts for three days from 1st Vaisakha to 3rd Vaisakha. The celebrations start in form of procession on morning of 1st Vaisakha, carrying Mahant in a palanquin by Brahmacharis and devotees. After that Navgraha Puja is held and charities in money, grains and cows are done. At evening, Sankirtan is held in which Mahant delivers religious discourses and concludes it by distributing prasad of Patashas (candy drops). Pilgrims also take ritual bathings at sacred tank in the shrine.

== Branches ==
The Thakurdwara at Pandori dham extended its influence not only on neighboring Hindu hill states but also spread its branches in the form of daughter shrines, spreading all over Indian subcontinent, from Jammu in the North, Chinapattan (Chennai) in South India, Girnar (Gujarat) in the West and Ayodhya & Kashi in the east. As per the genealogy published by the Pandori dham itself, there are a total of 39 maths associated with dham which are established all over India. Apart from this, numerous minor branches are established in the towns of North Punjab, Jammu and Himachal.

Some important historical daughter shrines are that of Damtal in Kangra, Bathu in erstwhile Guler state and Lehal in Dhariwal of Gurdaspur. The list of 39 mathas spread across various Indian states and towns are as follow: 7 shrines in Hoshiarpur district (Punjab), 2 in Jalandhar district (Punjab), 1 in Amritsar district (Punjab), 2 in Kangra district (Himachal), 1 in Mandi district (Himachal), 2 in Ambala district (Haryana), 1 in Thanesar (Haryana), 1 in Saharanpur (Uttar Pradesh), 5 in Ayodhya (Uttar Pradesh), 1 in Varanasi (Uttar Pradesh), 1 in Girnar (Gujarat), 1 in Nagpur (Maharashtra), 1 each in Hyderabad, Parshottam & Chinnapattan in South India. There are 2 mathas in Jammu and 3 were there in Lahore.

== Mahants ==
=== List of religious heads ===
List of mahant leaders of Pindori
| No. | Name | Portrait | Tenure | Reference |
|---|---|---|---|---|
| 1 | Bhagwanji (Note: Alternatively spelt as 'Bhagvan'.) | | 1493–1622 | |
| 2 | Narainji (Note: Alternatively spelt as 'Narayan'.) | | 1621–1659 | |
| 3 | Anandghan | | 1659–1676 | |
| 4 | Hari Ram | | 1676–1708 | |
| 5 | Sukh Nidhan | | 1708–1727 | |
| 6 | Ram Das (Note: Not to be confused with the later mahant with the same name.) | | 1727–1761 | |
| 7 | Ram Krishan Das | | 1761–1778 | |
| 8 | Keshav Das | | 1778–1807 | |
| 9 | Narotam Das | | 1807–1843 | |
| 10 | Ganga Das | | 1843–1861 | |
| 11 | Radhika Das | | 1861–1887 | |
| 12 | Brahm Das | | 1887–1908 | |
| 13 | Ram Das (Note: Not to be confused with the earlier mahant with the same name.) | | 1908–1980 | |
| 14 | Gobind Das (Note: Alternatively spelt as 'Govind'.) | | 1980–2004 | |
| 15 | Raghubir Das | | 2004–present | |
