= Monkey Thieves =

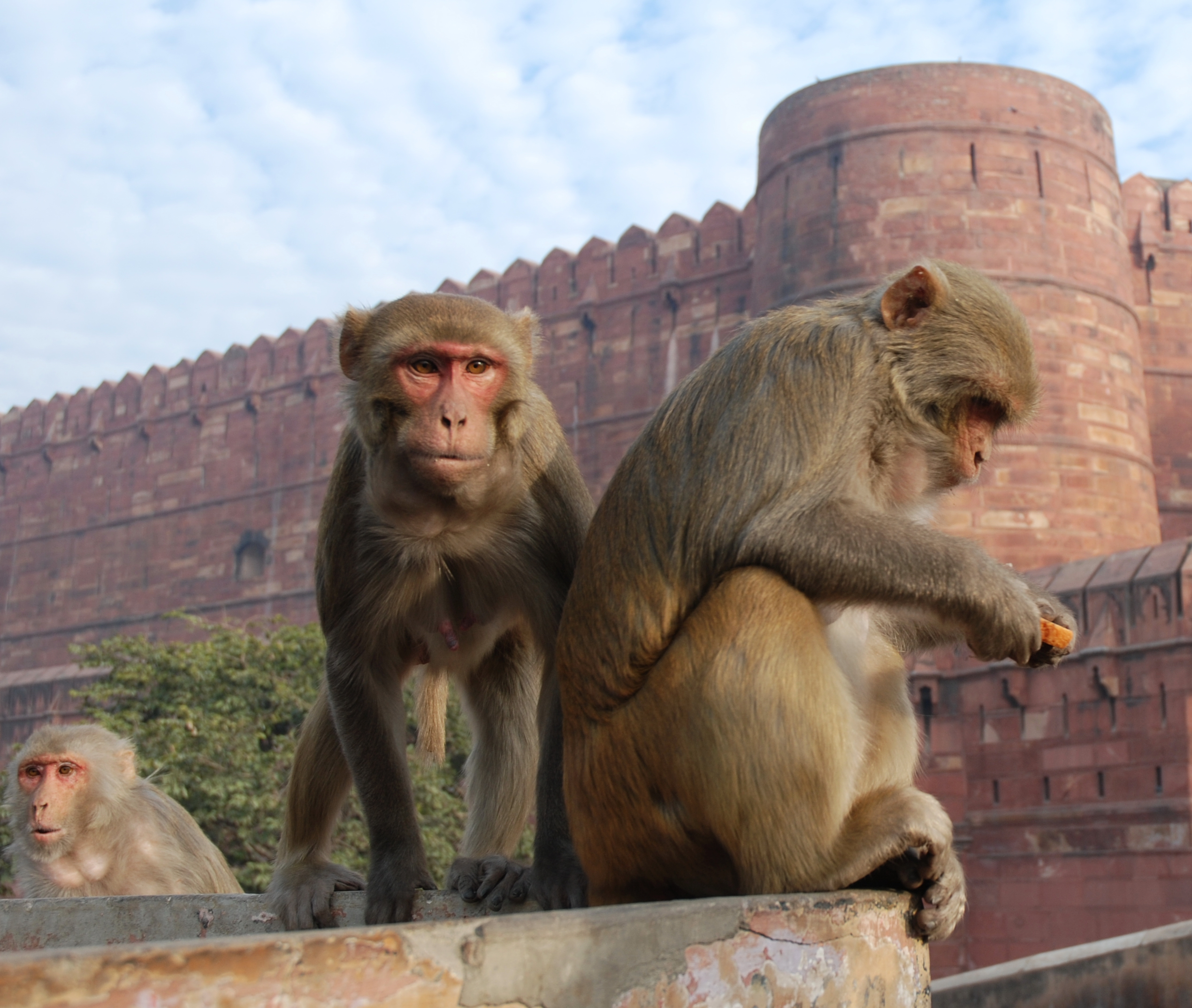
- Rhesus macaques of India
- बंदर चोर

Monkey Thieves (Hindi: बंदर चोर), also known as Rebel Monkeys, is a thirteen-part documentary series produced by National Geographic examining the habits and social interactions of rhesus macaques in the city of Jaipur, located in northwestern India. The show follows the "Galta Gang," a troop of 60 monkeys that live in the Galta Temple, which is a Sanatan Dharm temple on the outskirts of Jaipur. The series helped launch National Geographic's Nat Geo Wild brand and explored leadership within the animal world.
