= Malana, Himachal Pradesh =

Village in India

Malana
- Village
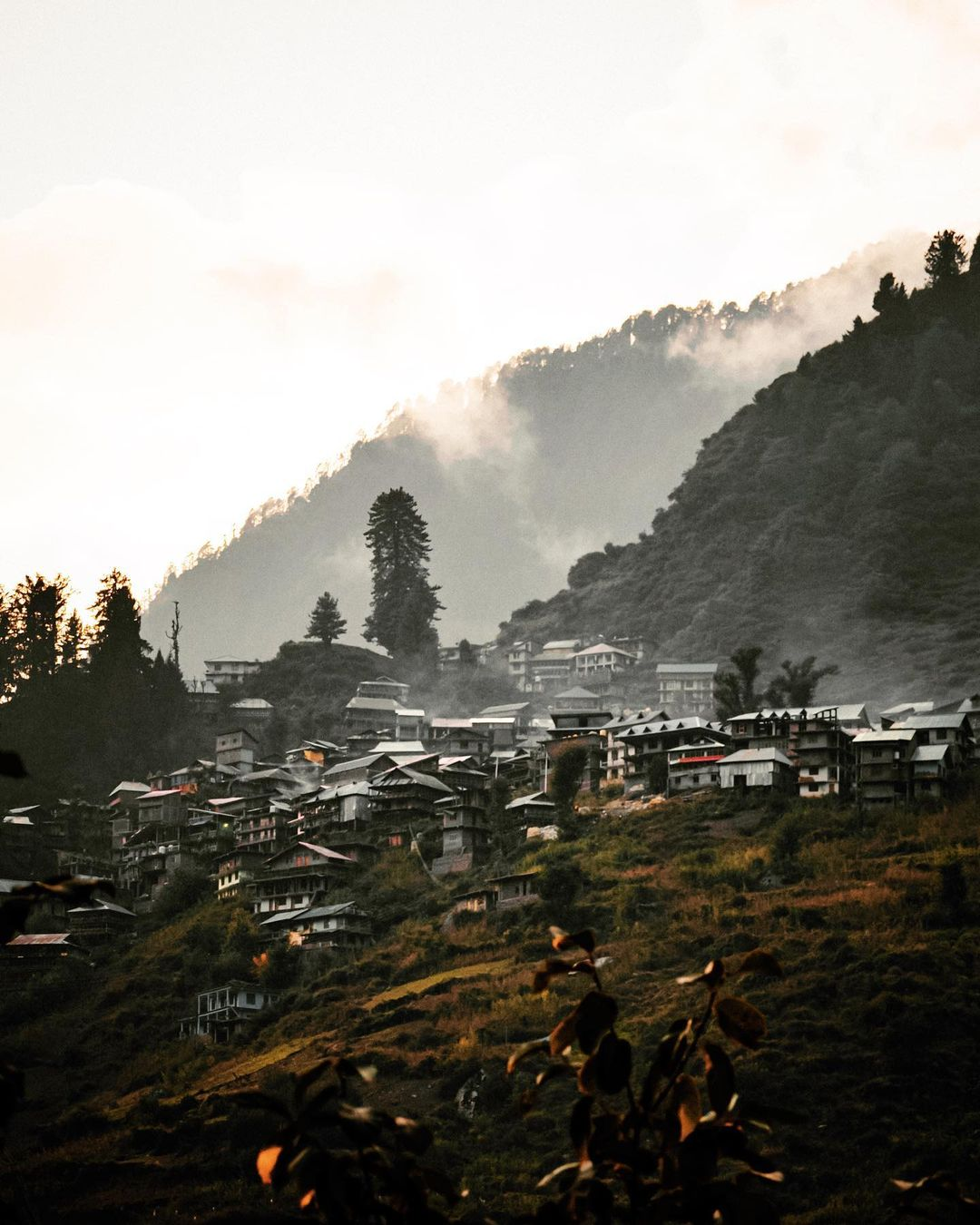

- Location in Himachal Pradesh, India Malana (India)
- Coordinates: 32°03′46″N 77°15′38″E
- Country: India
- State: Himachal Pradesh

Population (July 2017)
  - Total: 4,700
- Demonym(s): Malanese, Malani

Languages
  - Official: Hindi
  - Regional: Kullui
- Time zone: UTC+5:30 (IST)

Malana is an Indian village in the state of Himachal Pradesh. The only village in the Malana Nala, a side valley of the Parvati Valley northeast of the Kullu Valley, it is shadowed by the peaks of Chanderkhani and Deo Tibba. It is situated on a remote plateau by the torrential Malana river, at a height of 2,652 metres (8,701 ft) above sea level. Malana has its own lifestyle and social structure, and people are strict in following their customs. Malana has been the subject of various documentaries, including Malana: Globalization of a Himalayan Village and Malana, A Lost Identity. The existing speakers of the autochthonous language Kanashi, the traditional language of the inhabitants of Malana, number approximately 1700, a roughly threefold increase from 563, gathered from a 1961 census; relatively correspondent to a growth in population. The most common route to the village is by road from Jari.

As per the village's strong custom, outsiders are prohibited from physically touching anything in the village, including its people and temples, a rule punishable with a fine ranging between ₹2,500 and ₹3,500. Villagers are known to bathe after being touched by an outsider. To avoid touching one another, transactions are performed by leaving money on the ground. Villagers strictly keep up with this custom to "preserve the 'purity' of the village".

== History ==
According to local legends, Jamlu rishi (sage) inhabited Malana and created rules and regulations. The locals claim it was one of the oldest democracies of the world, with a well-organized parliamentary system, guided by their devta (deity) Jamlu rishi. Although Jamlu is currently identified with a sage from the Puranas, this is a relatively recent development. Jamlu is believed to have been worshipped in pre-Aryan times. G. M. Young and Penelope Chetwood recount a tale about an orthodox Brahmin priest, who visited Malana, and tried to educate the locals about the pedigree of their god, but had to leave while confessing to not knowing who Jamlu was.

In the folk traditions surrounding Jamlu Devta of Malana, the figure of Jamlu emerges not as a single fixed deity but as a layered cultural presence shaped through the long historical processes of the Western Himalayas, where local belief systems, memory, and religious transformations intersect. Jamlu is locally understood as Jamadagni Rishi, yet this identification does not erase older strata of belief; rather, it reflects a gradual assimilation through which an indigenous deity or territorial guardian becomes interpreted within a broader Brahmanical framework while retaining distinctly local authority, ritual autonomy, and social function. The folklore associated with Jamlu emphasizes sacred law, community order, and divine sovereignty over the village, suggesting a deity whose legitimacy rests not only in mythic genealogy but in lived social practice and customary institutions. At the same time, the narrative layers surrounding Jamlu indicate echoes of wider Himalayan religious exchanges, where elements resonant with pre-Brahmanical traditions, possible affinities with Bon and early Buddhist cosmologies, and later Hindu reinterpretations coexist without fully dissolving into one another. In this sense, Jamlu functions as a cultural bridge, demonstrating how Himalayan societies absorbed and localized larger religious currents moving across regions such as Kullu, Ladakh, Tibet, and beyond, while preserving continuity through oral transmission and ritual performance. The folklore therefore reveals Jamlu not merely as a deity of myth but as a historical node through which questions of identity, sacred geography, political authority, and religious synthesis in the Western Himalayas can be understood.

In folklores deity has myriad names Jamlu, jaimo, jamdagni rishi, jamlu rishi and is associated with Mata Renuka as his consort, in other folklores Raja Ghepan of lahaul, Bonali (Hadimba, Manali) and Jamlu are considered as siblings. There is also a famous saying in the Hampta region ' Jetha Hampta- Kona Malana' which translates to elder one sits in hampta and younger one in malana which means that people of hampta trace their relation with jamlu way back than people of malana owing to a folklore which tells Jamlu carried a basket through hampta which had all deities in it which are now in Kullu Valley before strong winds blew them and they were spread across kullu viz-a-viz 'Tharah Kardu' . This also means that deities of same name and denominations also have hierarchies in kullu valley and multifarious folklores and legends surrounding them.

Malana has been called ‘one of the oldest democracies’ in the world. The villagers believe that they are descendants of the soldiers of Alexander the Great who got stranded here on account of injuries.

A dam project, the Malana Hydro Power Station, has brought Malana much closer to the rest of the world and provides revenue for the region. A new road has shortened the walking time from several days to just 4 hours. On 5 January 2008, a raging fire in the village, which burnt for more than 5 hours, destroyed cultural structures and parts of ancient temples located in the village. In 2017, the village ordered the closure of approximately a dozen guest houses and restaurants, ostensibly on the orders of the deity Jamlu.

== Government ==
Although the village is situated in Himachal Pradesh, India, people of this village do not consider them to be a part of India. They have their own judiciary system as well. The village is governed by a bicameral parliament, consisting of lower house called the Kanishthang and an upper house called the Jayeshthang. The current panchayat is Bhagi Ram.

== Language ==
The residents of Malana speak Kanashi/Raksh, which is understood only by the villagers. Kanashi does not resemble any of the dialects spoken in its neighbourhood but seems to be a mixture of Sanskrit and several Tibetan dialects. It is classified as a Tibetan-Burmese language. Kanashi has no intelligibility with any Tibeto-Burman language of Kinnaur.

== Economy ==
The economy of Malana was traditionally based on making baskets, ropes and slippers from hemp. Marijuana was cultivated as a legal cash crop for centuries. Beginning in the 1980s, Malana became a destination for recreational drug tourism. The village also produces maize and potatoes. While tourism is now a major source of income for the village, tourists can only stay outside of the village in cafes, but not inside the village or in homesteads which was previously allowed.

== Culture and lifestyle ==
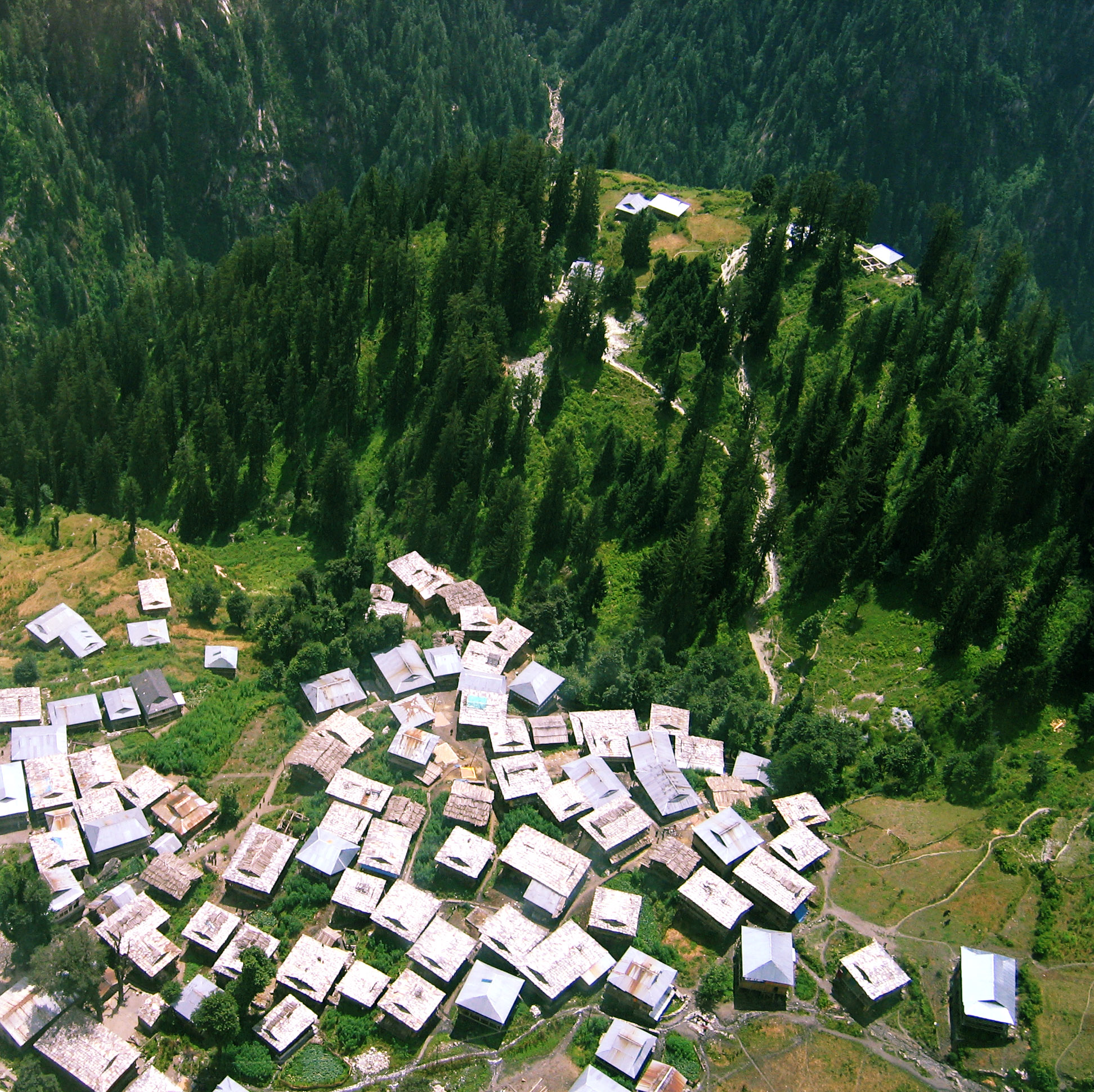
Aerial view of the village

The village administration is democratic and is believed, by locals, to be the oldest republic of the world.

Despite being a part of the Kullu valley, there is a myth that the Malanis have very distinct physical features, and a dialect which is different from the rest of the valley. However, in the valleys of Himachal, there are a significant number of distinct Pahari dialects, some of them totally different from each other. Hence the physical/lingual uniqueness cannot be proven, given the inaccessibility of the Malana people, except for the trade of marijuana and hashish in the Parvati valley.

=== Jamlu Devta ===
The social structure of Malana in fact rests on villagers' unshaken faith in their powerful deity, Jamlu Devta. The entire administration of the village is controlled by him through a village council. The council has eleven members believed to be delegates of Jamlu who govern the village in his name. His decision is ultimate in any dispute and any outsider authority is never required. Thus Malana has been named the Athens of the Himalayas.

Jamlu is invoked through a villager serving as an oracle. The deity Jamlu is also known as Rishi Jamdagni.

==== The tale of the Brahmin priest ====
A tale involving Jamlu and Malana was recounted by the villagers to the English historian G. M. Young when he visited it in 1911. A Brahmin priest (pandit) brought Jamlu's supposed true lineage (said to be Jamadagni) to the village of Malana, written on a piece of parchment. The villagers suggested that he lay it on the temple to see if Jamlu recognizes it, whereupon the spirit of the god supposedly incarnated into a crowd of men (called 'Ra Deo') and started to rave and gibber which bewildered the Brahmin. Nevertheless, he went into the temple with one of the Malana hosts clad in only a loincloth and carrying the parchment. Inside the temple, the Brahmin became paralyzed and speechless and had to be dragged out by his companion. Neither of them would say what happened inside the temple, but the Brahmin supposedly tore up the parchment and left, confessing to not knowing who Jamlu was.

Young believes that the Brahmin in the story (if it was factual) actually succeeded in his goal of incorporating Jamlu into the Hindu pantheon, despite the contempt of it shown by the villagers. Jamlu is sometimes referred to by the alternative name of "Jamdaggan", and his supposed older brother Gaiphan, is also called "Jagamdamb", both are seemingly variants of Jamadagni. Moreover, the youngest son of Jamadagni, Parashurama, exists as a deity in one of the nearby villages and is also acknowledged as a son of Jamlu. While Young still believes that Jamlu and the other local deities of Kullu originate from older indigenous gods, he also noted that over time, they syncretized with Hindu elements and their original names were lost to history.

==== The Akbar-Jamlu legend ====
Another tale involving Jamlu was also told to G.M. Young in 1911, involving the origins of religious images allegedly sent to Malana by Akbar the Great of the Mughal Empire. The images are said to be taken out once a year during the festival of Jamlu in the month of Phaggan, though what the images depict is unknown.

The tale begins with a sadhu visiting Malana on a pilgrimage. And on his departure, he was given a blanket and a small sum of money from Jamlu's treasury, as was customary. The sadhu journeyed onwards to Delhi, whereupon part of the sacred money was taken from him as tax for entrance into the city. This sacrilege supposedly angered Jamlu, and Akbar was stricken with a disease (allegedly leprosy).

Realizing the disease was supernatural in origin, Akbar consulted his mullahs, but they could not help. He then consulted the Brahmins, who told him of the exact cause of his affliction. They told him that the disease would continue until the sacred money that was taken was found and returned to Malana. Akbar asked for the value that was taken, and the Brahmins said that it was only two paisa. Akbar protested that it would be impossible to find such a small amount in his treasury, but the Brahmins nevertheless urged him to try and do so.

Akbar miraculously found the two coins stuck together among the coins in his treasury. The Brahmins instructed him to make a pilgrimage to Malana to return the coins. But being unable to make the long and strenuous journey, Akbar instead sent a golden statue of himself, his horses, and his elephants in his stead. This placated Jamlu, and Akbar's disease was cured.

This story is reenacted in Malana on the 12th of Phaggan. The images were said to be paraded to a grove, where a small stone is embedded on the ground to mark the place where Jamlu waited to receive the emperor's homage.

Young believes the tale is based on some truth, due to the existence of the images. Though whether it really involved Akbar is unlikely, since his role in the story has no special significance attached to it. Young believes that the images and the ritual involving them originate from a much older date.

=== Hellenic connection ===
There are various legends about their origin. According to one of them, it is believed that they are the descendants of Macedonian soldiers of Alexander's army. As the legend goes, some soldiers took refuge in this remote land after Alexander left the country and later settled there permanently. This myth is however disputed without substantial historical evidence and because there are those who claim that it is the valley of Kalash, in Pakistan that is actually the area in which Alexander the Great's soldiers took refuge. This legend is also inconsistent with the legendary descent of the local people from Indo-Aryans who would pre-date Alexander the Great's soldiers by approximately a thousand years. Recent genetic typing of the Malani population is much more consistent with an Indo-Aryan origin with a large proportion of Y-DNA haplotypes J2 and R1a which are the haplotypes of majority of Indians, North or South in South Asia rather than with a Greek origin which would have a different characteristic mix of Y-DNA haplotypes such as R2b. J2 and R1a are paternal lineages found in more than 20% and 40% of population of North/South India but are rare in Mediterranean societies like Greece.

=== Temples ===
The village has several ancient temples, including a Jamlu temple, built in the Kathkuni style, with wooden carving and deer heads, and a Rukmini temple.

=== Malana Cream ===
Malana is famous for its “Malana Cream”, a product made from cannabis plants which grow in the Parvati valley. Malana cream is regarded as high purity hash. In order to make Malana Cream the live cannabis flower is rubbed between the hands repeatedly, pulling out the resin to generate a layer of sticky hashish across the palm.
