= Shri Raghunath Mandir =

Hindu Temple dedicated to Lord Rama in Kullu, Himachal Pradesh, India

- श्री रघुनाथ मँदिर
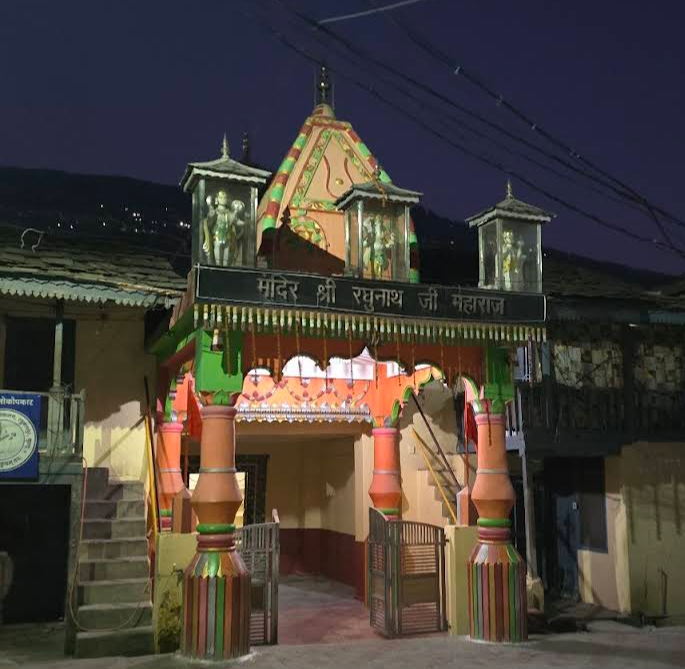
- Shri Raghunath Mandir main entrance

- Location in Himachal Pradesh Shri Raghunath Mandir (India)

Religion
- Affiliation: Hinduism
- District: Kullu
- Deity: Rama
- Festival: Dussehra
- Governing body: Royal Family of Kullu (current Charibardar is Maheshwar Singh)

Location
- Location: Sultanpur, Kullu
- State: Himachal Pradesh
- Country: India
- Coordinates: 31.960993°N 77.113832°E

Architecture
- Style: Pahari and Pyramidal architecture
- Founder: Jagat Singh
- Established: 1660 CE

Specifications
- Elevation: 1,232.22 m (4,043 ft)

Shri Raghunath Mandir is a Hindu temple located in Kullu town in Kullu district of Northern Indian state of Himachal Pradesh. The temple is dedicated to Lord Rama. It is believed to be one of the most sacred temples in all over the world dedicated to Lord Rama.

== History ==
The temple was established in 1660 during the reign of the king Jagat Singh (1637-1672) of Kullu. The reason behind it was the sins that led Jagat Singh to get many problems.

During the reign of Jagat Singh, who was the ruler of Kullu at that time, there was a person named Durgadutt in the village Tippri, who was very famous because of his proficiency in astrology and palmistry. The two officials of the king used to feel spite from him. One day they both made a plan to teach Durgadutt a lesson. They made a false allegation on him, that he has some Suche Moti (natural pearls) in his home without the permission of the king. They told this to the king, and as per their allegations the king ordered to investigate into the matter and then he moved to Manikaran for the pilgrimage. As the king returned, he went directly to Durgadutt's home. Durgadutt told those officials that he will produce the pearls to the king when he will arrive. When the king arrived himself, Durgadutt already burnt himself alive with his wife and son, he came out of his home screaming and while he was burning, he threw a piece of his burning body part and said to the king, that you wanted the pearls, so here they are. The king got very upset about the incident and felt deep guilt, soon he began to see worms in his food and water as blood. After a while he got leprosy. He got very sorrowed and worried about his condition. So he got advised by his Rajguru to meet Sidhhguru Krishnadas Payahari. Sidhhguru told him that he has committed the sin of Brahmahatya and advised him that bringing the idols of Shri Rama (Shri Raghunath), Mata Seeta and Hanuman Ji from Ayodhya's Tretanath Mandir during the time of Ashwamedh Yajna will absolve him from his sins and it would be divine to his kingdom. Jagat Singh listened to his advice but he was thinking that who would take the idols from Ayodhya and who would let them take away the idols from there, so the Guru gave this task to his disciple Damodar Das. Das went to Ayodhya as per the instructions given by his Guru and reside there for an year in Tretanath Mandir and served the priests of the temple and one day he took away the idols, as he was coming way back to Kullu, the Pandits of Ayodhya caught him in Haridwar by following him and forced him to give back the idols. They took the idols but when they tried to pick up the idols, they couldn't and when Damodar Das picked them up he could do it easily. They told him to go with them to Ayodhya with the idols kept with him but as he began to walk towards Ayodhya, he couldn't see and when he was coming to the way back he could see everything. When the Pandits of Ayodhya saw it, they acknowledged that it is the decision of Lord Rama himself to go to Kullu and enthroned there. So eventually they let Damodar Das go freely back to Kullu. After the idols successfully brought to the Kullu, king Jagat Singh worshipped the idols and drank the Charnamrit (holy nector) from the idols feet after washing them. Gradually king's leprosy and illnesses got cured.

District Devi Devta Kardaar Sangh's former Chairperson Detram Thakur said that after this, the king Jagat Singh entrust all his kingdom to Shri Raghunath and became his chief Charibardar.

== Belief ==
The main idol (mul vigraha) is made up of Ashtadhatu, weighs around five hundred grams and about three inches long is installed in the temple is of Shri Rama in the royal form unlike that of Balak Ram in the Ram Mandir in Ayodhya. Shri Raghunath is believed to be the primary deity of the Kullu valley. Nearly five hundred deities are worshipped in the Kullu valley and all the deities are believed to acknowledge Shri Raghunath as the chief deity of Kullu. The idols of Shri Raghunath, Goddess Seeta and Lord Hanuman (also made up of Ashtadhatu) installed in the temple is believed to safeguard the entire Kullu valley from any sort of evil. Currently, former MLA of Kullu, Maheshwar Singh is the Charibardar of the temple.

=== Kullu Dussehra ===
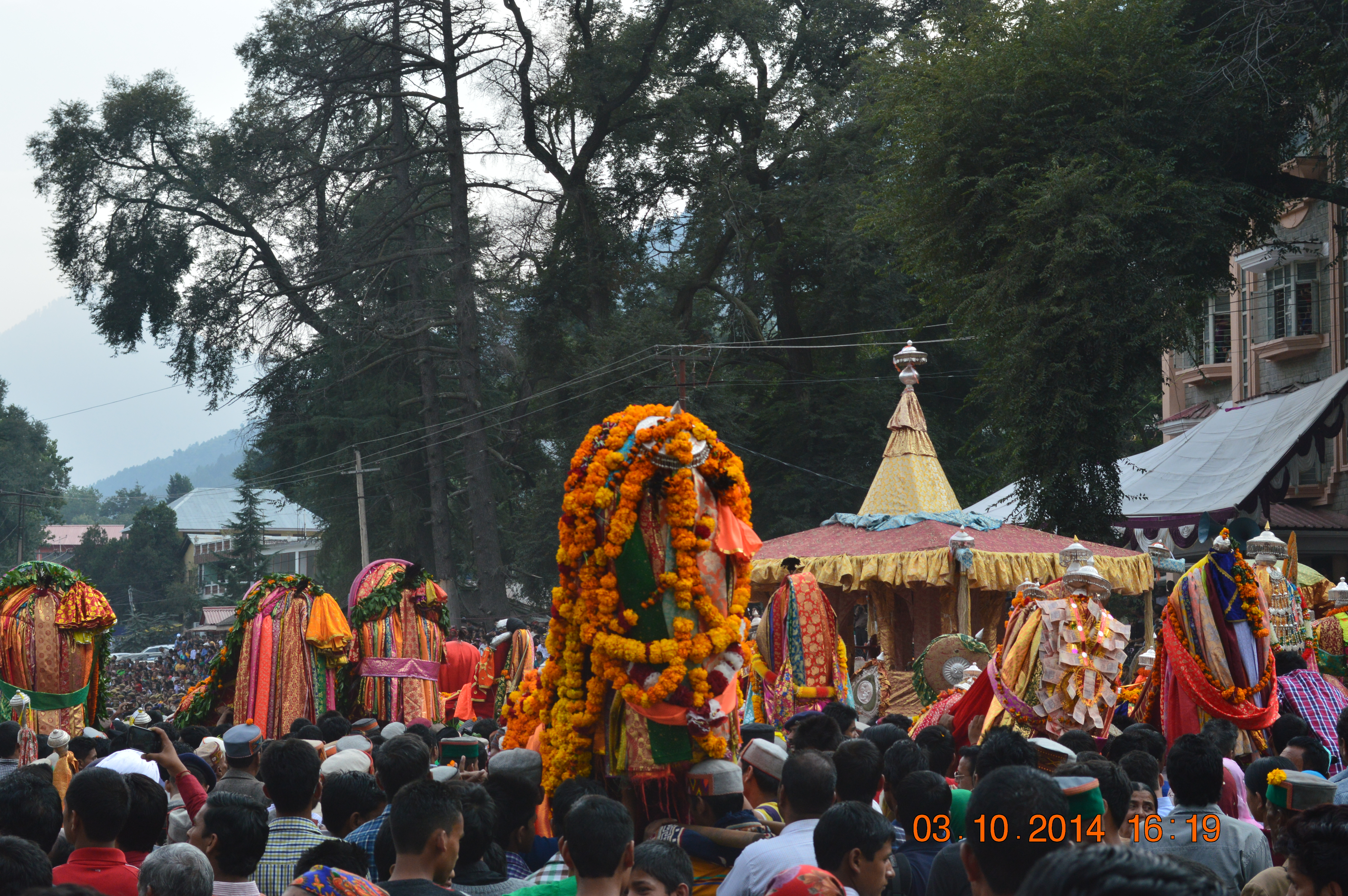
Kullu Dussehra in 2014

Kullu Dussehra also known as the International Mega Dussehra Festival is the main festival that is celebrated in the Kullu valley. The festival is celebrated in the royal manner and with pure faith. The festival attracts more than half a million people each year globally. Kullu Dussehra has the largest public gathering not only in the Mahasu region but in whole of the Himalayan region. The festival is totally different of its kind as in the festival more than three hundred deities of the valley and of the surrounding areas of the region gather to pay their respect to Shri Raghunath, who is believed to be the primary deity of Kullu.

In 2022, Prime Minister Narendra Modi with the then Chief Minister of Himachal Pradesh Jai Ram Thakur and Governor Rajendra Arlekar came in the festival and paid their respect to Raghunathji and other deities of the region and sought their blessings.

== Architecture ==
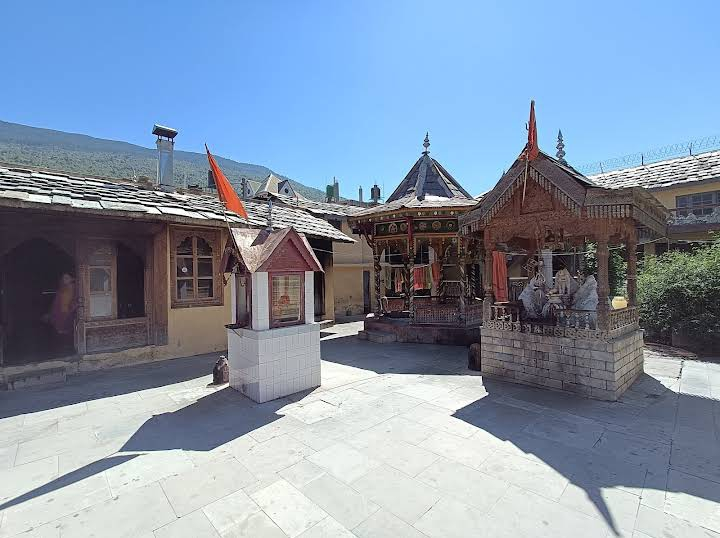
Main premises of the temple

The temple doesn't follow the traditional Western Pahari Himalayan Kath Kuni architecture, which is the primary architectural design of the Mahasu region (as the temple lies in the region) which is shaped by local climate, materials and royal patronage, instead it has the blend of Pahari and Pyramidal styled architecture. As it is the mixed architectural styled, so as in the Kath Kuni (Pahari) architectural style, the temple is made up of stone and woods, the temple also has stones used in the temple which are the local river stones which probably belong to the Beas river, used in the foundation and lower walls of the temple. Deodar Cedar wood is extensively used in the temple especially in the beams, doors, pillars and roof framework. Wood is carved in geometric and Vaishnav motifs. The temple has Garbhagriha (sanctum sanctorum) where the idols of Shri Raghunath is enthroned and Mandapa (assembly hall) where the daily worships and rituals are performed. The temple is built on a slightly raised platform. The temple is not built as a grandeur but as a simple place of worship. Some areas of the temple are restricted for royal family.

== Geography ==
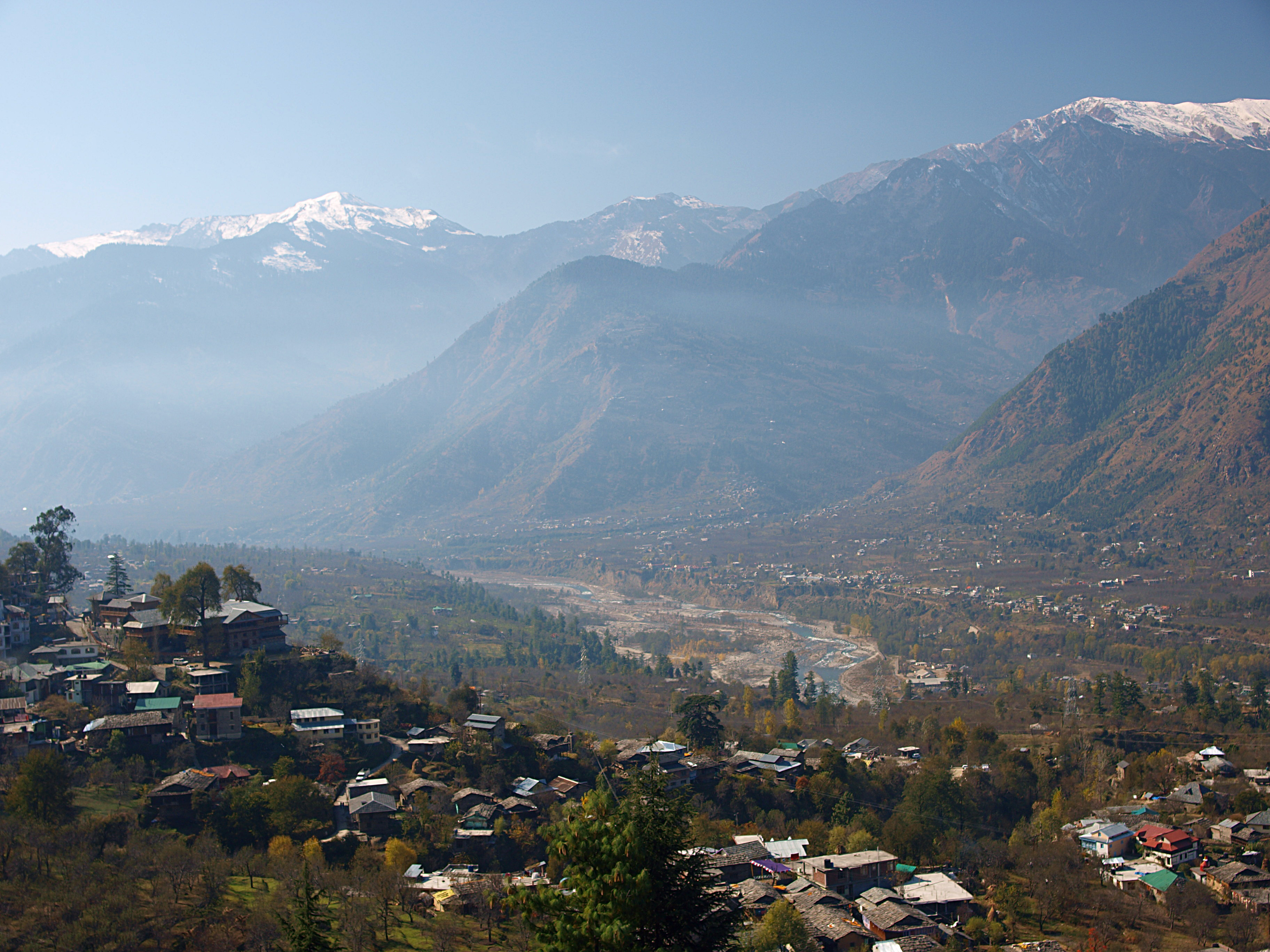
Kullu valley in 2008

Shri Raghunath Mandir is situated in Sultanpur locality in Kullu town. The temple is situated at a small elevated hillock overlooking the Kullu valley. The temple is located near the Beas River which flows through Kullu valley from east to west. Beas river plays an important role in the cultural and religious geography of the area. The area around the temple is surrounded by Deodar, Pine and Fir trees.

== Controversy ==
The temple priests and the state security personnel deployed at the temple on the morning of 8 December 2014, discovered that the idols of Shri Raghunath, along with the idols of Lord Hanuman, Lord Ganesha, Narsangh and Saligram with about 10 kgs of silver and 1 kg of gold ornaments, valued at Rs. 32 Lakhs, were stolen from the temple. The thieves got inside the temple through the roof from the rear and took away the idols, thieves also used rope to reach to the rooftop. A stray dog was also found dead at the rear of the temple. The police suspected that the thieves must have gagged that barking dog to death. Surveillance cameras placed at the site did capture the images of three persons but it was difficult to identify the thieves from the bleak footage. As soon as the news of the theft spread, the local residents gathered outside the temple and also recited Ramcharitmanas to seek divine intervention for catching the thieves. The then Additional Director General of the Himachal Pradesh Police Sanjay Kundu with police officers Surinder Verma, Abhishek Dhullar, and Kushal Sharma recorded and checked over one-thousand phone numbers that were active in the night during the theft took place and also interrogated over five-hundred people and were able to breakthrough the case. The ground investigations clued that the suspects were Nepalis, especially when their phone numbers got inactive after the theft took place. The police then was able to get track of one Nepalese suspect, the circuit camera near the temple also captured that person that he was visiting the temple time and again. As some calls received on the phone of prime suspect were from Nepal, the Himachal Police sought assistance of central agencies to track him to his village. Then Himachal Police asked Nepal Police to detain him. After his interrogation the Himachal Police got to know that where he had hidden the idols. Before this incident in the same year, in January 2014, theft of 43 kg silver that valued around Rs. 23 Lakhs was also happened in the temple. The modus operandi in both the cases were same.

The Himachal Police on 23 January 2015 recovered the stolen idols. The idol of Shri Raghunath was found at Bajaura on the outskirts of Kullu along the Mandi-Kullu National Highway. The idol was hidden under a pile of rocks. The other three idols were found near Vipasha Market in Kullu. The oracles made by other deities of the valley through their Gurs (Shamans) during the investigation, that the much revered idols have never left the Kullu valley and would soon be recovered, and as said eventually when the investigation cracked, the idols were in the valley only, in the outskirts of the town.
