= Bawa Lal Dayal =

14th century Hindu saint

Bawa Lal Dayal Bairagi
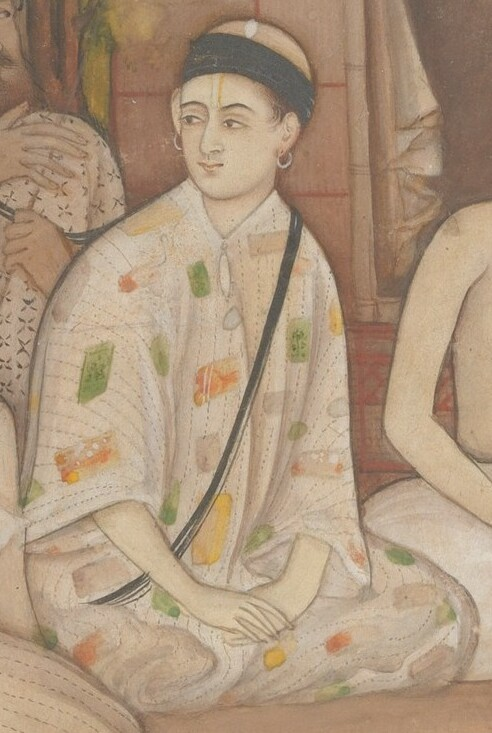
- Detail of Bawa Lal Dayal from a painting of a gathering of holy men of different faiths, by Mir Kalan Khan, c. 1770–75

Personal life
- Born: 15th century Kasur, Delhi Sultanate (Present-day Punjab, Pakistan)
- Died: early 16th century Dhianpur, Delhi Sultanate (Present-day Gurdaspur district, Punjab, India)
- Parents: Bholamal (father); Krishna Devi (mother)
- Known for: Spreading peace and social welfare; Founding of Lal Dwara, Dhianpur
- Other names: Bawa Lal Dayal Ji, Lal Das Bairagi, Lal Jiv, Lal Dayal, Lal Dyal

Religious life
- Religion: Hinduism
- Sect: Ramanandi Sampradaya

Religious career
- Teacher: Krishnadas Payahari
- Based in: Dhianpur
- Disciples: Dhian Das, Gurmukh Lal, Kashi Ram
- Influenced: Dara Shikoh

Bawa Lal Dayal, also known as Lal Das Bairagi, was a 15th-century Indian saint, revered in Hinduism.

== Biography ==
Modern painting of Baba Lal Dayal

Bawa Lal was born in the village of Kasur near Lahore, Punjab. His father was Bohlamal and his mother was Krishna Devi. He left his home at the age of 8 in search of guru Chetan Swami and went to Lahore. From Lahore, he went to Behra, Gujranwala, Sialkot, Riyas, Rajouri, Kashmir, Mansarovar (Kailash Parvat), and then moved towards Badrinath and Kedarnath. Eventually, he returned to Punjab. Upon reaching Lahore, near Shahdra on the bank of the Ravi River, he had a darshan of Chetan Swami.

Bawa Lal is mentioned in famous historical works including Samudra Sangama, Ḥasanāt al-ʼĀrifīn, Majma al-Bahrain, Dabistān-i Madhāhib, and Mathnawi-i Kajkulāh. Bawa Lal used to visit every year Rampur Haler in Hoshiarpur Dist in Punjab for Chaturmasa along with his disciples.On Shukla paksh tenth tithi of Kartik Month vikrami samvat 1712 He left his body here after immersing with eternal soul, uttering the words " योग युक्ति कर राखूँ देह, फिर भी चीज पराई यह". Dhyandas who always accompanied Bawa Lalji also left his body 7 days prior to Bawa Lalji as he could not bear the separation of Bawa Lalji. Their samadhis are present at this place and every year after Deepawali a fair of 10 days is celebrated here in fond memories of Bawa Lalji and Dhyan Das ji during which Ram Katha or Bhagvat katha is listened from saints. Continuous bhandara is given to devotees for 10 days. Shraadh and Havan is done on tritiya, ashtami and dashmi tithis, the brahmleen days of Dhyan Das, Mahant Ram Prakash Das(Mahant of Rampur and Datarpur Gaddi who merged with eternal soul in 2010 AD) and Bawa Lal Ji respectively. This celebration is done only at Rampur Haler. The annual celebrations are being conducted under the guidance of the present Mahant of Rampur and Datarpur Gaddis, Shri Ramesh Das Shastri.

== Shrine and Tradition ==
=== Main Temple: Lal Dwara Dhianpur ===
Shri Dhianpur Dham is the most sacred holy place for pilgrimage among the followers of the Bawa Lal Sampradaya. Dhianpur is a village in Gurdaspur district in the Indian state of Punjab. Located about 20 km (12 mi) from Batala, it is well known for the ashram of Lal Dayal. The 2001 census of India recorded Dhianpur as having a population of 3,095 forming 510 households.

In 1495, Bawa Lal arrived at this place with Dhiandasji, Gurumukh Lal and Kashi Ram and was so impressed with the beautiful and calm atmosphere that he gave it the name Dhianpur after the name of his disciple Dhiandas. The temple complex is situated on a hillock and according to believers contains the sacred Samadhi of Bawa Lal and Gurumukh Lal, his first successor, as well as Vyas Gaddi and Ram Mandir.

Shri Dhianpur Dham is visited by hundreds of thousands of people from around the world. The city of Ludhiana also has a temple of Lal Dyal situated at New Shivaji Nagar since 1970.

Bawa Lal used to visit every year Rampur Haler in Hoshiarpur Dist in Punjab for Chaturmasa along with his disciples.On Shukla paksh tenth tithi of Kartik Month vikrami samvat 1712 He left his body here after immersing with eternal soul, uttering the words "योग युक्ति कर राखूँ देह, फिर भी चीज पराई यह". Dhyandas who always accompanied Bawa Lalji also left his body 7 days prior to Bawa Lalji as he could not bear the separation of Bawa Lalji. Their samadhis are present at this place and every year after Deepawali a fair of 10 days is celebrated here in fond memories of Bawa Lalji and Dhyan Das ji during which Ram Katha or Bhagvat katha is listened from saints. Continuous bhandara is given to devotees for 10 days. Shraadh and Havan is done on tritiya, ashtami and dashmi tithis, the brahmleen days of Dhyan Das, Mahant Ram Prakash Das (Mahant of Rampur and Datarpur Gaddi who merged with eternal soul in 2010 AD) and Bawa Lal Ji respectively. This celebration is done only at Rampur Haler. The annual celebrations are being conducted under the guidance of the present Mahant of Rampur and Datarpur Gaddis, Shri Ramesh Das Shastri.

== Meeting with Prince Dara Shikoh ==
The Prince Dara Shikoh, elder son of Mughal emperor Shah Jahan, was depressed and did not have the courage to face his father, due to his defeat in a battle at Khandhar in 1653. He started residing in Lahore. Seeing his depressed state, Chandra Bhan Brahman, Jahan's mir-munshi, advised Dara to meet Bawa Lal. On hearing his praise, Dara was influenced and wanted to have a darshan of Bawa Lal.

From 1652 to 1653 in Lahore, he claimed to have held a series of interviews with Bawa Lal, and discussed with him the life of the ascetics, the relationship between a guru and their devotees, the circles of life and death, idol worship, the path of spiritual salvation, and various other topics.

Dara held Bawa Lal in the highest regard as evidenced by the introduction and praise in his writing. He introduces Bawa Lal with the following words in his Ḥasanāt al-ʼĀrifīn: "Lāl Mundiyya, who is amongst the perfect Gnostics – I have seen none among the Hindus who have reached such ʼirfān and spiritual strength as he has." He also quotes three aphorisms that he claims to have heard directly from Bawa Lal:

- In the first, Bawa Lal is quoted as having said "Do not become a shaykh, or a walī, or a miracle worker; rather, become a sincere faqīr (faqīr-i bīsākhtagī)."
- In the second aphorism, Bawa Lal tells Dara that "in every community, there is a perfect Gnostic, so that God shall grant salvation to that particular community through him. Therefore, you should not condemn any community."
- In the third and last aphorism, Bawa Lal, on the authority of Kabīr, describes four types of guide: "The first type is like gold, for they cannot make others similar to themselves; the second type is like an elixir – whoever reaches them becomes gold, but they cannot transform others; the third type is like the sandalwood tree, which has the ability to create another sandalwood tree if that tree is prepared for it, but not otherwise; the fourth type is like a lamp, and he is the one known as the 'perfect guide', indeed from one lamp a hundred thousand lamps are illuminated".

== Successors ==
Shri Gurumukh Lal, disciple of Bawa Lal, was the second Acharya of the Shri Dhianpur Dham and on November 1, 2001, Ram Sundar Das was enthroned as the Acharya of Shri Dhianpur Dham who is the 15th Vaishnavacharya of Shri Dhianpur Dham and the present divine successor of Bawa Lal.
