= Chanderkhani =

Mountain pass in Himachal Pradesh, India

Chanderkhani Pass चंद्रखनी दर्रा
- Mountain Pass
- Location within Himachal Pradesh Location within India
- Coordinates: 31.959987°N 77.24°E
- Country: India
- State: Himachal Pradesh
- District: Kullu
- Elevation: 3,660 m (12,010 ft)

Languages
  - Official: Hindi
  - Regional: Kulvi

Chanderkhani Pass (Hindi: चंद्रखनी दर्रा) is a pass located in the Kullu District of India at a height of 3,660 metres. It forms a way (pass) between the villages of Rumsu and Pulag to the well known village of Malana, which indirectly forms a trekking route from Naggar to Malana across the Chanderkhani Pass.

The pass has a lot of religious importance as it was once the seat of meditation for the Saptarishi Jamadagni. A legend has it that there was once a local deity named Jamlu of Malana, and he had in his hand a basket of the local gods, once he was on the top of the pass, he opened the basket and incidentally a strong wind came by and blew away all the idols to the nearby peaks, which is why all the nearby mountain peaks of Indrasan, Deo Tibba, Pir Panjal Range & Parbati Range are considered holy and can be seen very clearly from the pass.

== How To Reach ==
=== Air ===
The nearest airport Bhuntar Airport (IATA code KUU) is at Bhuntar town, situated on NH3 about 32.3 km (20.1 mi) south west of Kasol and 10 km (6.2 mi) south of Kullu town. The airport is also known as Kullu-Manali airport and has more than a kilometre long runway. Air India and some private airlines have regular flights to the airport. Recently Himalayan Bulls in collaboration with Deccan Charters have started flights on Kullu-Chandigarh-Kullu sector thrice a day. Daily flight service (except Tuesday) has been started by 15 May 2013 at Bhunter airport by Air India from Delhi to Bhuntar and vice versa. Chandigarh Airport is the nearest international airport.

=== Road ===
Naggar is equidistant from Manali as well as Kullu and can be reached from Delhi by national highway NH 1 up to Ambala and from there NH 22 to Chandigarh and from there by national highway NH21 that passes through Bilaspur, Sundernagar, Mandi and Kullu towns. The road distance from Chandigarh to Manali is 316 km (196 mi), and the total distance from Delhi to Manali is 566 km (352 mi).

=== Rail ===
Manali is not easily approachable by rail. The nearest broad gauge railheads are at Chandigarh (275 km (171 mi)), Pathankot (325 km (202 mi)) and Kalka (310 km (193 mi)). The nearest narrow gauge railhead is at Joginder Nagar (135 kilometres (84 mi)).

See Bhanupli–Leh line for the proposed railway line through this area.
