= Kilhadev =

16th-century Hindu religious leader

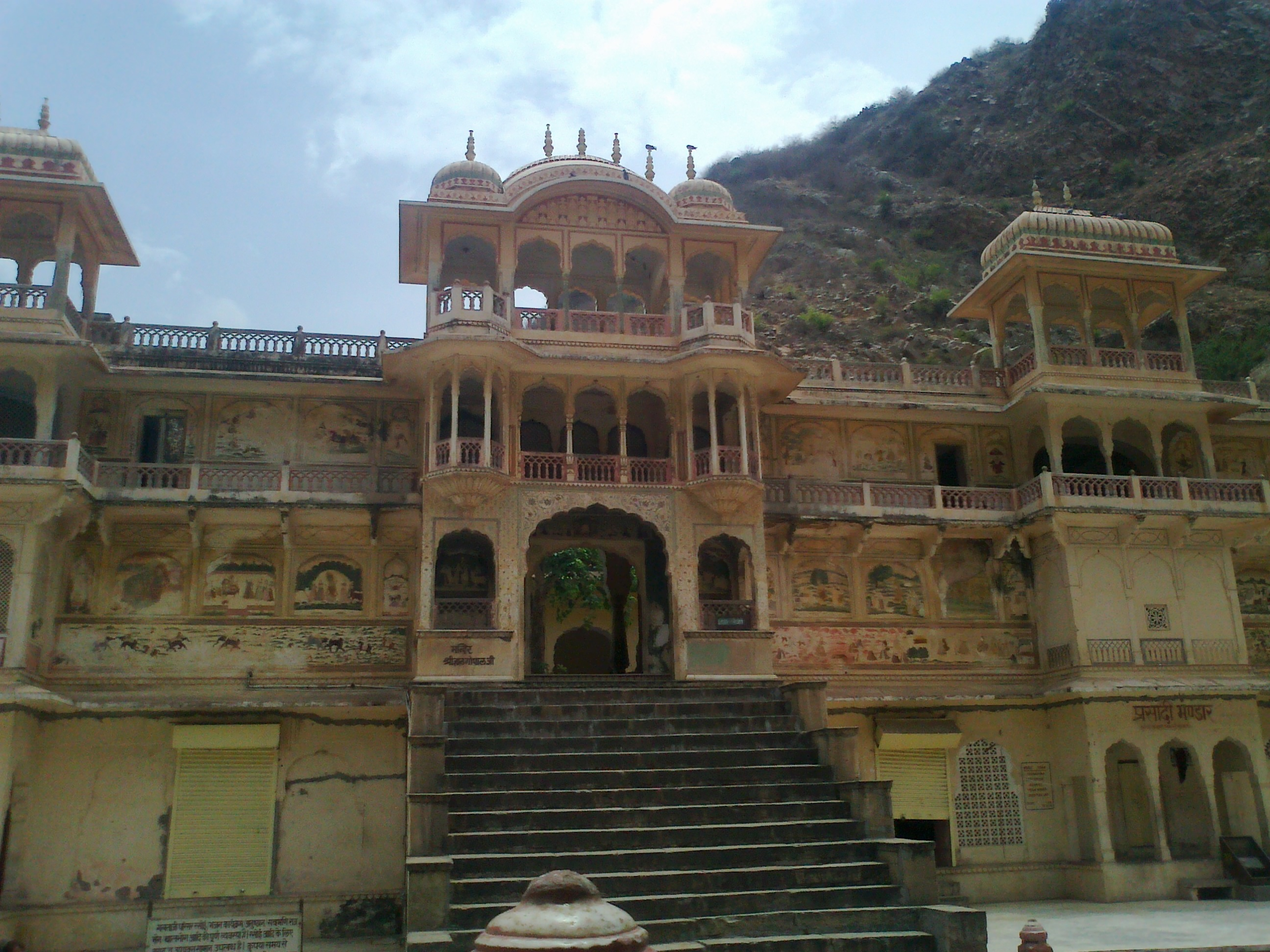
Galtaji temple, Jaipur

Kilhadevacharya or Kilhadevji was the second Mahant of Gaddi of Galtaji, Jaipur, one of thirty-six dwaras of Ramanandi Sampradaya (Bairagis). He succeeded gaddi after his guru Krishnadas Payahari. He was the Guru of Raja Askaran, ruler of Amber(Jaipur) and Narwar. And Diksha Guru of Rupsi Bairagi, son of Prithvi Singh, ruler of Amber (Jaipur) and uncle of Askaran.

He had good knowledge of Samkhya Darshan and Yoga. He emphasized on Yoga Abhyāsa (Yoga Practice) along with Ram Bhakti (devotion to Bhagwan Ram). Thus assimilating the yoga practice into his devotional tradition, he propounded the Tapasi tradition of Ramanandi sampradaya. He is also credited with authoring Adhyāsadhvaṃsaleśa one of the spiritual Ramanandi text.
