= Kala Afgana =

Kala Afghana
- Village
- Location within Punjab Location within India
- Coordinates: 31.886°N 75.044°E
- Country: India
- State: Punjab
- District: Gurdaspur
- Tehsil: Batala
- Region: Majha

Government
  - Type: Panchayat raj
  - Body: Gram panchayat

Area
  - Total: 929 ha (2,300 acres)

Population (2011)
  - Total: 4,944; 2,589/2,355 ♂/♀
  - Scheduled Castes: 377; 194/183 ♂/♀
  - Total Households: 979

Languages
  - Official: Punjabi
- Time zone: UTC+5:30 (IST)
- Telephone: 01871
- ISO 3166 code: IN-PB
- Vehicle registration: PB-18
- Website: gurdaspur.nic.in

Kala Afghana is a village in Batala tehsil located in Gurdaspur district of Punjab State, India. It is 15 kilometres (9.3 mi) from sub district headquarter which is Batala and 55 kilometres (34 mi) from district headquarter and 12 kilometres (7.5 mi) from Sri Hargobindpur. The village is administrated by a Sarpanch, an elected representative of the village. The village is about 5 km from Dhianpur and about 10 km from Fatehgarh Churian.

== History ==
Before 1947, the village is said to have large number of Muslims in it. A mosque is still standing in the village. The village also became a center of the communists in the area.

== Demography ==
As of 2011, the village has 979 houses and a population of 4944, of which 2589 are males and 2355 are females. According to the report published by Census India in 2011, out of the total population of the village 377 people are from Schedule Caste and the village does not have any Schedule Tribe population so far. The village has a significant Christian population.

== Education ==
Notable educational institutions in Kala Afghana include:-

- Government Guru Nanak College
- Government High School, Kala Afgana

== See also ==
- List of villages in India
