= Ramkot, Jammu and Kashmir =

Ramkot Ramkote
- Tehsil and Village
- Location in Jammu and Kashmir, India Ramkot (India)
- Coordinates: 32.640°N 75.332°E
- Country: India
- Union Territory: Jammu and Kashmir
- District: Kathua
- Tehsil: Ramkot

Population (2011)
  - Total: 2,734

Languages
  - Spoken: Dogri, Hindi
- Time zone: UTC+5:30 (IST)
- PIN: 184205

Ramkot, formerly known as Mankot, is a village and tehsil in Kathua district of the Indian union territory of Jammu and Kashmir. The village is located about 60 kilometres from the district headquarter kathua.

Ramkot was earlier known as Mankot after Raja Manak Dev who built a fort over there, Mankot Fort.

== History ==
Mankot – ruled by the Mankotia clan (Rajput Clan of Dogra Dynasty), was the smallest principality of the Duggar Circle which was located between Jammu & Basohli. Mahipat Dev was the well known chief of Mankot who married his daughter to Raja Kripal of Basohli.

Mankot meaning Manak's fort, was an important centre of Dogra miniature paintings.

Mankot was also the subject of a painting, "The Presentation to Akbar of the Keys of Mankot Fort," depicting the surrender of the fort to Emperor Akbar. An 18th century Pahari painting of a "Nayika at her Toilette", from Mankot (Ramkot) are also available at online platforms. Currently that 300 year old painting is at Metropolitan Museum of Art, NewYork, USA.

The exact date/year of origin of Mankot style of painting or 'Mankot Kalam' is not known. But as per records known till now, it was originated & popularized in mid 17th century (possibly between 1650-1660 A.D) during the rule of Raja Mahipat Dev.

In 1848 Raja Ran Singh, ruler of Jaswan kingdom endured imprisonment with an iron mould around his neck in British India until Maharaja Gulab Singh intervened, securing his release and marriage to his granddaughter with jagir of Mankot (now Ramkot) consisting of 22 villages as dowry gift. And after that Mankot, which was founded in late 8th century, was renamed as Ramkot after Raja Ram Singh (younger son of Dogra Maharaja Ranbir Singh)

In 1877, Ran Singh’s British India estates were restored in Jaswan, Rajpura, and Amb. He died in 1892, succeeded by his son, Raja Raghunath Singh, who ruled until 1918. Raja Lakshman Singh then ruled Ramkot from 1918 to 1945, dying on June 4, 1945, and was cremated at Khoon. His son, Raja Chain Singh, held the throne from 1945 to 1947.

== Demographics ==
According to the 2011 census of India, Ramkot has 534 households. The literacy rate of Ramkote was 73.08% compared to 67.16% of Jammu and Kashmir. Male literacy stands at 79.55% while the female literacy rate was 65.99%.

Demographics (2011 Census)
	Total	Male	Female
Population	2724	1441	1283
Children aged below 6 years	350	199	151
Scheduled caste	664	352	312
Scheduled tribe	285	156	129
Literacy	73.08%	79.55%	65.99%
Workers (all)	769	663	106
Main workers (all)	700	–	–
Marginal workers (total)	69	60	9

== Transport ==
=== Road ===
Ramkot is connected by road to other places in Jammu and Kashmir by the Challa-Dayalachak Road and NH 44.

=== Rail ===
The nearest railway station is Chak Dayala, located at a distance of 28 kilometres. The nearest major railway stations are Jammu Tawi railway station and Kathua railway station located at a distance of 83 kilometres and 55 kilometres respectively.

=== Air ===
The nearest airport to Ramkot is Jammu Airport located at a distance of 80 kilometres.

== See also ==
- Mankotia
- Jammu and Kashmir
- Kathua district
- Kathua
