= Galtaji =

Temple complex in Rajasthan, India

Coordinates: 26.8761°N 76.1242°E

- Hindu pilgrimage site
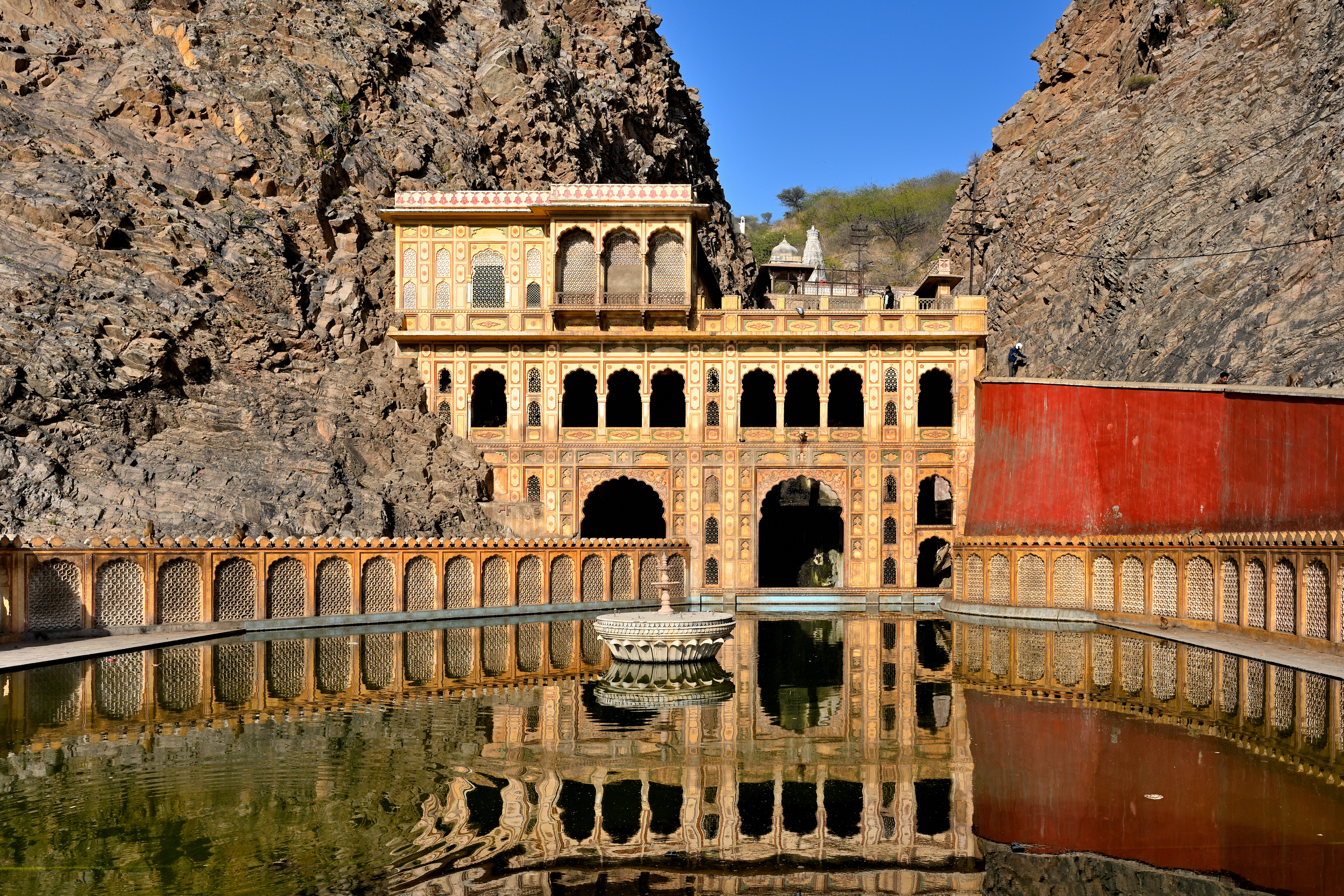
- Zanana Kund and Galta Ji temple
- Nickname: Galwar Bagh
- Interactive map of Galtaji
- Country: India
- State: Rajasthan
- Time zone: UTC+5:30 (IST)

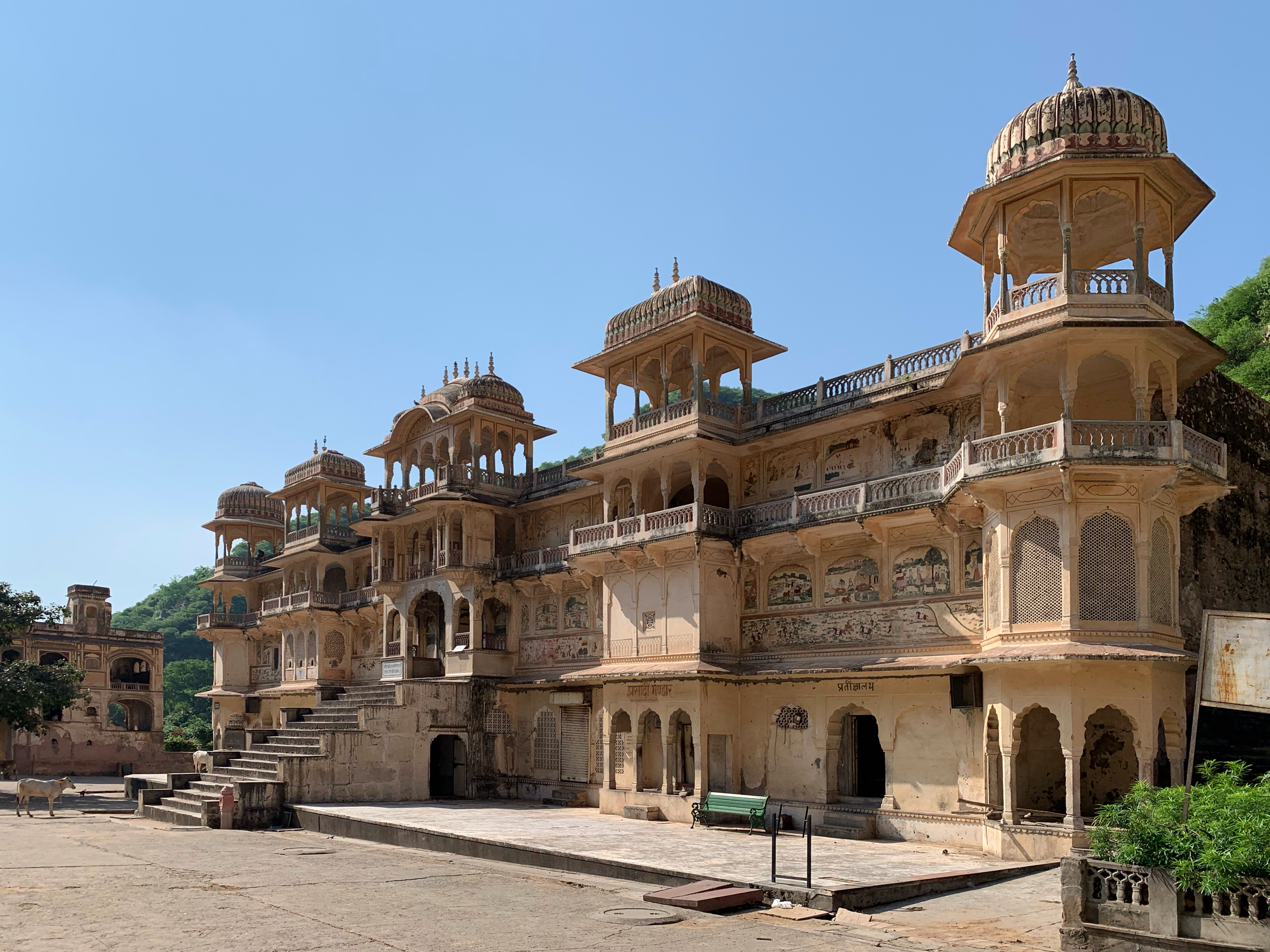
Shri Gyan Gopal Ji Temple in the Galtaji

Galtaji is an ancient Hindu pilgrimage site located approximately 10 km east of Jaipur, in the Indian state of Rajasthan. The site consists of a series of temples built into a narrow crevice in the ring of hills surrounding Jaipur. A natural spring emerges high on the hill and flows downward, filling a series of sacred kunds (water tanks) in which pilgrims bathe. Visitors can ascend the crevasse, continuing past the highest water pool to a hilltop temple, where panoramic views of Jaipur and its fortifications can be seen. It is believed that a saint named Galav lived here, practiced meditation, and performed penance (tapasya).

== Geographical and historical context ==
Galtaji is situated in the Aravalli Hills, about 10 km east of Jaipur, Rajasthan. The site is an important pilgrimage destination, not only due to its spiritual significance but also because of its historical and cultural relevance. Over the centuries, the temple complex has become a hub for asceticism and spiritual practices, particularly for followers of the Vaishnava Ramananda sect.

== Shri Galta Peeth ==
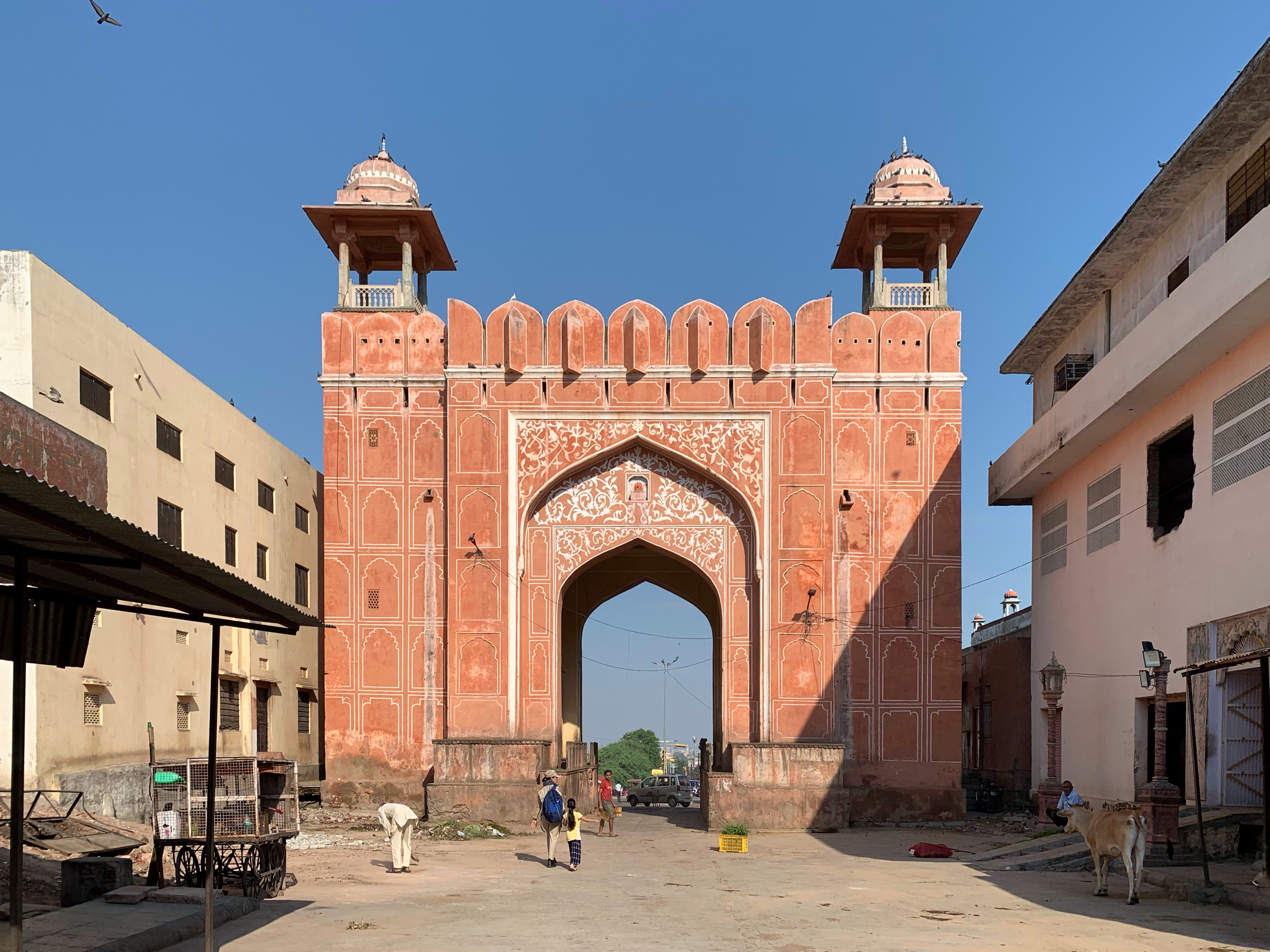
Galtaji Gate

The Galtaji temple is set within a mountain pass in the Aravalli Hills. Since the early 15th century, it has been a retreat for Hindu ascetics belonging to the Ramananda Sampradaya of Shri Ramanand. It is said that the site was occupied by yogis for a long period, and Payohari Krishnadas, a Ramanandi saint, arrived at Galtaji in the early 15th century and became head of the Galta gaddi, replacing earlier yogis.

Galta was northern India's first Vaishnava Ramanandi Peeth and became an important center of the Ramanandi sect. The fame of Ramanandi saint Shri Krishnadas Payahari of Galta dham spread widely, and he initiated Shri Bhagwanji from Punjab into the order of Ramanandi Vaishnavism. Shri Bhagwanji later founded the Ramanandi center at Pandori Dham in Gurdaspur, Punjab.

The temple also houses the shrine of Goswami Nabha Das Ji, a respected Ramanandi saint who met the famous Tulsidas, author of the Ramcharitmanas, at Galta Dham.

== Architectural features ==
The temple complex features a blend of traditional Rajasthani and Mughal architectural styles, with pavilions topped with rounded roofs, intricately carved stone pillars, and colorful frescoes. The temples are built around a natural spring and the sacred kunds (water tanks). The temple complex is built from pink sandstone and is noted for its distinctive architecture which has been described as resembling a palace rather than a traditional temple. These architectural elements integrate seamlessly into the natural landscape, enhancing the spiritual and aesthetic experience of visitors.

== Monkeys and wildlife ==
The temple complex is colloquially known as Galwar Bagh due to the large population of rhesus macaques living in the area. These monkeys have become a significant part of the temple’s ecosystem and are often seen around the temples. Their presence has been featured in National Geographic's "Rebel Monkeys" series and the "Thar Desert - Sacred Sand" episode of Wildest India.

== The Sun Temple ==
Atop the hill is the Sun Temple (Surya Mandir), dedicated to the Sun God. Built by Diwan Rao Kriparam, an attendant at the court of Maharaja Sawai Jai Singh II, this temple offers sweeping views of Jaipur and the surrounding landscape.

== Water tanks ==
The temple complex is renowned for its natural springs, which feed into seven sacred kunds. The most famous is the Galta Kund, which never runs dry and is believed to possess purifying properties. Pilgrims flock here to bathe in the holy waters, especially during Makar Sankranti, when thousands visit to cleanse themselves spiritually.
