= Dhianpur =

- village
- Location in Punjab, India Dhianpur (India)
- Coordinates: 31.92°N 75.07°E
- Country: India
- State: Punjab
- District: Gurdaspur
- Founder: Bawa Lal Dayal Bairagi

Languages
  - Official: Punjabi
- Time zone: UTC+5:30 (IST)
- PIN: 143605
- Telephone code: 01871
- Vehicle registration: pb-17

Dhianpur is a village in Gurdaspur district in the Indian state of Punjab. Located about 20 km from Batala city, it is also known for the ashram of Baba Lal Dayal, a fourteenth century Hindu religious saint of the Punjab.

== Demography ==
The 2011 census of India recorded Dhianpur as having a population of 3,564 forming 673 households. The male residents were 1,880 and the female residents were 1,684 in number. The children below the age of 6 numbered 451, of which 231 were males and 220 were females. The number of scheduled caste population was 528, of which 258 were females and 270 were males.

According to the 2011 census, the number of people in Dhianpur who were literate was 2,349, of which 1,038 were females and 1,311 were males. The illiterate population was 1,215, of which 546 were females and 569 were males.

== Education ==
The list of major educational institutions in Dhianpur is given below.

- Government Senior Secondary School Dhianpur
- Shri Baba Lal Public School

== Notable places ==
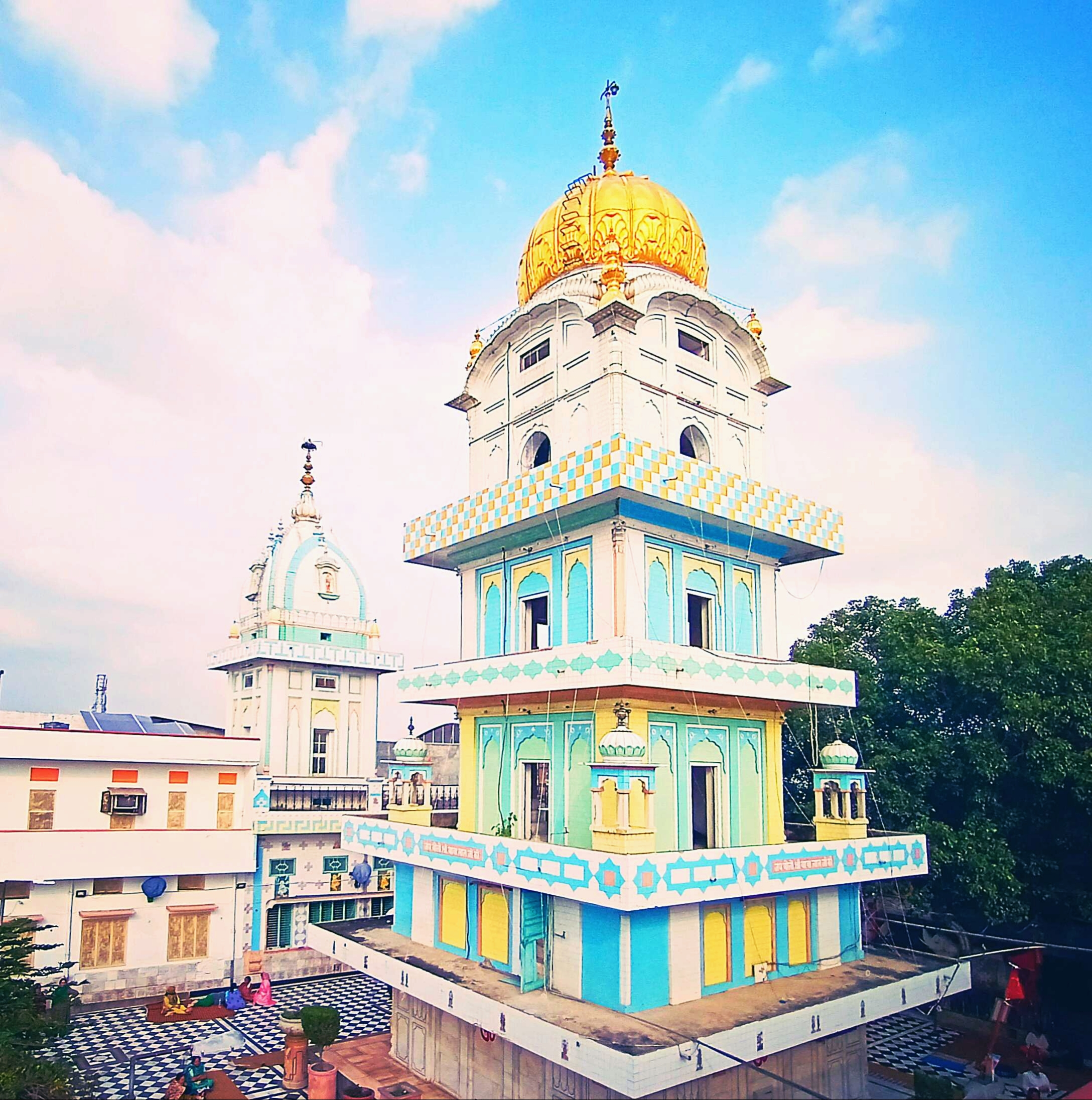
SHRI BABA LAL JI ASHRAM
