= Kullu =

Town in Himachel Pradesh, India

Kullu Kulu
- Town
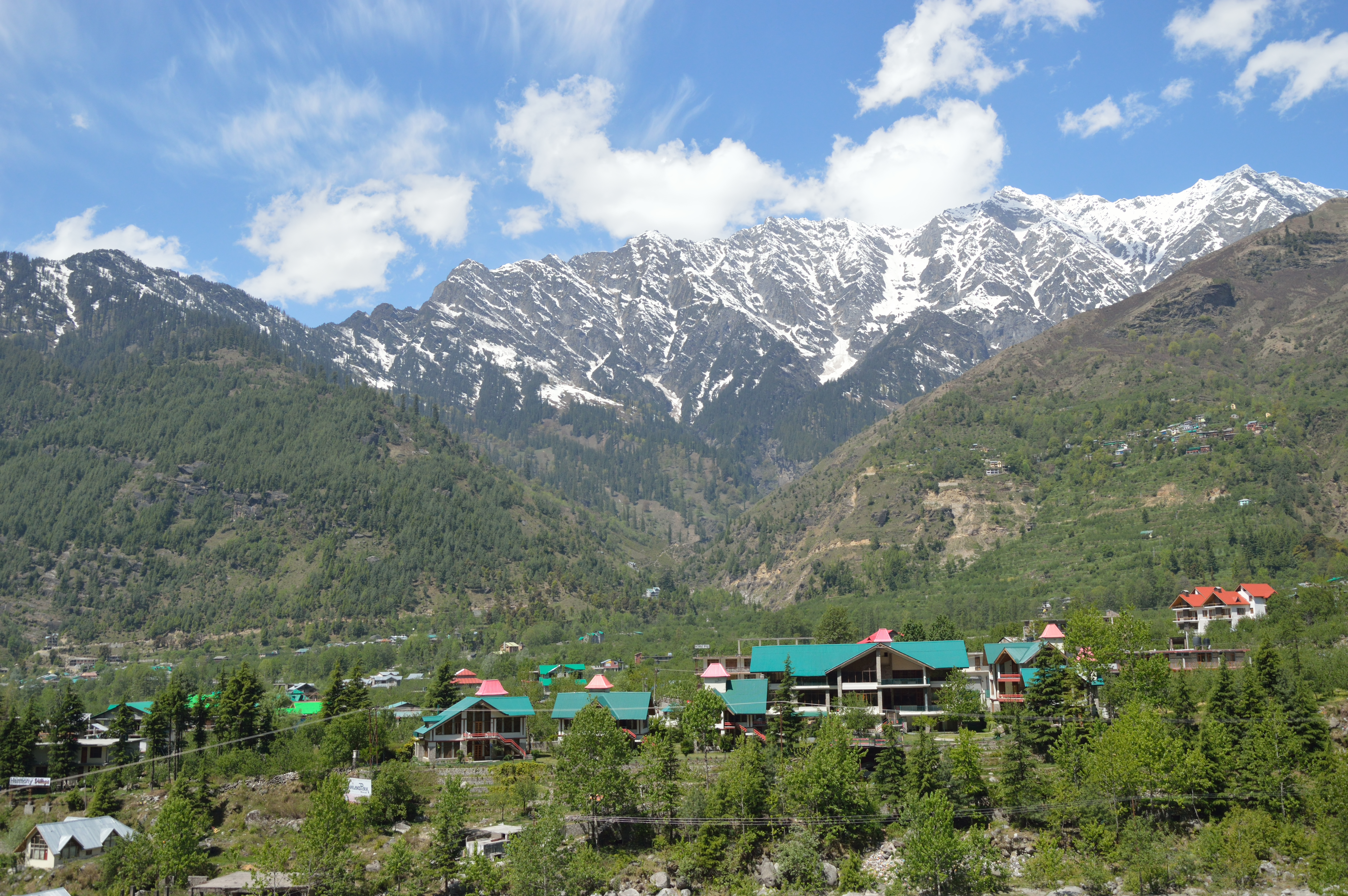
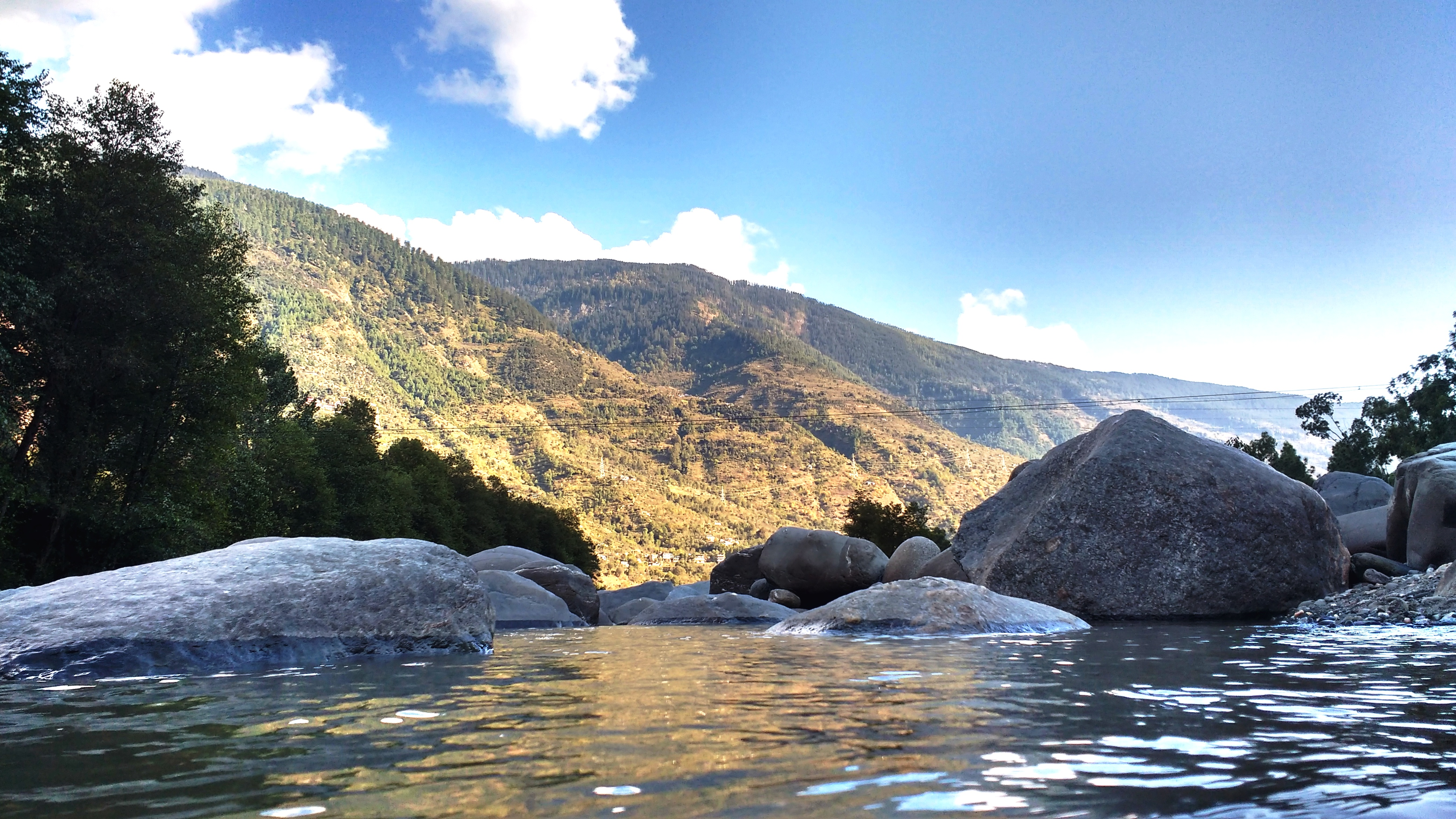
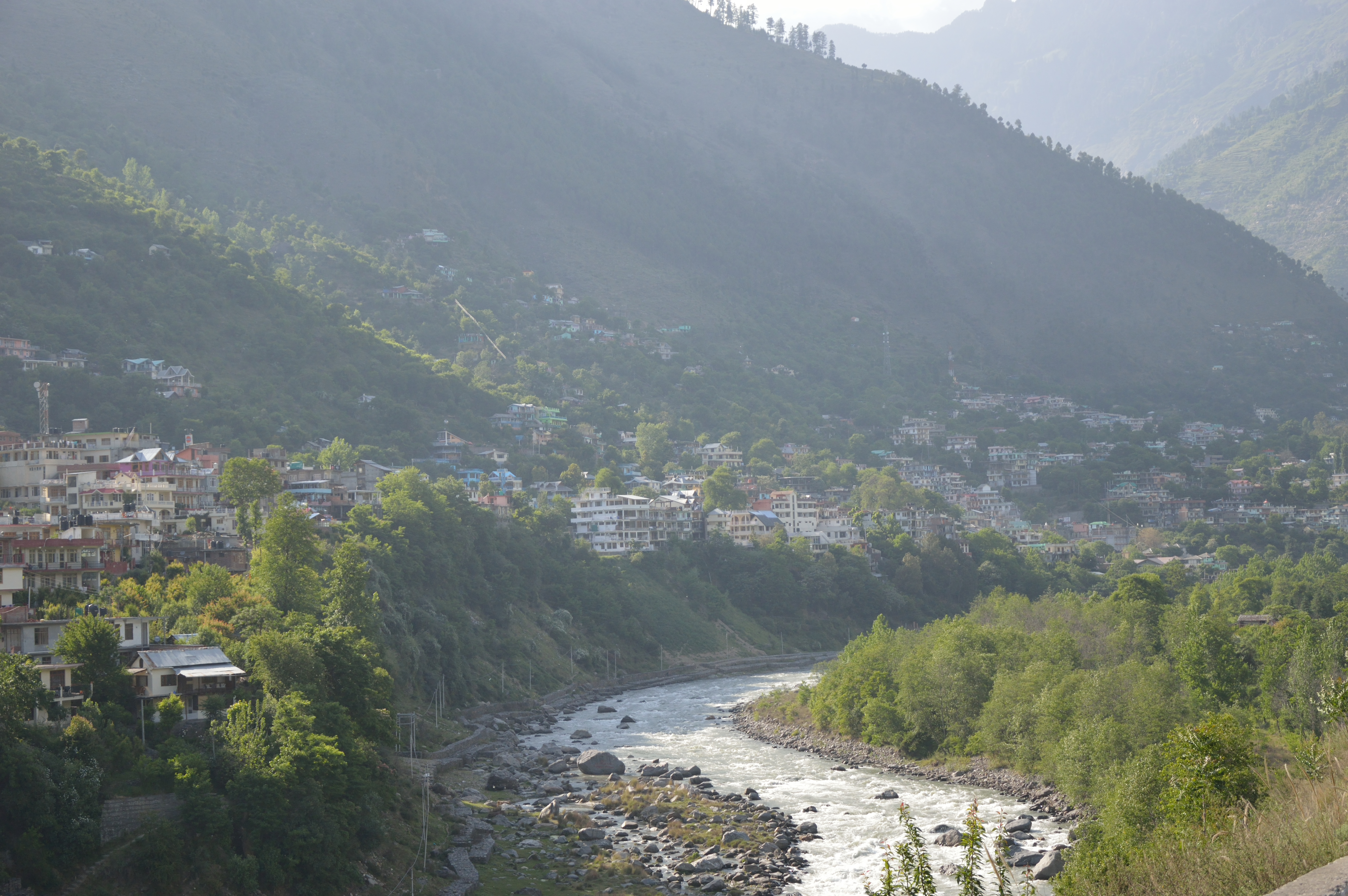
- Kullu Valley, Beas River

- Location in Himachal Pradesh, India Kullu (India)
- Coordinates: 31.95°N 77.11°E
- Country: India
- State: Himachal Pradesh
- District: Kullu

Government
  - Type: Democratic
- Elevation: 1,279 m (4,196 ft)

Population (2011)
  - Total: 18,536
  - Rank: 11th in HP

Languages
  - Official: Hindi
  - Native: Kullui
- Time zone: UTC+5:30 (IST)
- PIN: 175101
- Telephone code: 01902
- Vehicle registration: HP-34, HP-35, HP-49, HP-58, HP-66
- Sex ratio: 1.17 (1000/852) ♂/♀
- Website: www.hpkullu.nic.in

Kullu (Hindi: [kʊlːuː]) is a municipal council town that serves as the administrative headquarters of the Kullu district of the Indian state of Himachal Pradesh. It is located on the banks of the Beas River in the Kullu Valley about 10 kilometres (6.2 mi) north of the airport at Bhuntar, Kullu. The river, originating from Beas Kund, passes a succession of hillside settlements amongst forests of deodar, with pine trees on the lower rocky ridges. Kullu Valley is located between the Pir Panjal, Lower Himalayan and Great Himalayan Ranges, located in Northern India, 497 kilometres (309 mi) away from India's capital.

== History ==
Historical references about the Kullu valley date back to ancient Hindu literary works of the Ramayana, Mahabharata and the Puranas. During Vedic period several small republics known as "Janapada" existed which were later conquered by the Nanda Empire, Mauryan Empire, Shunga Empire, Gupta Empire, Pala Dynasty and Karkoṭa Empire. After a brief period of supremacy by King Harshavardhana, the region was once again divided into several local powers headed by chieftains, including some Rajput principalities, these principalities were later conquered by Mughal Empire, Maratha Empire, Sikh Empire.

The Buddhist pilgrim monk Xuanzang visited the Kullu Valley in 634 or 635 CE. He described it as a fertile region completely surrounded by mountains, about 3,000 li in circuit, with a capital 14 or 15 li in circumference. There were some twenty Buddhist monasteries, with about 1,000 monks, most of whom following the Mahayana tradition. There were also some fifteen Hindu temples, and both faiths occupied the region. There were meditation caves near the mountain passes inhabited by both Buddhist and Hindus. The country is said to have produced gold, silver, red copper, crystal lenses and bell-metal. In 1650, during the reign of ruler Jagat Singh of Kullu, Raghunath Temple was established after Pandit Damodar (a priest) took the idol of Shri Rama from Ayodhya's Tretanath Temple to Kullu.

== Geography ==
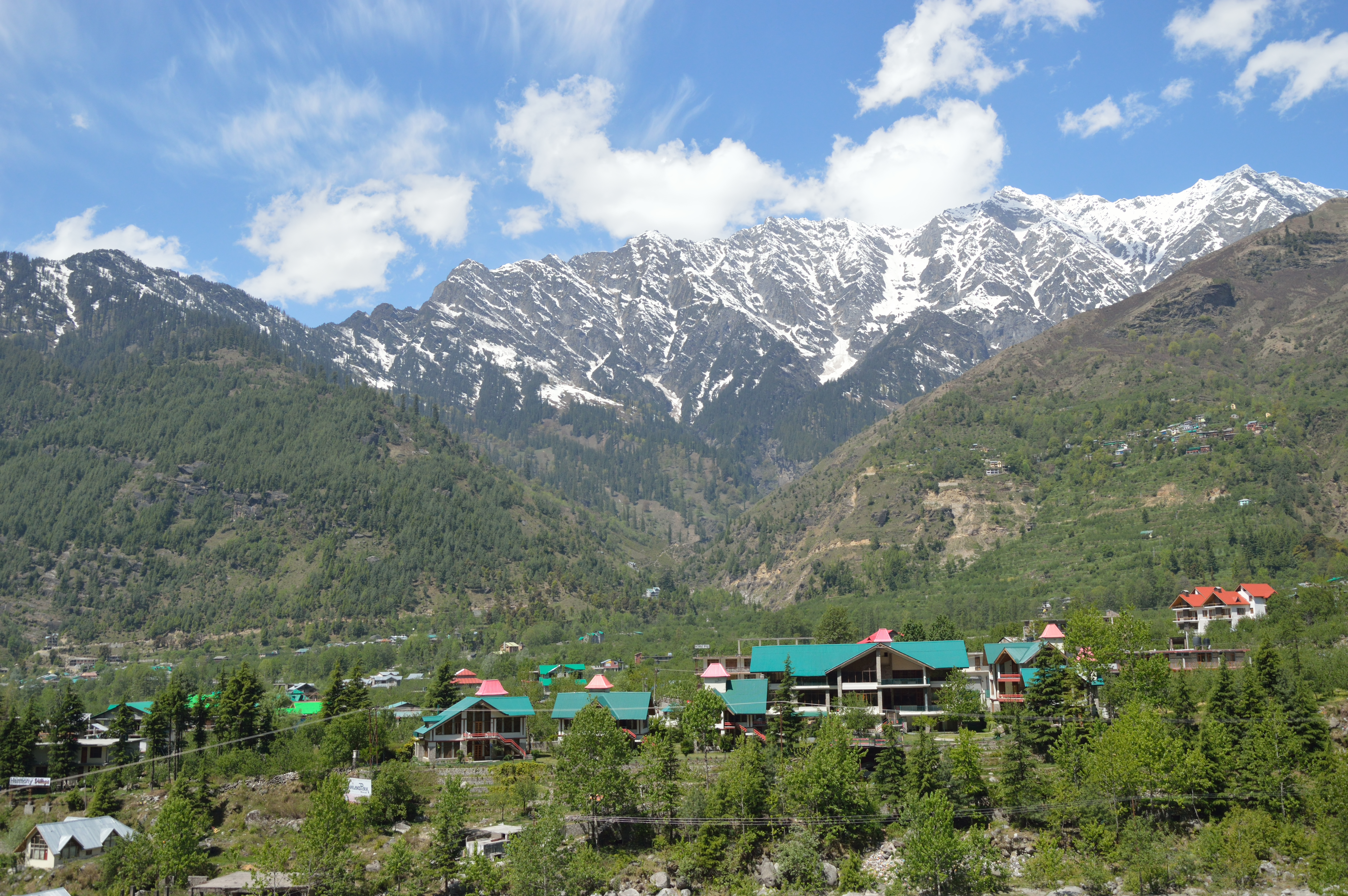
Kullu town lies on the bank of Beas River.

Kullu town has an average elevation of 1,278 m (4,193 ft). It lies on the bank of Beas River.

== Demographics ==
As of 2011 India census, Kullu had a population of 437,903. The male population in Kullu is 225,452 whereas the female population is 212,451. The sex ratio of Kullu is 942 females per 1000 males, which is higher than the national average sex ratio. The average literacy rate of Kullu is 79.4%; the male literacy rate is 87.39% and the female literacy rate is 70.91%. The people speak the Kullui language.

== Administrative ==
Kullu town, as the administrative headquarters of Kullu district, has the offices of Deputy Commissioner, the Superintendent of Police and the District courts.
