= List of Kodandarama temples =

There are several Hindu temples dedicated to Kodandarama or Kothandarama (a depiction of Rama holding his bow). Many temples also include the honorific swamy in their names.

== Andhra Pradesh ==
- Kodandarama Temple, Vontimitta, in Kadapa District
- Kodandarama Temple, Buchireddipalem, in Nellore District

== Karnataka ==
- Kodandarama Temple, Hiremagalur in Chikkamagaluru district

== Tamil Nadu ==
- Kothandaramaswamy Temple, at Rameswaram in the Ramanathapuram District
- Kothandaramar Temple, West Mambalam in Chennai
- Kothandaramaswami Temple, Nandambakkam in the Kanchipuram District
- Kothandarama Temple, Thillaivilagam in Thiruvarur District
- Kothandaramar swamy Temple, Vaduvur in Thiruvarur
