= Kodandarama Temple, Buchireddipalem =

Hindu temple dedicated to the god Rama

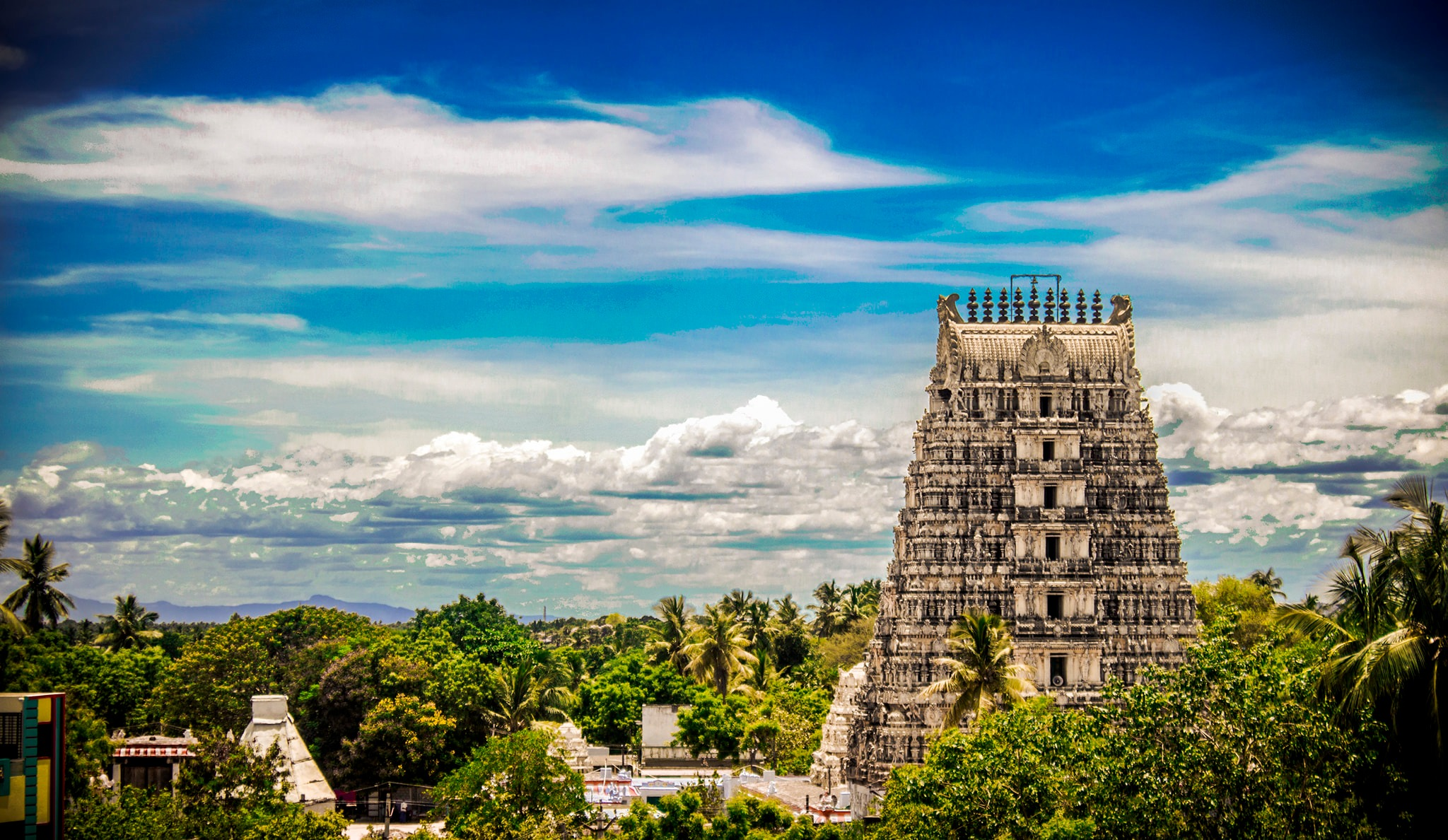
The temple

Sri Kodandarama Swami Devastanam is a Hindu temple dedicated to the god Rama located in the town of Buchireddypalem in SPSR Nellore District, in Andhra Pradesh, India. The temple covers an area of 2 acres. The temple has two entries, of which one is prominent and has a larger gateway tower called as Gopuram. Another entry has a small door on the right side of the temple. The Gopuram is 100 feet in height and the second-tallest Gopuram in Andhra Pradesh.

== History ==
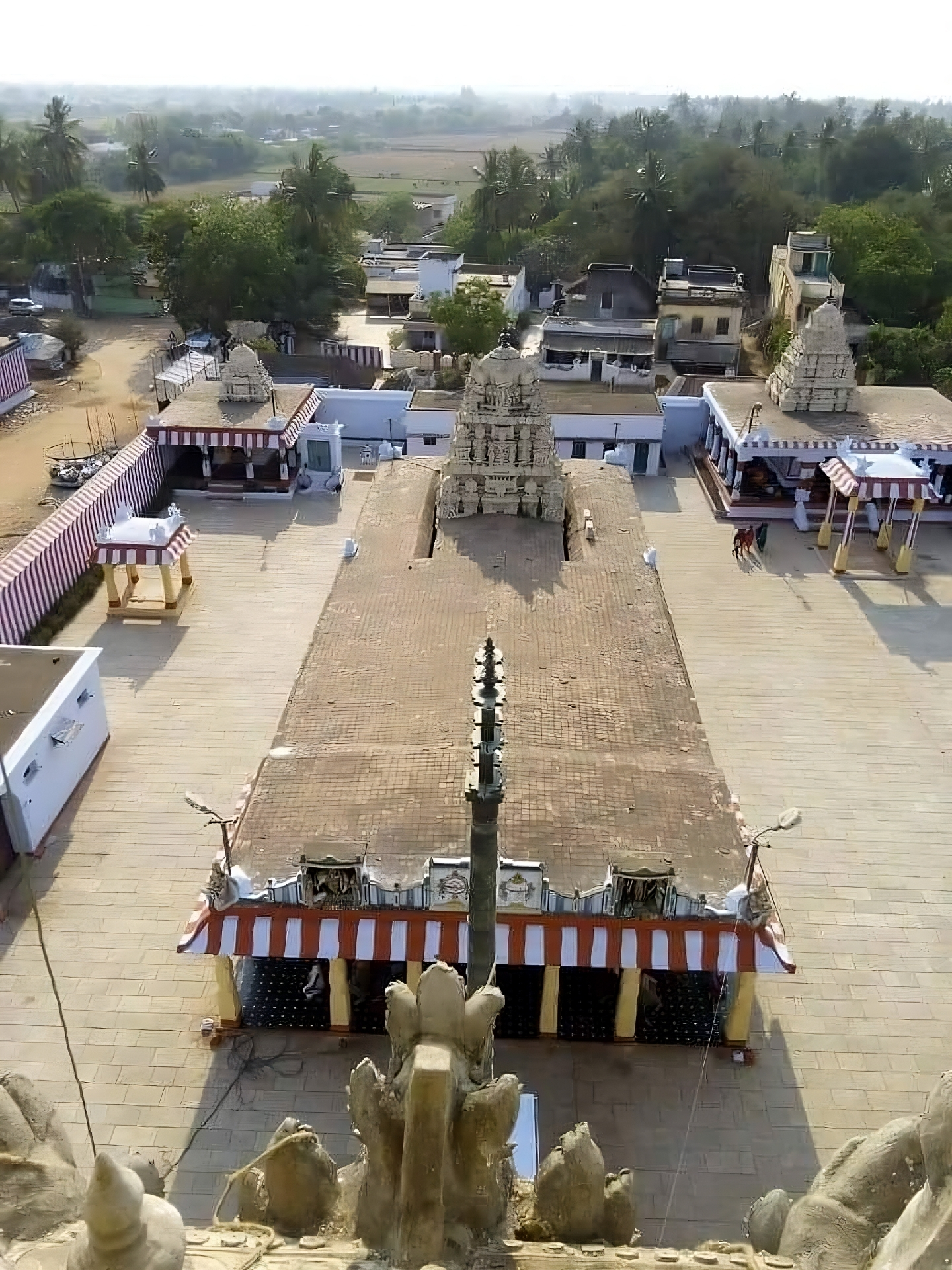

In the year 1715, Dodla Anna Reddy, a farmer from Ranavathuru village in Chengalpattu District of Tamil Nadu, came to Buchireddypalem and settled well. After good recognition from the British Government, he managed to become an administrative officer for the nearby regions of Duvvur and Kandukuru.

His grandson, Dodla Rami Reddy, also known as 'Bangaru Rami Reddy', started the construction of the temple in the year 1765. It is believed that Rama appeared in the dream of Dodla Rami Reddy and was instructed to build the temple in the town of Buchireddypalem. After 19 years in 1784, the construction was completed successfully. The whole temple was constructed using stone.

Along with the main deity Rama, additionally, there are smalls shires for other deities named Chaturbhuja Lakshmi, Lakshmi Narasimha, Andal and Hanuman (Anjaneya).

== Significance ==
Brahmotsavams have been held every year since, commencing on the Sri Rama Navami day, which falls in the Chaitra month (April–May) of the Hindu calendar.

People from various villages, cities, and other countries visit the temple and take the blessings of the Lord Sri ram.

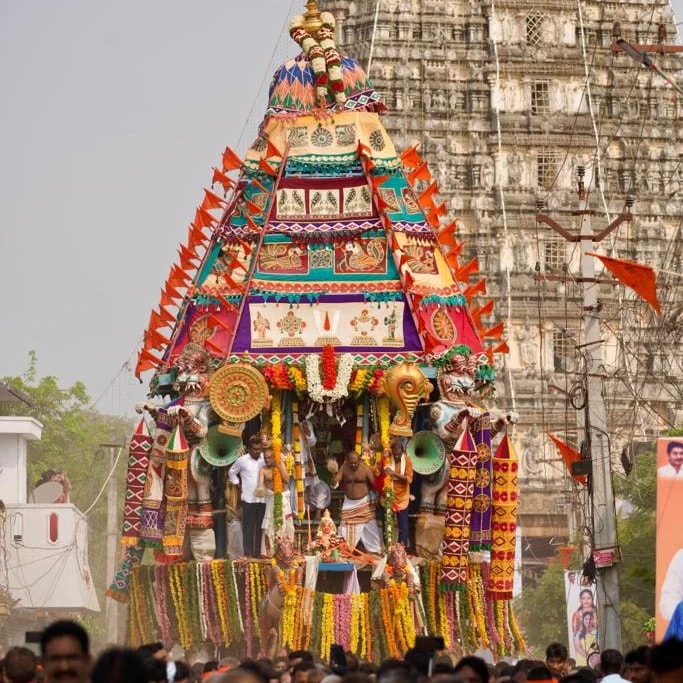

One of the major attractions during Brahmhotsavam is pulling the chariot. The chariot contains the idols of the deities Sri Ram, Maa Sita, Lakshman, and Hanuman. Hundreds of people pull the chariot with the help of chains.
