= Kothandaramar Temple, West Mambalam =

Religion
- Affiliation: Hinduism
- District: Chennai
- Deity: Lord Rama

Location
- Location: Chennai
- State: Tamil Nadu
- Country: India

The Kothandaramar Temple is a Hindu temple in the neighbourhood of West Mambalam in Chennai, India. The temple is dedicated to the Hindu god Rama known as "Pattabhirama". Sita as "Piratti" is the consort. The temple also got a large temple tank built within the premises. The temple is situated close to the Mambalam railway station and is more than 150 years old. Vaikunta Ekadasi is celebrated with fanfare.

== See also ==
- Religion in Chennai
