= Robert P. Goldman =

20th century American scholar of Sanskrit

- Born: 1942 (age 83–84)
- Occupations: Professor, translator
- Title: William and Catherine Magistretti Distinguished Professor of Sanskrit
- Spouse: Sally Goldman (née Sutherland)

Academic background
- Education: Ph.D., A.B.
- Alma mater: University of Pennsylvania, Columbia College

Academic work
- Discipline: Sanskrit scholar
- Institutions: University of California, Berkeley
- Website: http://sseas.berkeley.edu/people/faculty/robert-p-goldman

Robert Philip Goldman (born 1942) is the William and Catherine Magistretti Distinguished Professor of Sanskrit at the Department of South and Southeast Asian Studies at the University of California, Berkeley, and a Fellow of the American Academy of Arts and Sciences since April 1996.

Goldman was born in 1942. He went to Columbia College and obtained an A.B. degree in 1964. He also received a Ph.D. from the University of Pennsylvania in 1971. Goldman is notable for his English translation of the Rāmāyaṇa published by Princeton University Press in 7 volumes between 1990 and 2019. His co-translators on the work included Sheldon I. Pollock, Rosalind Lefeber, Barend A. van Nooten, and Sally J. Sutherland Goldman. Goldman received the Sanskrit Award for 2017 by the Indian Council on Cultural Relations (ICCR).
