= Rama =

Major deity in Hinduism

- The Ideal Man; Embodiment of Dharma; The Supreme Being (Ramanandi)
- Member of Dashavatara
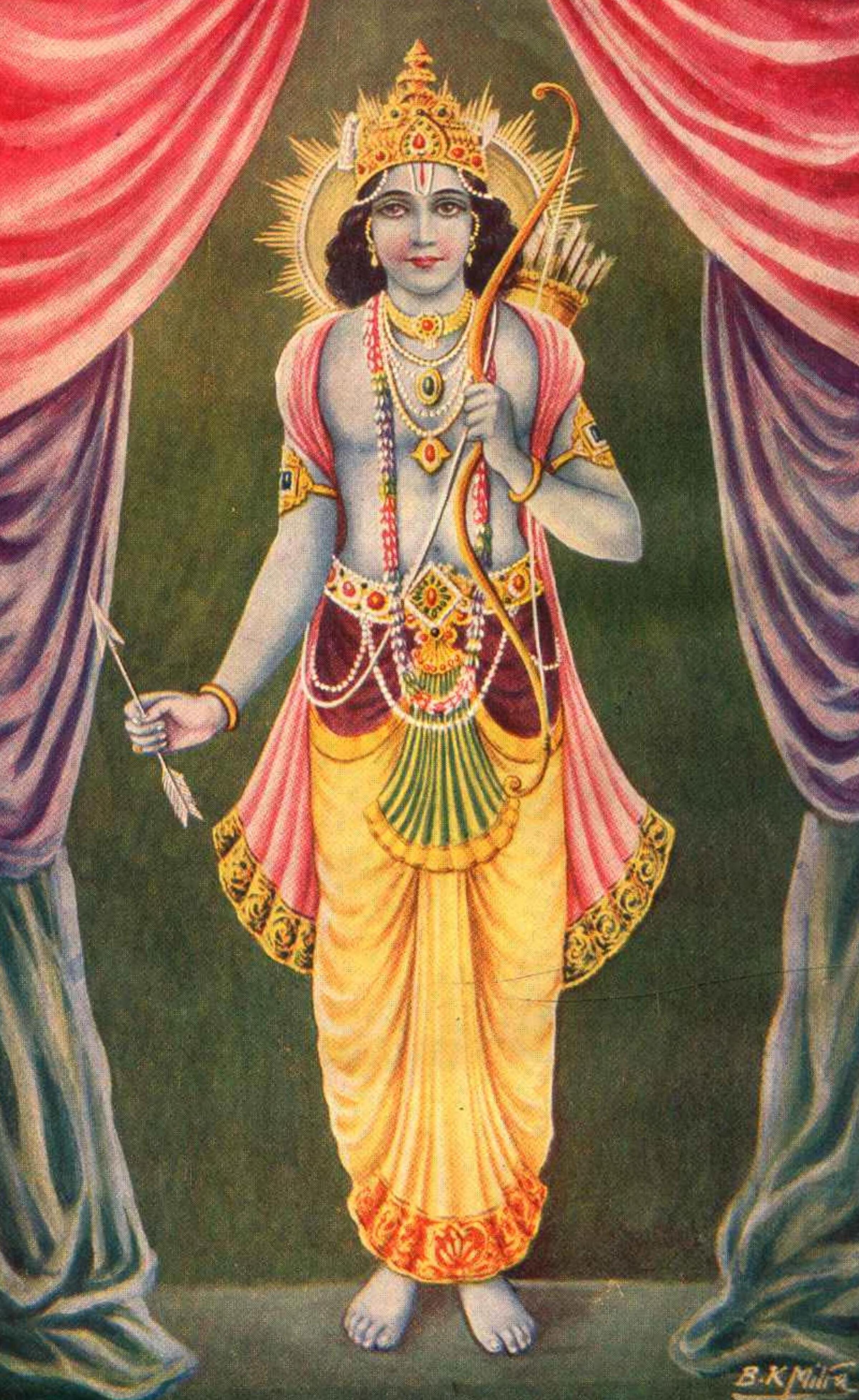
- Rama holding a bow and arrow, early 20th century depiction
- Other names: Ramachandra, Raghava, Maryada Purushottama
- Devanagari: राम
- Sanskrit transliteration: Rāma
- Venerated in: Ramanandi Sampradaya; Sri Vaishnavism; Smartism
- Affiliation: Seventh avatar of Vishnu, Dashavatara, Brahman, Vaishnavism
- Predecessor: Dasharatha
- Successor: Lava (North Kosala) Kusha (South Kosala)
- Abode: Ayodhya; Saketa; Vaikuntha
- Mantra: Jai Shri Ram; Jai Siya Ram; Hare Rama; Ramanama repetition
- Weapon: Sharanga (bow) and arrows
- Army: Vanara Sena; Ayodhyan Army
- Symbol: Sharanga (bow); Arrows
- Day: Thursday
- Texts: Ramayana and its other versions
- Gender: Male
- Festivals: Rama Navami; Vivaha Panchami; Diwali; Vijayadashami; Vasanthotsavam

Genealogy
- Avatar birth: Ayodhya, Kosala (present-day Uttar Pradesh, India)
- Avatar end: Sarayu River, Ayodhya, Kosala (present-day Uttar Pradesh, India)
- Parents: Dasharatha (father); Kausalya (mother); Kaikeyi (step-mother); Sumitra (step-mother)
- Siblings: Shanta (Sister); Lakshmana (half-brother); Bharata (half-brother); Shatrughna (half-brother)
- Spouse: Sita
- Children: Lava (son); Kusha (son)
- Dynasty: Raghuvamsha-Suryavamsha

Dashavatara Sequence
- Predecessor: Parashurama
- Successor: Krishna

Rama (/ˈrɑːmə/; Sanskrit: राम, IAST: Rāma, Sanskrit: [ˈraːmɐ]), also known as Ram (Note: Many Indian languages, such as Hindi, delete the terminal 'a' sound in Sanskrit words. Others, such as Tamil and Malayalam, have their own suffixes; -r and -n in this case. Schwa deletion in Indo-Aryan languages.), is a major deity in Hinduism, who is worshipped as one of the prominent avatars of Vishnu. Rama is considered an ideal man (maryāda puruṣottama) and is the heroic protagonist of the Hindu epic Ramayana. In Rama-centric Hindu traditions, he is considered the Supreme Being. Often respectfully referred to as Sri Rama, his life is celebrated through several festivals: birth on Rama Navami, victory in battle on Vijayadashami, and return to Ayodhya on Diwali, which is marked by lights and fireworks. Legends of Rama also feature in the texts of Jainism and Buddhism.

According to the Ramayana of Valmiki, Rama was born to Dasaratha and his first wife Kausalya in Ayodhya, the capital of the kingdom of Kosala. His half-siblings included Lakshmana, Bharata, and Shatrughna. He married Sita and after a 14-year exile in the forest, assumed the Kosala throne. Rama's forest exile was filled with difficult circumstances and challenges of ethical questions and moral dilemmas, including the kidnapping of Sita by the demon-king Ravana. Many Hindus see the life story of Rama as illustrating dharma and dharmic living.

Rama is especially important to Vaishnavism, being the seventh avatar of Vishnu. He is the central figure in the ancient epic Ramayana, a text historically popular in the South Asian and Southeast Asian cultures. His ancient legends have attracted bhashya (commentaries) and extensive secondary literature and inspired performance arts. Two such texts, for example, are the Adhyatma Ramayana – a spiritual and theological treatise considered foundational by Ramanandi monasteries, and the Ramcharitmanas – a popular treatise that inspires thousands of Ramlila festival performances during autumn every year in India.

The texts of Jainism and Buddhism also recount several tales of Rama, though he is sometimes called Pauma or Padma in these texts, and their details vary significantly from the Hindu versions. Jain Texts also mention Rama as the eighth balabhadra among the 63 salakapurusas. In Sikhism, Rama is mentioned as twentieth of the twenty-four divine avatars of Vishnu in the Chaubis Avtar in Dasam Granth.

== Etymology and nomenclature ==
Rama is also known as Ram, Raman, Ramar, and Ramachandra (/ˌrɑːməˈtʃəndrə/; IAST: Rāmacandra, Sanskrit: रामचन्द्र). Rāma is a Vedic Sanskrit word with two contextual meanings. In one context, as found in Atharva Veda, as stated by Monier Monier-Williams, it means "dark, dark-colored, black". In another context in other Vedic texts, the word means "pleasing, delightful, charming, beautiful, lovely". The word is sometimes used as a suffix in different Indian languages and religions, such as Pali in Buddhist texts, where -rama adds the sense of "pleasing to the mind, lovely" to the composite word. Many scholars also refer to "Rama" as "Ram", often due to its wide usage, while the honorific titles, Shri or Sri are also commonly used with Rama.

Rama as a first name appears in the Vedic literature, associated with two patronymic names – Margaveya and Aupatasvini – representing different individuals. A third individual named Rama Jamadagnya is the purported author of hymn 10.110 of the Rigveda in the Hindu tradition. The word Rama appears in ancient literature in reverential terms for three individuals:

1. Parashu-rama, as the sixth avatar of Vishnu. He is linked to the Rama Jamadagnya of the Rigveda fame.
2. Rama-chandra, as the seventh avatar of Vishnu and of the ancient Ramayana fame.
3. Bala-rama, also called Halayudha, as the elder brother of Krishna both of whom appear in the legends of Hinduism, Buddhism and Jainism.

The name Rama appears repeatedly in Hindu texts, for many different scholars and kings in mythical stories. The word also appears in ancient Upanishads and Aranyakas layer of Vedic literature, as well as music and other post-Vedic literature, but in qualifying context of something or someone who is "charming, beautiful, lovely" or "darkness, night".

The Vishnu avatar named Rama is also known by other names. He is called Ramachandra (beautiful, lovely moon), or Dasarathi (son of Dasaratha), or Raghava (descendant of Raghu, solar dynasty in Hindu cosmology).

Additional names of Rama include Ramavijaya (Javanese), Phreah Ream (Khmer), Phra Ram (Lao and Thai), Megat Seri Rama (Malay), Raja Bantugan (Maranao), Ramar or Raman (Tamil), and Ramudu (Telugu). In the Vishnu sahasranama, Rama is the 394th name of Vishnu. In some Advaita Vedanta inspired texts, Rama connotes the metaphysical concept of Supreme Brahman who is the eternally blissful spiritual Self (Atman, soul) in whom yogis delight nondualistically.

The root of the word Rama is ram- which means "stop, stand still, rest, rejoice, be pleased".

=== Significance of Rama ===
Rama is a prominent Hindu deity who is regarded as a Pūrṇāvatāra (lit. 'complete avatar') of the God Vishnu. (Note: The avatars of Vishnu are of two types. Pūrṇā and Amśa (lit. 'A part'). In the former, Vishnu himself was supposed to have descended on Earth from his abode while in the latter, an equivalent part (or a copy) of him was sent to take the incarnation. Nrisimha, Rama and Krishna are said to be the Purnavataras of Vishnu.) Some Hindus view Rama as Para Brahman (lit. 'The ultimate Brahman'). Rama holds immense significance in Hinduism. According to Hindu mythology, the Rama avatar is not supposed to exhibit any of Vishnu's divine potencies, and he leads his life as a human. As Rama is said to have possessed sixteen ideal qualities, Hindus view Rama as Puruṣottama (lit. 'Ideal man') and Vigrahavān dharmaḥ (lit. 'Embodiment of Dharma'). (Note: As per Valmiki Ramayana, Rama had sixteen qualities. Rama was said to be 1.guṇavān, 2.vīryavān, 3.dharmajñaḥ, 4.kṛtajñaḥ, 5.satyavākyaḥ, 6.dṛḍhavrataḥ, 7.cāritraḥ, 8.sarvabhūteṣu hitaḥ, 9.vidvān, 10.samarthaḥ, 11. priyadarśanaḥ, 12.ātmavān, 13.jitakrodhaḥ, 14.dyutimān, 15. anasūyakaḥ, and 16.jātaroṣasya saṃyuge devāśca bibhyati.)

The name Rama appears in the main body of the Vishnu Sahasranama as the 394th name of the Hindu God Vishnu. (Note: The Vishnu Sahasranama is one of the most widely recited and deeply revered stotras in Hinduism.) In the phalaśruti (lit. 'The benefit of hearing') of the Vishnu Sahasranama, there is a famous concluding verse, where Lord Siva says to his consort Parvati that I constantly delight in chanting the name of 'Rama, Rama, Rama'. The chanting of this single name of Sri Rama is equal to reciting the entire thousand names of Lord Vishnu. Within the Hindu theology, the Trayodaśakṣarī mantra ((lit. '13-syllabled mantra')) also known as Śrī Rāma Tāraka Mantra (lit. 'The Rama mantra for Salvation'), is a powerful invocation for spiritual liberation.

== Legends ==
This summary is a traditional legendary account, based on literary details from the Ramayana and other historic mythology-containing texts of Buddhism and Jainism. According to Sheldon Pollock, the figure of Rama incorporates more ancient "morphemes of Indian myths", such as the mythical legends of Bali and Namuci. The ancient sage Valmiki used these morphemes in his Ramayana similes as in sections 3.27, 3.59, 3.73, 5.19 and 29.28.

=== Birth ===
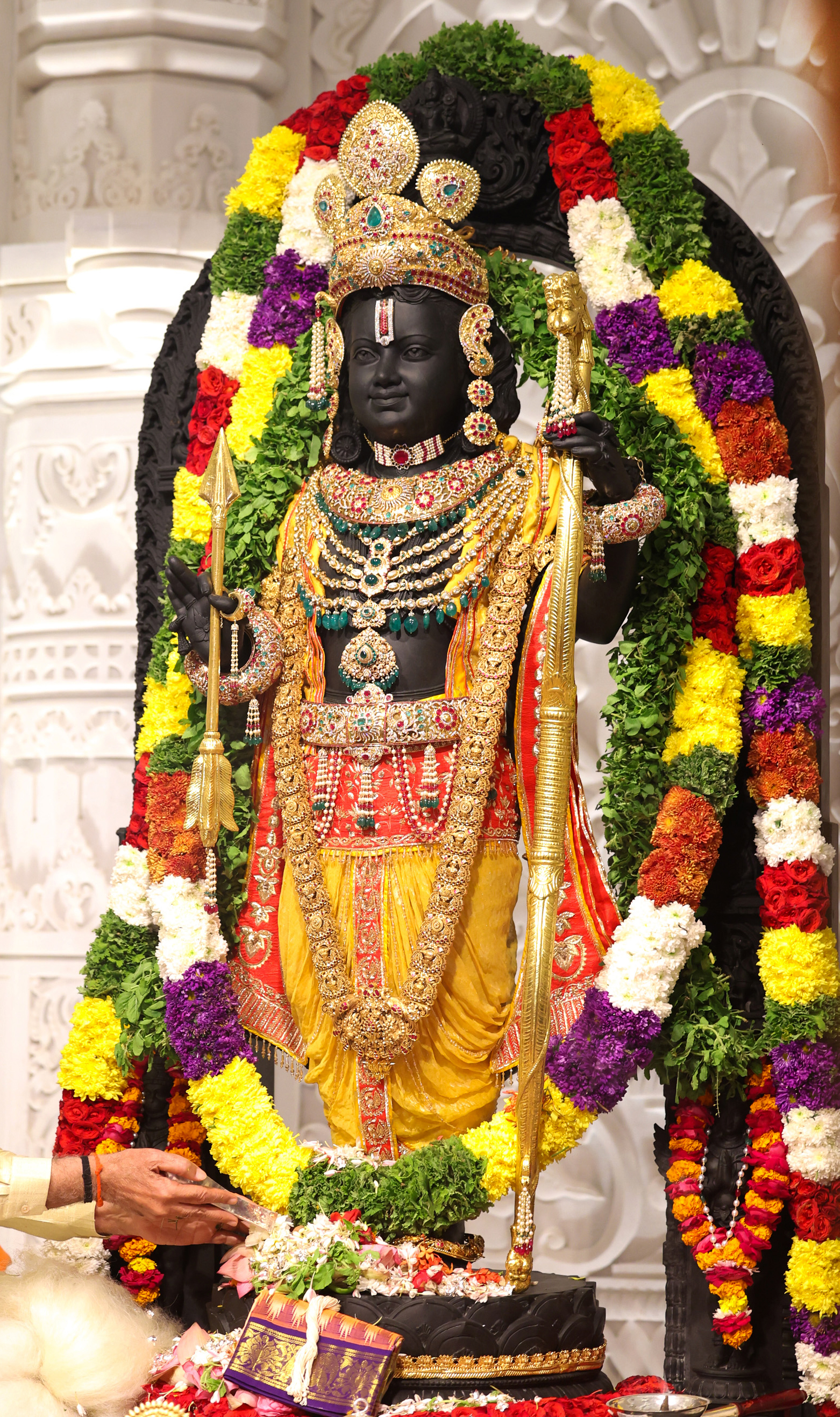
Balak Ram, the 5-year-old form of Rama, is the principal deity of the Ram Mandir in Ram Janmabhoomi

The ancient epic Ramayana states in the Balakanda that Rama and his brothers were born to Kaushalya and Dasharatha in Ayodhya, a city on the banks of Sarayu River. The Jain versions of the Ramayana, such as the Paumacariya (literally deeds of Padma) by Vimalasuri, also mention the details of the early life of Rama. The Jain texts are dated variously, but generally pre-500 CE, most likely sometime within the first five centuries of the common era. Moriz Winternitz states that the Valmiki Ramayana was already famous before it was recast in the Jain Paumacariya poem, dated to the second half of the 1st century CE, which pre-dates a similar retelling found in the Buddha-carita of Asvagosa, dated to the beginning of the 2nd century CE or prior.

Dasharatha was the king of Kosala, and a part of the Kshatriya solar dynasty of Iksvakus. His mother's name Kaushalya literally implies that she was from Kosala. The kingdom of Kosala is also mentioned in Buddhist and Jain texts, as one of the sixteen Maha janapadas of ancient India, and as an important center of pilgrimage for Jains and Buddhists. However, there is a scholarly dispute whether the modern Ayodhya is indeed the same as the Ayodhya and Kosala mentioned in the Ramayana and other ancient Indian texts. (Note: Kosala is mentioned in many Buddhist texts and travel memoirs. The Buddha idol of Kosala is important in the Theravada Buddhism tradition, and one that is described by the 7th-century Chinese pilgrim Xuanzhang. He states in his memoir that the statue stands in the capital of Kosala then called Shravasti, midst ruins of a large monastery. He also states that he brought back to China two replicas of the Buddha, one of the Kosala icon of Udayana and another the Prasenajit icon of Prasenajit.) The Dhanadeva inscription, found at Ayodhya, dated to the first century BCE, is often noted as evidence of the city existing through ancient times.

Rama's birth, according to Ramayana, is an incarnation of God (Vishnu) as human. When demigods went to Brahma to seek liberation from Ravana's menace on the Earth (due to powers he had from Brahma's boon to him), Vishnu himself appeared and said he will incarnate as Rama (human) and kill Ravana (since Brahma's boon made him invincible from all, including God, except humans).

=== Youth, family and marriage to Sita ===
Rama had three brothers, according to the Balakanda section of the Ramayana. These were Lakshmana, Bharata and Shatrughna. The extant manuscripts of the text describes their education and training as young princes, but this is brief. Rama is portrayed as a polite, self-controlled, virtuous youth always ready to help others. His education included the Vedas, the Vedangas as well as the martial arts.

The years when Rama grew up are described in much greater detail by later Hindu texts, such as the Ramavali by Tulsidas. The template is similar to those found for Krishna, but in the poems of Tulsidas, Rama is milder and reserved introvert, rather than the prank-playing extrovert personality of Krishna.

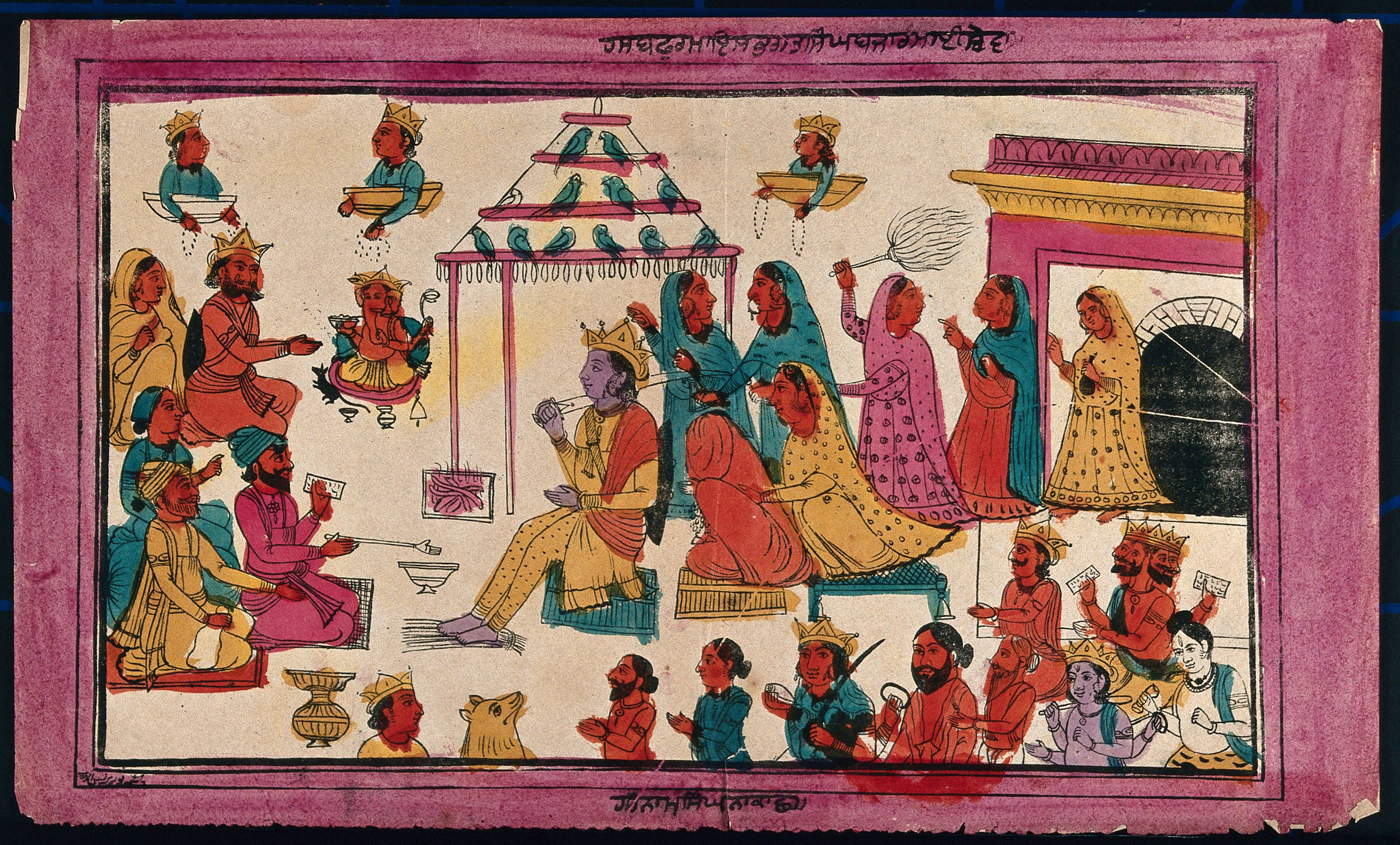
The marriage ceremony of Rama and Sita.

In the kingdom of Mithilā, Siradhwaja Janaka conducted a svayamvara ceremony known as Sita Svayamvara at his capital with the condition that she would marry only a prince who would possess the strength to string the ajagava, one of the bows of the deity Shiva. Many princes attempted and failed to string the bow. During this time, Vishvamitra had brought Rama and his brother Lakshmana to the forest for the protection of a yajna (ritual sacrifice). Hearing about the svayamvara, Vishvamitra asked Rama to participate in the ceremony with the consent of Janaka, who agreed to offer Sita's hand in marriage to the prince if he could fulfil the requisite task. When the bow was brought before him, Rama seized the centre of the weapon, fastened the string taut, and broke it in two in the process. Witnessing his prowess, Janaka agreed to marry his daughter to Rama and invited Dasharatha to his capital. During the homeward journey to Ayodhya, another avatar of Vishnu, Parashurama, challenged Rama to combat, on the condition that he was able to string the bow of Vishnu, Sharanga. When Rama obliged him with success, Parashurama acknowledged the former to be a form of Vishnu and departed to perform penance at the mountain Mahendra. The wedding entourage then reached Ayodhya, entering the city amid great fanfare. Thereafter, Rama lived happily with Sita for twelve (12) years.

Meanwhile, Rama and his brothers were away, Kaikeyi, the mother of Bharata and the third wife of King Dasharatha, reminds the king that he had promised long ago to comply with one thing she asks, anything. Dasharatha remembers and agrees to do so. She demands that Rama be exiled for fourteen years to Dandaka forest. Dasharatha grieves at her request. Her son Bharata, and other family members become upset at her demand. Rama states that his father should keep his word, adds that he does not crave for earthly or heavenly material pleasures, and seeks neither power nor anything else. He informs of his decision to his wife and tells everyone that time passes quickly. Sita leaves with him to live in the forest, and Lakshmana joins them in their exile as the caring close brother.

=== Exile and war ===
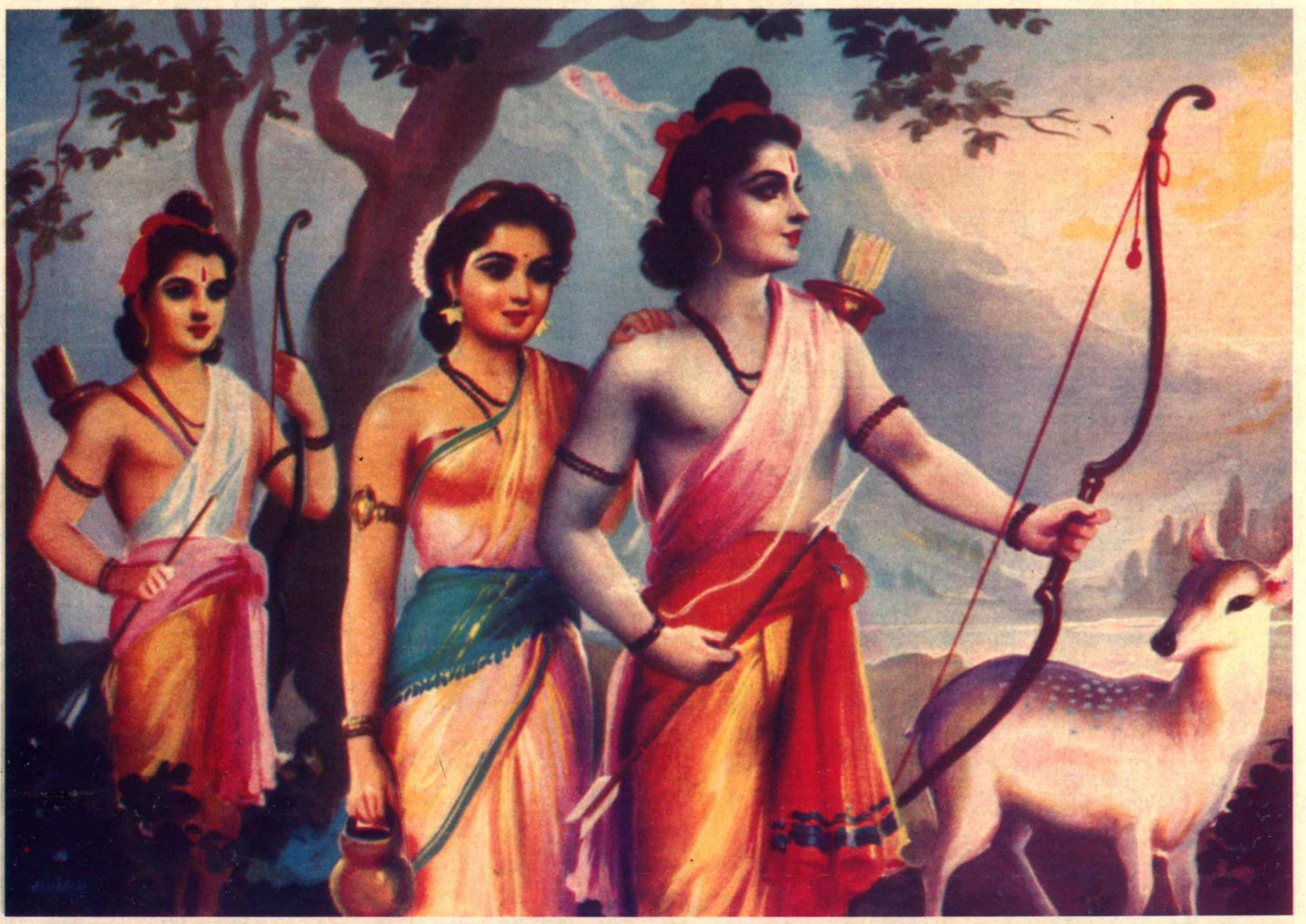
Rama, along with his younger brother Lakshmana and wife Sita, exiled to the forest.

Rama heads outside the Kosala kingdom, crosses Yamuna river and initially stays at Chitrakuta, on the banks of river Mandakini, in the hermitage of sage Vasishtha. During the exile, Rama meets one of his devotee, Shabari who happened to love him so much that when Rama asked something to eat she offered her ber, a fruit. But every time she gave it to him she first tasted it to ensure that it was sweet and tasty as a testament to her devotion. Rama also understood her devotion and ate all the half-eaten bers given by her. Such was the reciprocation of love and compassion he had for his people. This place is believed in the Hindu tradition to be the same as Chitrakoot on the border of Uttar Pradesh and Madhya Pradesh. The region has numerous Rama temples and is an important Vaishnava pilgrimage site. The texts describe nearby hermitages of Vedic rishis (sages) such as Atri, and that Rama roamed through forests, lived a humble simple life, provided protection and relief to ascetics in the forest being harassed and persecuted by demons, as they stayed at different ashrams.

After ten years of wandering and struggles, Rama arrives at Panchavati, on the banks of river Godavari. This region had numerous demons (rakshashas). One day, a demoness called Shurpanakha saw Rama, became enamored of him, and tried to seduce him. Rama refused her. Shurpanakha retaliated by threatening Sita. Lakshmana, the younger brother protective of his family, in turn retaliated by cutting off the nose and ears of Shurpanakha. The cycle of violence escalated, ultimately reaching demon king Ravana, who was the brother of Shurpanakha. Ravana comes to Panchavati to take revenge on behalf of his family, sees Sita, gets attracted, ask Maricha, his uncle, to disguised himself as a magnificent deer to lure Sita, and kidnaps her to his kingdom of Lanka (believed to be modern Sri Lanka).

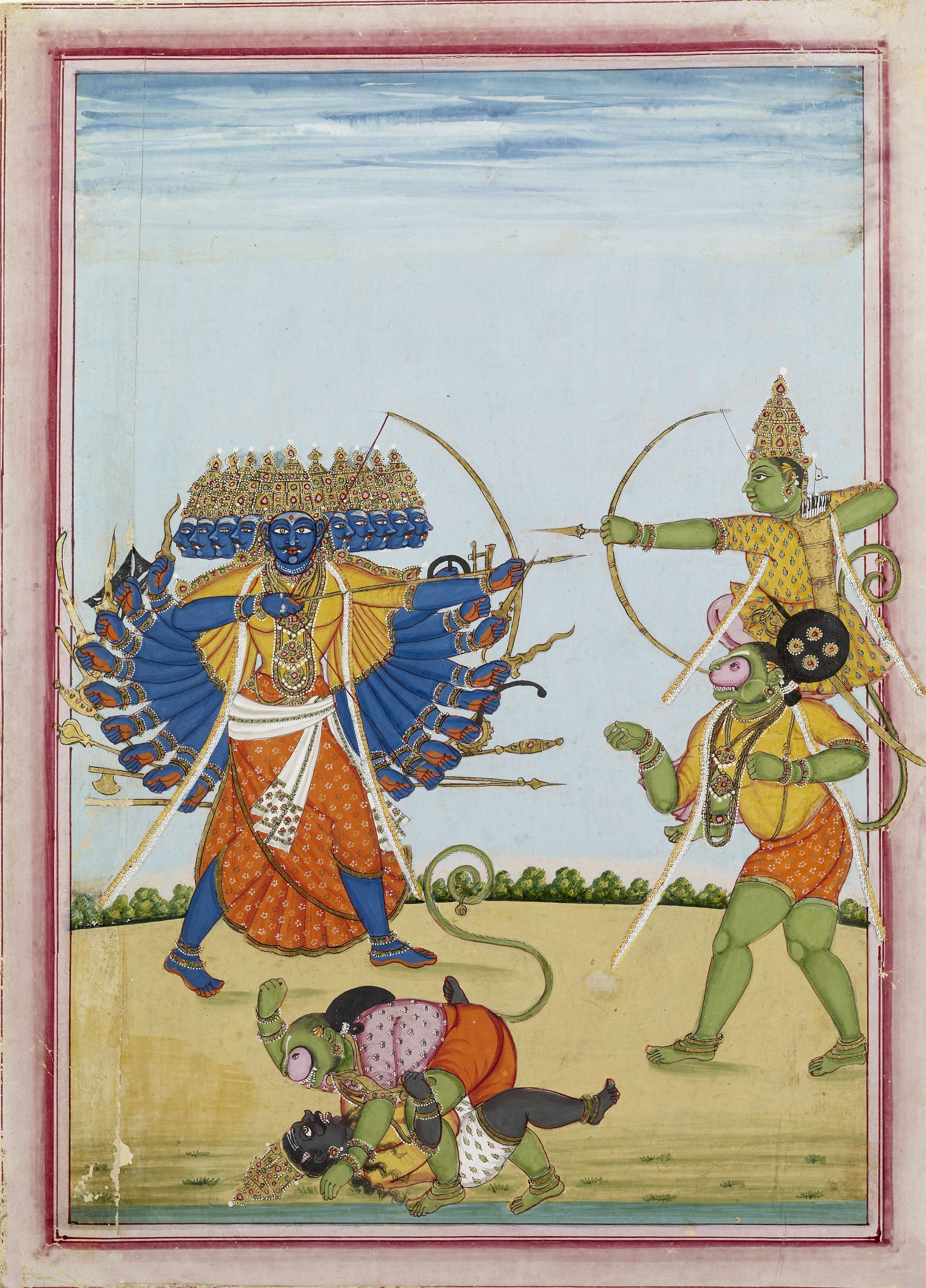
Rama seated on back of Hanuman (right) fights Ravana, c. 1820

Rama and Lakshmana discover the kidnapping, worry about Sita's safety, despair at the loss and their lack of resources to take on Ravana. Their struggles now reach new heights. They travel south, meet Sugriva, marshall an army of monkeys, and attract dedicated commanders such as Hanuman who was a minister of Sugriva. According to regional Shakta traditions, during his exile and search for Sita, Rama visited the forests of South India where he met Vaishno Devi. She was performing rigorous penance to attain Vishnu as her husband. Rama politely declined her proposal, citing his vow of monogamy to Sita, but promised to visit her again after conquering Lanka. According to the legend, Rama returned on his journey back to Ayodhya but deliberately disguised himself as an old ascetic. When Vaishnavi's vision was clouded by his illusion and she failed to recognize him, Rama consoled her and explained that her life had a higher cosmic purpose. He instructed her to travel north to the three-peaked Trikuta Mountain in Jammu to meditate in a holy cave and spread righteousness, sending Hanuman to accompany and protect her. Rama also granted her a boon that at the end of the Kali Yuga, he would return in his final incarnation as Kalki to marry her. Meanwhile, Ravana harasses Sita to be his wife, queen or goddess. Sita refuses him. Ravana gets enraged and ultimately reaches Lanka, fights in a war that has many ups and downs, but ultimately Rama prevails, kills Ravana and forces of evil, and rescues his wife Sita. They return to Ayodhya.

=== Post-war life ===
The return of Rama to Ayodhya was celebrated with his coronation. It is called Rama pattabhisheka, and his rule itself as Rama rajya described to be a just and fair rule. It is believed by many that when Rama returned people celebrated their happiness with diyas (lamps), and the festival of Diwali is connected with Rama's return.

Upon Rama's accession as king, rumours emerge that Sita may have gone willingly when she was with Ravana; Sita protests that her capture was forced. Rama responds to public gossip by renouncing his wife and asking her to prove her chastity in front of Agni (fire). She does and passes the test. Rama and Sita live happily together in Ayodhya, have twin sons named Kusha and Lava, in the Ramayana and other major texts. However, in some revisions, the story is different and tragic, with Sita dying of sorrow for her husband not trusting her, making Sita a moral heroine and leaving the reader with moral questions about Rama. In these revisions, the death of Sita leads Rama to drown himself. Through death, he joins her in afterlife. Depiction of Rama dying by drowning himself and then emerging in the sky as a six-armed incarnate of Vishnu is found in the Burmese version of Rama's life story called Thiri Rama.

=== Variations ===
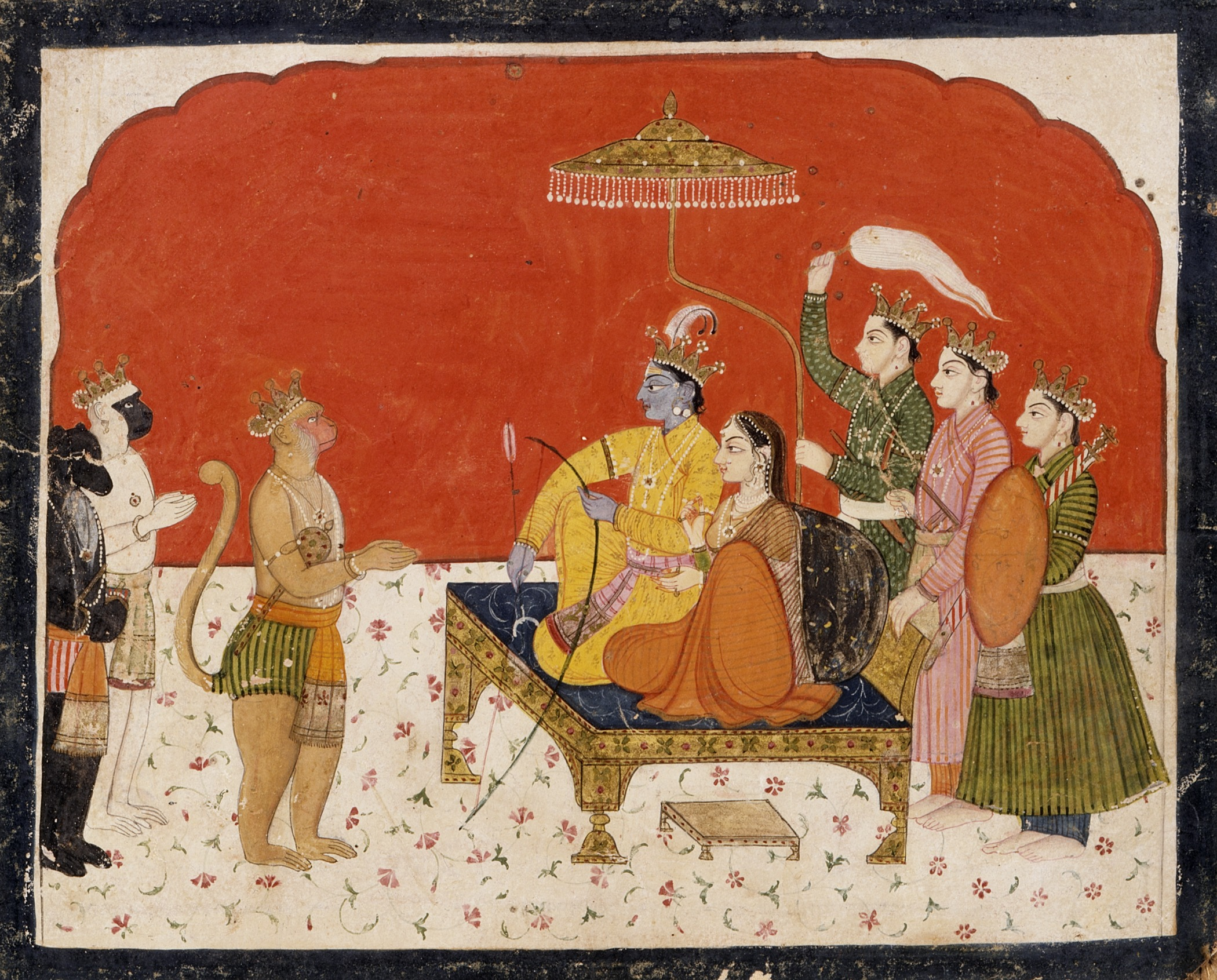
Rama darbar (Rama's court), Chamba painting, 1775–1800. Rama and Sita on the throne with Rama's brothers behind. Hanuman with Sugriva and Jambavan pay their respects.

Rama's legends vary significantly by the region and across manuscripts. While there is a common foundation, plot, grammar and an essential core of values associated with a battle between good and evil, there is neither a correct version nor a single verifiable ancient one. According to Paula Richman, there are hundreds of versions of "the story of Rama in India, Southeast Asia and beyond". The versions vary by region reflecting local preoccupations and histories, and these cannot be called "divergences or different tellings" from the "real" version, rather all the versions of Rama story are real and true in their own meanings to the local cultural tradition, according to scholars such as Richman and Ramanujan.

The stories vary in details, particularly where the moral question is clear, but the appropriate ethical response is unclear or disputed. For example, when demoness Shurpanakha disguises as a woman to seduce Rama, then stalks and harasses Rama's wife Sita after Rama refuses her, Lakshmana is faced with the question of appropriate ethical response. In the Indian tradition, states Richman, the social value is that "a warrior must never harm a woman". The details of the response by Rama and Lakshmana, and justifications for it, has numerous versions. Similarly, there are numerous and very different versions to how Rama deals with rumours against Sita when they return victorious to Ayodhya, given that the rumours can neither be objectively investigated nor summarily ignored. Similarly the versions vary on many other specific situations and closure such as how Rama, Sita and Lakshmana die.

The variation and inconsistencies are not limited to the texts found in the Hinduism traditions. The Rama story in the Jain tradition also show variation by author and region, in details, in implied ethical prescriptions and even in names – the older versions using the name Padma instead of Rama, while the later Jain texts just use Rama.

== Dating and historicity ==
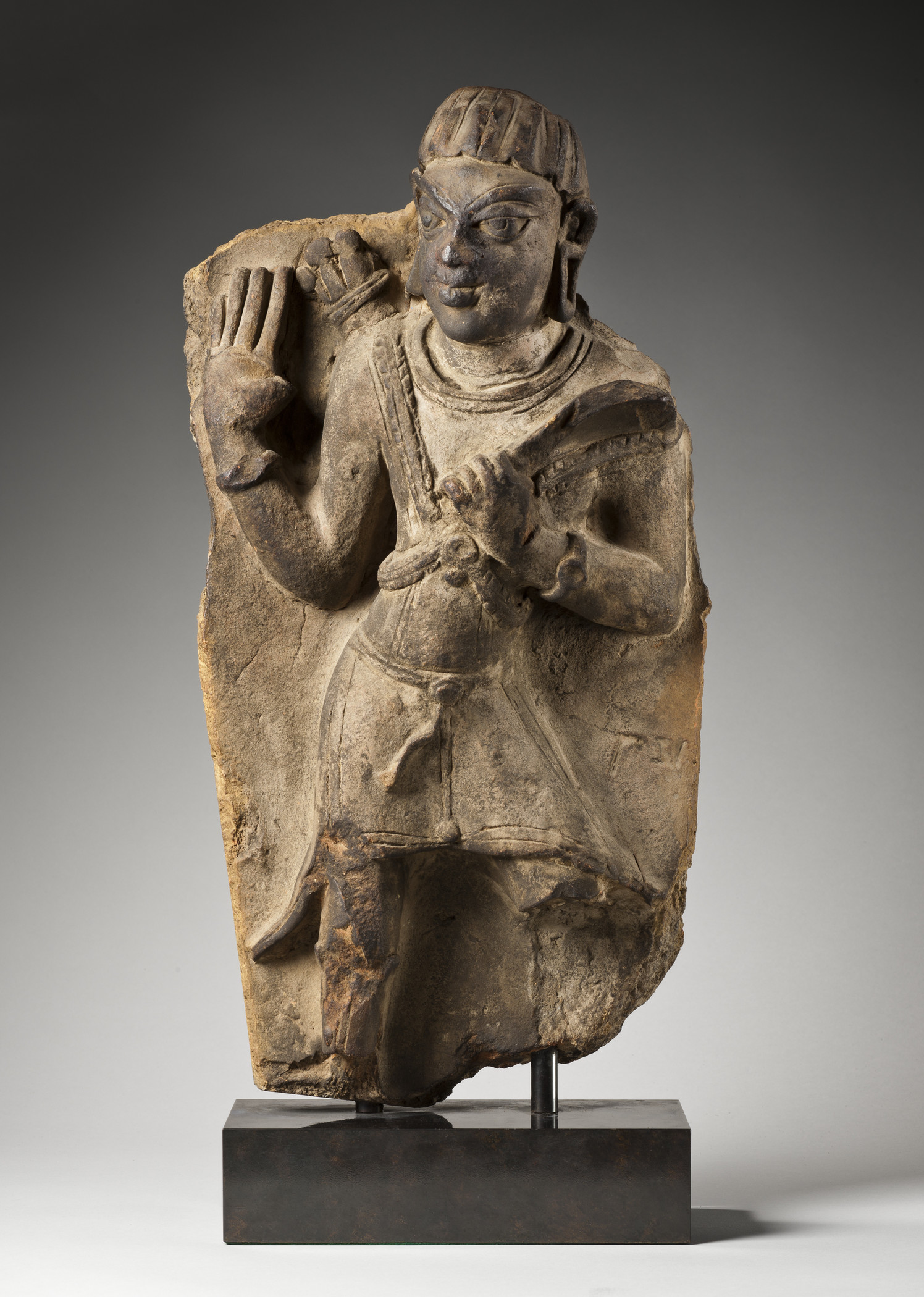
A 4th-century-CE terracotta sculpture depicting Rama

In some Hindu texts, Rama is stated to have lived in the Treta Yuga that their authors estimate existed before about 5000 BCE. Archaeologist H. D. Sankalia, who specialised in Proto- and Ancient Indian history, find such estimate to be "pure speculation". Sankalia states that incidents of the Ramayana story could have taken place between 1,500-700 BCE.

The composition of Rama's epic story, the Ramayana, in its current form is usually dated between 8th and 4th century BCE. According to John Brockington, a professor of Sanskrit at Oxford known for his publications on the Ramayana, the original text was likely composed and transmitted orally in more ancient times, and modern scholars have suggested various centuries in the 1st millennium BCE. In Brockington's view, "based on the language, style and content of the work, a date of roughly the fifth century BCE is the most reasonable estimate".

Historians often highlight that Rama's narrative reflects not only religious beliefs but also societal ideals and moral principles. They explore the possibility of Rama being a composite figure, embodying virtues and qualities valued in ancient Indian society. This perspective underscores the Ramayana's role as both a religious scripture and a cultural artifact, illustrating how legends like Rama's have shaped India's collective consciousness and ethical frameworks over centuries. Ariel Glucklich about this, quoted: "[...] Rama serve not only as historical narratives but also as moral and spiritual teachings, shaping cultural identity and religious beliefs in profound ways."

== Iconography and characteristics ==
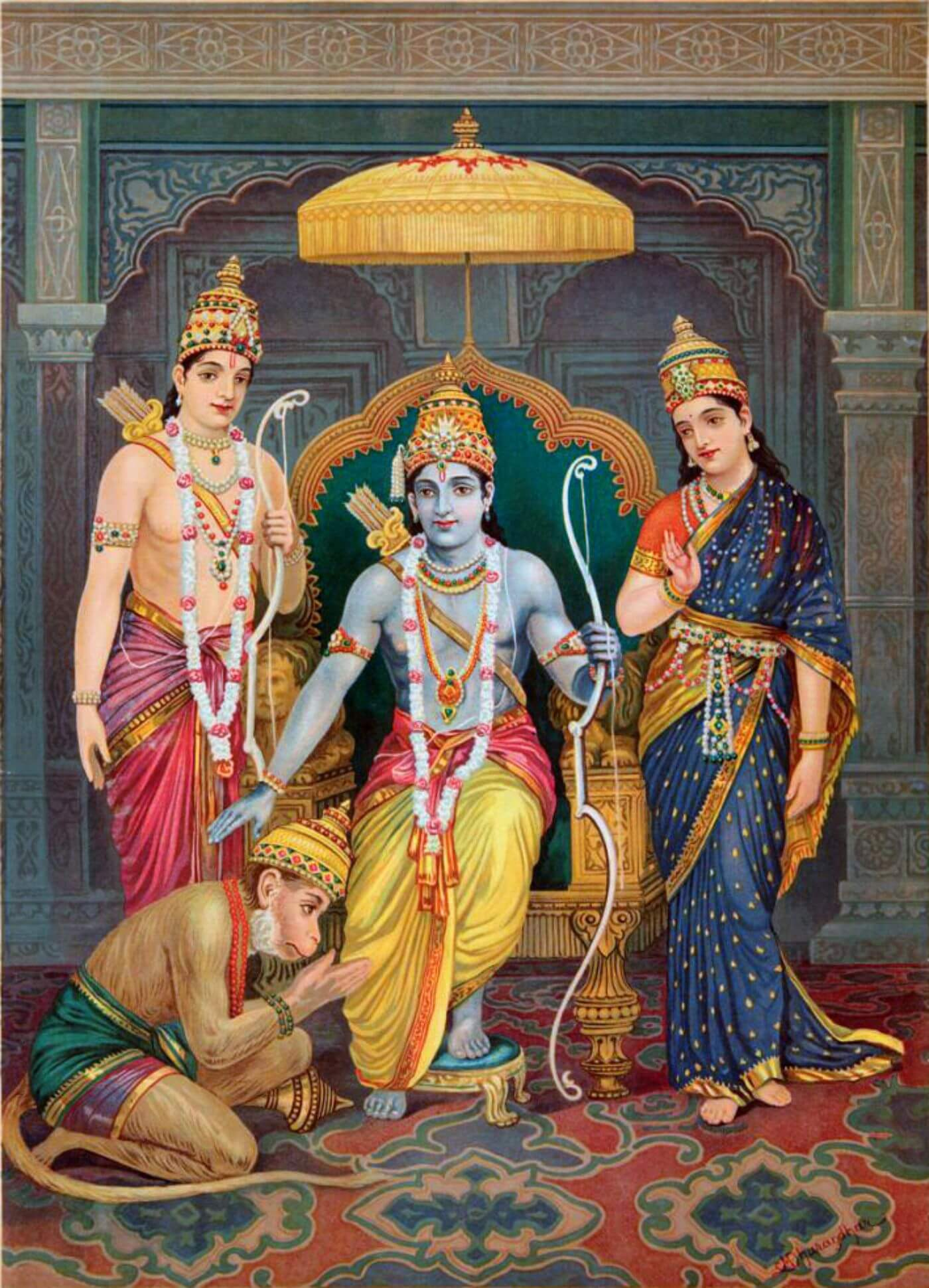
Sree Raghunandan - Rama with Lakshmana (left), Sita (right) and Hanuman (bottom left), M V Dhurandar (1867- 1944).

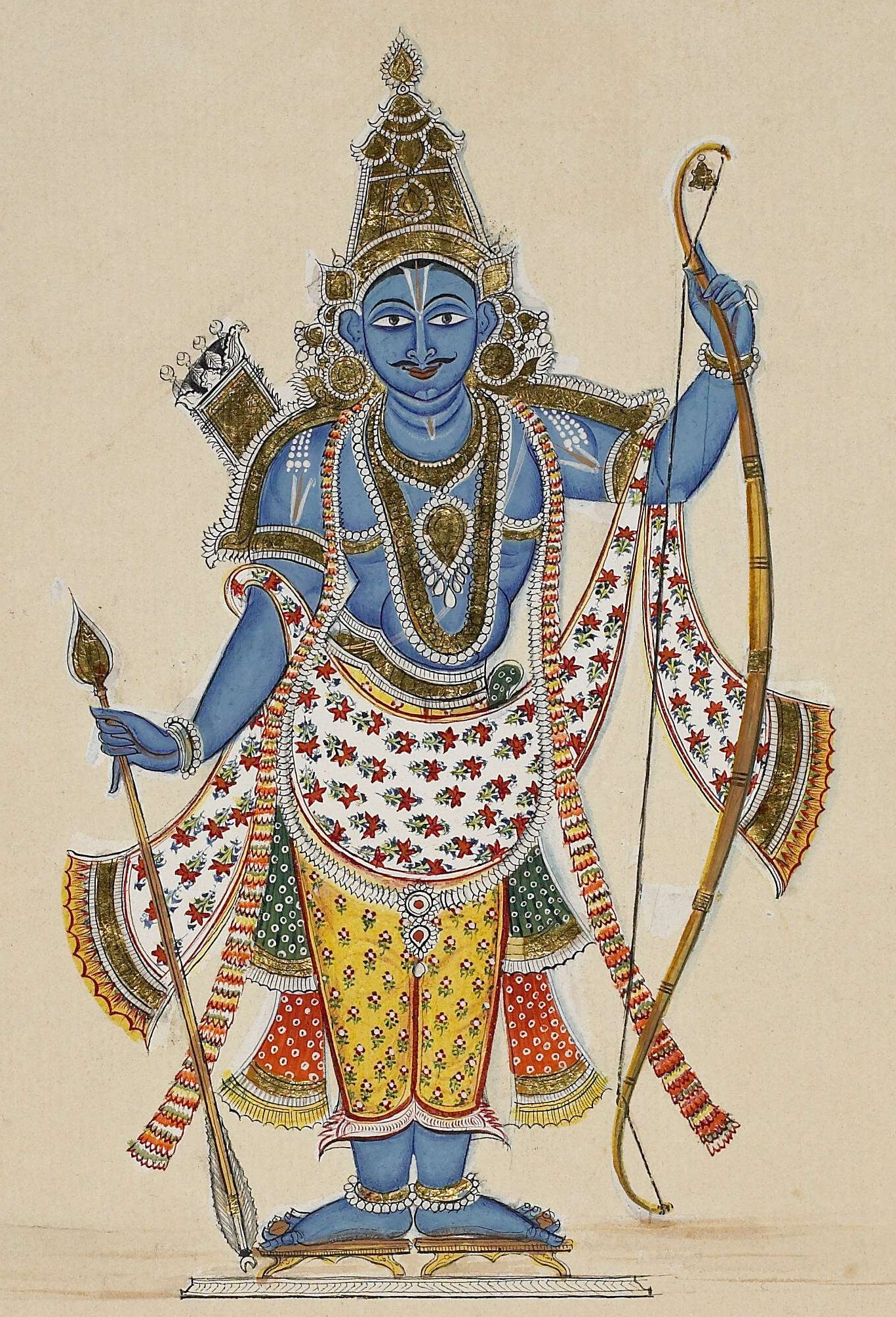
Rama in a tribhanga pose, 19th-century depiction

Rama iconography shares elements of avatars of Vishnu, but has several distinctive elements. He has two hands, holds a bana (arrow) in his right hand, while he holds the dhanus (bow) in his left. He is often accompanied with his brother Lakshmana on his left side while his consort Sita always on his right, both of golden-yellow complexion. His monkey companion Hanuman stands nearby with folded arms. He is shown black, blue or dark color, typically wearing reddish color clothes. The group can be accompanied with Rama's brothers Bharata and Shatrughna too.

Rama sculptures depict several postures, such as standing in tribhanga pose (thrice bent "S" shape). Rama is also depicted in Abhanga posture carrying a bow and arrow, such as in classical dance literature, while many south indian temples depict Rama in dvibangha posture, such as Sri Rama at Chennakesava temple in Markapuram, Prakasam district of Andhra Pradesh, where Sri Rama stands in dvibangha and holds arrow in the right hand and bow in the left. While some scholars claim that tribhanga may be a preferred posture for Rama sculptures, other scholars contradict this, as evidenced by many Rama idols in dvibhanga posture consecrated as temple deities in many respected temples, including that Rama sculpture at the Bhimesvara temple at Drakshara, Chennakesava Temple, Markapuram, where Rama stands in dvibhaṅga, holding an arrow in the right hand and bow in the left, and Chennakesava group of temples, Pushpagiri, where a Ramayana panel depicts Rama standing in dvibhaṅga, holding bow and arrow

The Ramayana describes Rama as a charming, well built person of a dark complexion (varṇam śyāmam) and long arms (ājānabāhu, meaning a person whose middle finger reaches beyond their knee). In the Sundara Kanda section of the epic, Hanuman describes Rama to Sita when she is held captive in Lanka, to prove to her that he is indeed a messenger from Rama. He says:

He has broad shoulders, mighty arms, a conch-shaped neck, a charming countenance, and coppery eyes;

he has his clavicle concealed and is known by the people as Rama. He has a voice (deep) like the sound of a kettledrum and glossy skin,

is full of glory, square-built, and of well-proportioned limbs and is endowed with a dark-brown complexion.

== Philosophy and symbolism ==
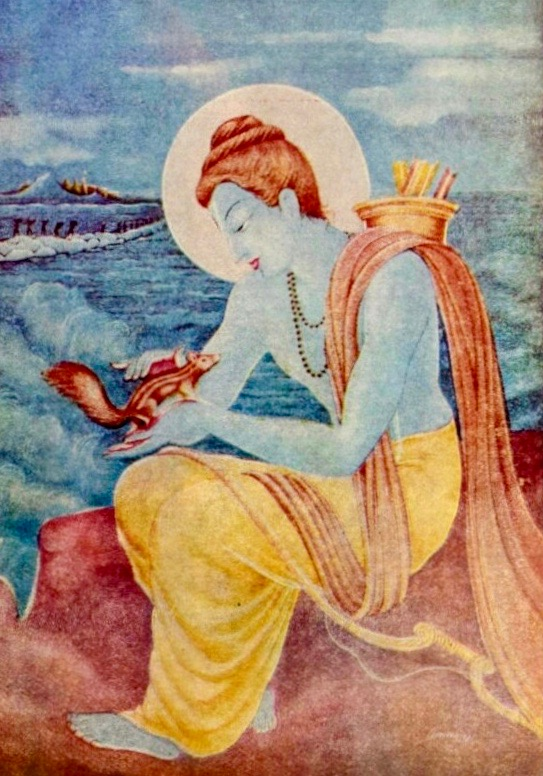
Rama is portrayed in Hindu arts and texts as a compassionate person who cares for all living beings.

Rama's life story is imbued with symbolism. According to Sheldon Pollock, the life of Rama as told in the Indian texts is a masterpiece that offers a framework to represent, conceptualise and comprehend the world and the nature of life. Like major epics and religious stories around the world, it has been of vital relevance because it "tells the culture what it is". Rama's life is more complex than the Western template for the battle between the good and the evil, where there is a clear distinction between immortal powerful gods or heroes and mortal struggling humans. In the Indian traditions, particularly Rama, the story is about a divine human, a mortal god, incorporating both into the exemplar who transcends both humans and gods.

Responding to evil

A superior being does not render evil for evil,
this is the maxim one should observe;
the ornament of virtuous persons is their conduct.
(...)
A noble soul will ever exercise compassion
even towards those who enjoy injuring others.

— Ramayana 6.115, Valmiki
(Abridged, Translator: Roderick Hindery)

As a person, Rama personifies the characteristics of an ideal person (purushottama). He had within him all the desirable virtues that any individual would seek to aspire, and he fulfils all his moral obligations. Rama is considered a maryada purushottama or the best of upholders of Dharma.

According to Rodrick Hindery, Book 2, 6 and 7 are notable for ethical studies. The views of Rama combine "reason with emotions" to create a "thinking hearts" approach. Second, he emphasises through what he says and what he does a union of "self-consciousness and action" to create an "ethics of character". Third, Rama's life combines the ethics with the aesthetics of living. The story of Rama and people in his life raises questions such as "is it appropriate to use evil to respond to evil?", and then provides a spectrum of views within the framework of Indian beliefs such as on karma and dharma.

Rama's life and comments emphasise that one must pursue and live life fully, that all three life aims are equally important: virtue (dharma), desires (kama), and legitimate acquisition of wealth (artha). Rama also adds, such as in section 4.38 of the Ramayana, that one must also introspect and never neglect what one's proper duties, appropriate responsibilities, true interests, and legitimate pleasures are.

== Literary sources ==
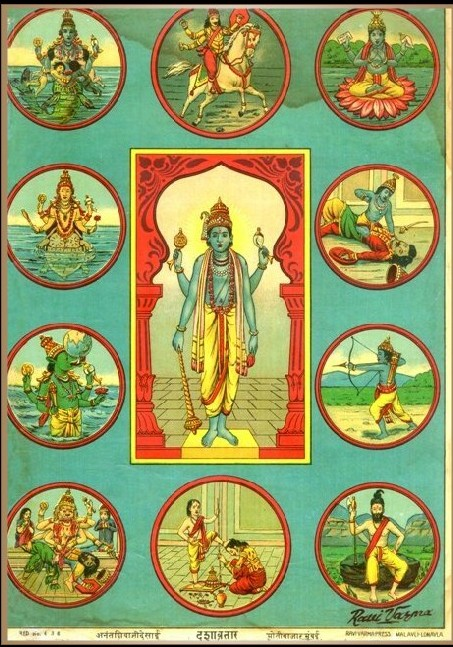
Rama (right third from top) depicted in the Dashavatara (ten incarnations) of Vishnu. Painting by Raja Ravi Varma.

=== Ramayana ===
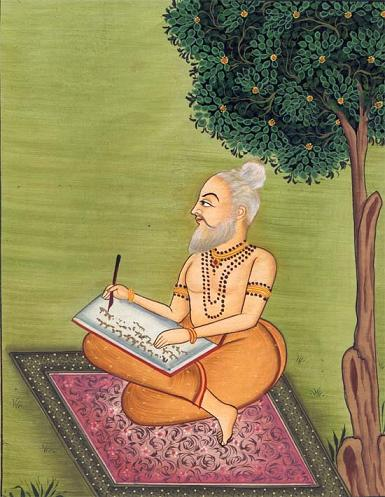
Valmiki composing the Ramayana

The primary source of the life of Rama is the Sanskrit epic Ramayana composed by Rishi Valmiki. The epic had many versions across India's regions. The followers of Madhvacharya believe that an older version of the Ramayana, the Mula-Ramayana, previously existed. The Madhva tradition considers it to have been more authoritative than the version by Valmiki.

Versions of the Ramayana exist in most major Indian languages; examples that elaborate on the life, deeds and divine philosophies of Rama include the epic poem Ramavataram, and the following vernacular versions of Rama's life story:

- Ramavataram or Kamba-Ramayanam in Tamil by the poet Kambar. (12th century)
- Saptakanda Ramayana in Assamese by poet Madhava Kandali. (14th century)
- Krittivasi Ramayana in Bengali by poet Krittibas Ojha. (15th century)
- Ramcharitmanas in Awadhi by sant Tulsidas. (16th century)
- Pampa Ramayana, Torave Ramayana by Kumara Valmiki and Sri Ramayana Darshanam by Kuvempu in Kannada
- Bhavartha Ramayana in Marathi by Sant Eknath. (16th century)
- Ranganatha Ramayanam (c. 1300) by Ranganatha, and Ramayana Kalpavruksham by Viswanatha Satyanarayana in Telugu
- Vilanka Ramayana in Odia
- Adhyatma Ramayanam Kilippattu in Malayalam by Ezhuttachan (this text is closer to the Advaita Vedanta-inspired rendition Adhyatma Ramayana). (16th century)

The epic is found across India, in different languages and cultural traditions.

=== In Tamil literature ===
There are several references of the Ramayana in early Tamil literature even before the Ramavataram (Kamba Ramayanam), which seems to indicate that the story of the text was familiar in the Tamil lands even before the 12th century. Tamil Sangam texts like the Akananuru, Purananuru, and the Kalittokai mention scenes of the Ramayana and figures such as Rama, Sita, the ten-faced demon (Ravana), and monkeys. The Tamil epic Cilappatikaram also mentions Rama as the avatar of Vishnu, who measured the three worlds and destroyed the city of Lanka.

=== Adhyatma Ramayana ===
Adhyatma Ramayana is a late medieval Sanskrit text extolling the spiritualism in the story of Ramayana. It is embedded in the latter portion of Brahmānda Purana, and constitutes about a third of it. The text philosophically attempts to reconcile Bhakti in god Rama and Shaktism with Advaita Vedanta, over 65 chapters and 4,500 verses.

The text represents Rama as the Brahman (metaphysical reality), mapping all attributes and aspects of Rama to abstract virtues and spiritual ideals. Adhyatma Ramayana transposes Ramayana into symbolism of self study of one's own soul, with metaphors described in Advaita terminology. It influenced the popular Ramcharitmanas by Tulsidas, and inspired the most popular version of Nepali Ramayana by Bhanubhakta Acharya. This was also translated by Thunchath Ezhuthachan to Malayalam, which lead the foundation of Malayalam literature itself.

=== Ramacharitmanas ===
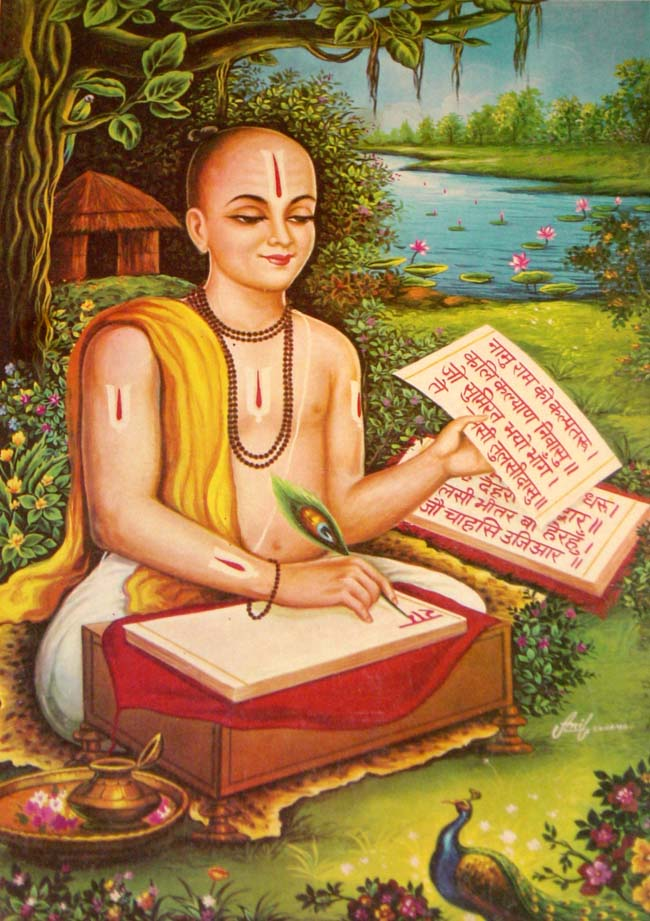
Tulsidas hints at several places in his works, that he had met face to face with Hanuman and Rama. The detailed account of his meetings with Hanuman and Rama are given in the Bhaktirasbodhini of Priyadas.

The Ramayana is a Sanskrit text, while Ramacharitamanasa retells the Ramayana in Awadhi, commonly understood in northern India by speakers of the several Hindi languages. Ramacharitamanasa was composed in the 16th century by Tulsidas. The popular text is notable for synthesising the epic story in a Bhakti movement framework, wherein the original legends and ideas morph in an expression of spiritual bhakti (devotional love) for a personal god. (Note: For example, like other Hindu poet-saints of the Bhakti movement before the 16th century, Tulsidas in Ramcharitmanas recommends the simplest path to devotion is Nam-simran (absorb oneself in remembering the divine name "Rama"). He suggests either vocally repeating the name (jap) or silent repetition in mind (ajapajap). This concept of Rama moves beyond the divinised hero and connotes an "all-pervading Being" and equivalent to atmarama within. The term atmarama is a compound of "Atma" and "Rama", it literally means "he who finds joy in his own self", according to the French Indologist Charlotte Vaudeville known for her studies on Ramayana and Bhakti movement.)

Tulsidas was inspired by Adhyatma Ramayana, where Rama and other figures of the Valmiki Ramayana along with their attributes (saguna narrative) were transposed into spiritual terms and abstract rendering of an Atma (soul, self, Brahman) without attributes (nirguna reality). According to Kapoor, Rama's life story in the Ramacharitamanasa combines mythology, philosophy, and religious beliefs into a story of life, a code of ethics, a treatise on universal human values. It debates in its dialogues the human dilemmas, the ideal standards of behaviour, duties to those one loves, and mutual responsibilities. It inspires the audience to view their own lives from a spiritual plane, encouraging the virtuous to keep going, and comforting those oppressed with a healing balm.

The Ramacharitmanas is notable for being the Rama-based play commonly performed every year in autumn, during the weeklong performance arts festival of Ramlila. The "staging of the Ramayana based on the Ramacharitmanas" was inscribed in 2008 by UNESCO as one of the Intangible Cultural Heritages of Humanity.

=== Yoga Vasistha ===
Human effort can be used for self-betterment and that there is no such thing as an external fate imposed by the gods.

— Yoga Vasistha (Vasistha teaching Rama)
Tr: Christopher Chapple

Yoga Vasistha is a Sanskrit text structured as a conversation between young Prince Rama and sage Vasistha who was called as the first sage of the Vedanta school of Hindu philosophy by Adi Shankara. The complete text contains over 29,000 verses. The short version of the text is called Laghu Yogavasistha and contains 6,000 verses. The exact century of its completion is unknown, but has been estimated to be somewhere between the 6th century CE to as late as the 14th century CE, but it is likely that a version of the text existed in the 1st millennium CE.

The Yoga Vasistha text consists of six books. The first book presents Rama's frustration with the nature of life, human suffering and disdain for the world. The second describes, through the figure of Rama, the desire for liberation and the nature of those who seek such liberation. The third and fourth books assert that liberation comes through a spiritual life, one that requires self-effort, and present cosmology and metaphysical theories of existence embedded in stories. These two books are known for emphasising free will and human creative power. The fifth book discusses meditation and its powers in liberating the individual, while the last book describes the state of an enlightened and blissful Rama.

Yoga Vasistha is considered one of the most important texts of the Vedantic philosophy. The text, states David Gordon White, served as a reference on Yoga for medieval era Advaita Vedanta scholars. The Yoga Vasistha, according to White, was one of the popular texts on Yoga that dominated the Indian Yoga culture scene before the 12th century.

=== Upanishad ===
Rama is the central character in three of the fourteen Vaishnava Upanishads – Rama Rahasya Upanishad, Rama Tapaniya Upanishad and Tarasara Upanishad.

Rama Rahasya Upanishad talks about is largely recited by Hanuman, who states that Rama is identical to the supreme unchanging reality Brahman, same as major Hindu deities, and the means to satcitananda and liberation. The text also includes sections on Tantra suggesting the Bīja mantra based on Rama. The Rama Tapaniya Upanishad, emphasis is on the Rama mantra Rama Ramaya namaha. It presents him as equivalent to the Atman (soul, self) and the Brahman (Ultimate Reality). Tarasara Upanishad describes Rama as Paramatman, Narayana and supreme Purusha (cosmic man), the ancient Purushottama, the eternal, the liberated, the true, the highest bliss, the one without a second.

=== Other major texts ===
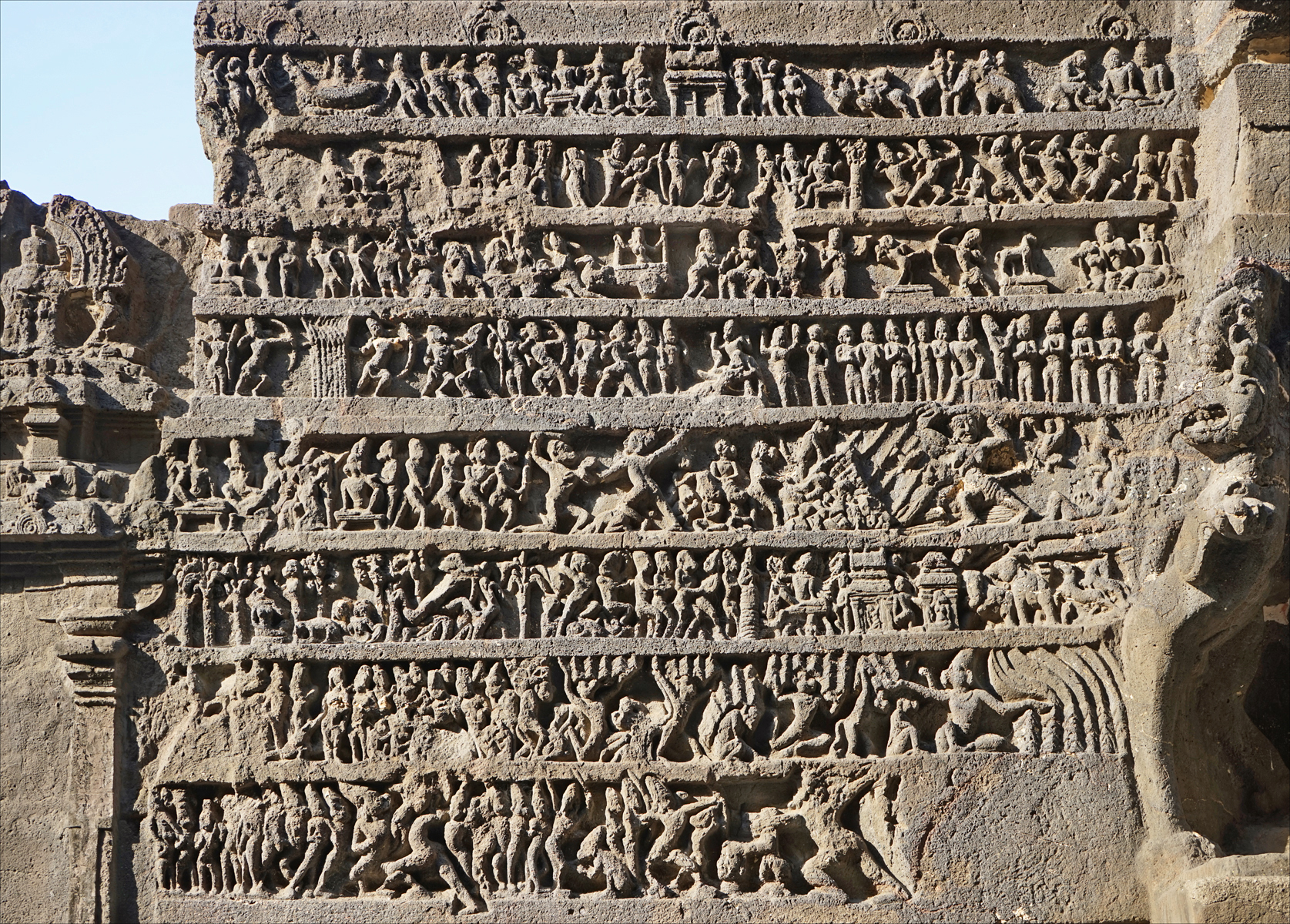
The Rama story is carved into stone as an 8th-century relief artwork in the largest Shiva temple of the Ellora Caves, suggesting its importance to the Indian society by then.

Other important historic Hindu texts on Rama include Bhusundi Ramanaya, Prasanna Raghava, and Ramavali by Tulsidas. The Sanskrit poem Bhaṭṭikāvya of Bhatti, who lived in Gujarat in the seventh century CE, is a retelling of the epic that simultaneously illustrates the grammatical examples for Pāṇini's Aṣṭādhyāyī as well as the major figures of speech and the Prakrit language. Another historically and chronologically important text is Raghuvamsa authored by Kalidasa. Its story confirms many details of the Ramayana, but has novel and different elements. It mentions that Ayodhya was not the capital in the time of Rama's son named Kusha, but that he later returned to it and made it the capital again. This text is notable because the poetry in the text is exquisite and called a Mahakavya in the Indian tradition, and has attracted many scholarly commentaries. It is also significant because Kalidasa has been dated to between the 4th and 5th century CE, suggesting that the Ramayana legend was well established by the time of Kalidasa.

The Mahabharata has a summary of the Ramayana. The Jainism tradition has extensive literature of Rama as well, but generally refers to him as Padma, such as in the Paumacariya by Vimalasuri. Rama and Sita legend is mentioned in the Jataka tales of Buddhism, as Dasaratha-Jataka (Tale no. 461), but with slightly different spellings such as Lakkhana for Lakshmana and Rama-pandita for Rama.

Rama appears in the Puranas namely the Vishnu Purana and Padma Purana (as an avatar of Vishnu), the Matsya Purana (as form of Bhagavan), the Linga Purana (as form of Vishnu), the Kurma Purana,Agni Purana, Garuda Purana (as Rama), the Skanda Purana and the Shiva Purana. Additionally, the Rama story is included in the Vana Parva of the Mahabharata, which has been a part of evidence that the Ramayana is likely more ancient, and it was summarised in the Mahabharata epic in ancient times.

Rama and Sita appears as the central character in Valmiki Samhita, which is attributed to their worship and describes them to be the ultimate reality. Apart from other versions of Ramayana, many 14th-century Vaishnava saints such as Nabha Dass, Tulsidas and Ramananda have their works written about Rama's life. While Ramananda's Sri Ramarchan Paddati explains the complete procedure to worship Sita-Rama, Tulsidas's Vinaya Patrika has devotional hymns dedicated to Rama including Shri Ramachandra Kripalu. Ramananda through his conversation with disciple Surasurananda in Vaishnava Matabja Bhaskara, explains about the worship of Rama, Sita and Lakshmana, and answers the 10 most prominent questions related to Vaishnavism. Vedanta Desika's Hamsa-Sandesha, is a love poem which describes Rama sending message to Sita through a swan.

== Worship and festivals ==
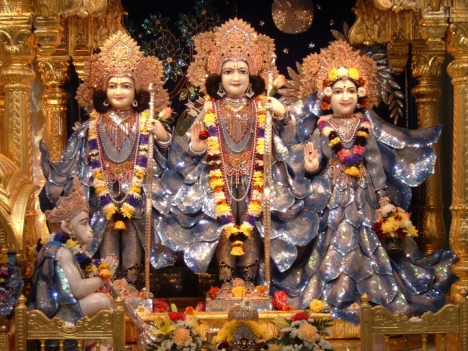
Idols of Sita (far right), Rama (center), Lakshmana (far left) and Hanuman (below, seated) at Bhaktivedanta Manor, Watford, England

As part of the Bhakti movement, Rama became focus of the Ramanandi Sampradaya, a sannyasi community founded by the 14th-century North-Indian poet-saint Ramananda. This community has grown to become the largest Hindu monastic community in modern times. This Rama-inspired movement has championed social reforms, accepting members without discriminating anyone by gender, class, caste or religion since the time of Ramananda who also accepted Muslims wishing to leave Islam. Traditional scholarship holds that his disciples included later Bhakti movement poet-saints such as Kabir, Ravidas, Bhagat Pipa and others. Ram is also the supreme god in the Niranjani Sampradaya, that primarily worships Rama and Sita. The sampradaya was founded by the 16th-century North-Indian poet-saint Haridas Niranjani.

Vyasa represents Rama as the Brahman (metaphysical reality), mapping all saguna (attributes) of Rama to the nirguna nature (ultimate unchanging attributeless virtues and ideals, in the Adhyatma Ramayana). The text raises every mundane activity of Rama to a spiritual or transcendent level, the story into symbolism, thus instructing the seeker to view his or her own life through the symbolic vision for his soul, where the external life is but a metaphor for the eternal journey of the soul in Advaita terminology.

=== Hymns ===
Śrī Rāma Jaya Rāma Jaya Jaya Rāma (Sanskrit: श्री राम जय राम जय जय राम)

— Chant of Mahatma Gandhi containing thirteen syllables. It is known as Śrī Rāma Tāraka mantra (lit. 'The Rama mantra for Salvation').

In the phalaśruti (lit. 'The benefit of hearing') of the Vishnu Sahasranama, there is a famous concluding verse, where Lord Siva says to his consort Parvati:

Original Devanagari

ईश्वर उवाच:
श्री राम राम रामेति रमे रामे मनोरमे ।
सहस्रनाम तत् तुल्यं राम नाम वरानने ॥

IAST

īśvara uvāca:
Śrī Rāma Rāma Rāmeti Rame Rāme Manorame
Sahasranāma Tattulyam Rāma Nāma Varānane

English translation

Thus spake Shiva:
O beautiful-faced one (Goddess Parvati), I constantly delight in chanting the name of 'Rama, Rama, Rama'. The chanting of this single name of Sri Rama is equal to reciting the entire thousand names of Lord Vishnu.

In Hindu theology, a Tāraka mantra is likened to a boat that helps the chanter cross the vast ocean of Samsara (the continuous cycle of birth, death, and rebirth), leading directly to Moksha (salvation). The word Tāraka comes from the Sanskrit root tṛ, which means "to cross over." Because chanting Rama's name provides this liberation, He is worshipped by Hindus as Tāraka Rāma (lit. 'Salvator Rama'). Some well-known devotees of Rama such as Valmiki, Tulsidas, Bhadrachala Ramadasu, Samartha Ramadas, Tyagaraja, Purandara Dasa and Gondavalekar Maharaj popularized this mantra. In Hindu tradition, specifically described in Valmiki’s Ramayana) and Tulsidas's Ramcharitmanas, Rāma Rājya (lit. 'Rama's Kingdom') is the ultimate benchmark for governance.

List of prayers and hymns dedicated to Rama are:

- Jai Shri Ram – Greeting or Salutation in North India dedicated to Rama.
- Jai Siya Ram – Greeting or Salutation in North India dedicated to Sita and Rama.
- Siyavar Ramchandraji Ki Jai – Greeting or Salutation dedicated to Sita and Rama. The hymns introduces Rama as Sita's husband.
- Sita-Ram-Sita-Ram – The maha-mantra is as follows:

सीता राम सीता राम सीता राम जय सीता राम। सीता राम सीता राम सीता राम जय सीता राम।।

- Hare Rama Rama Rama, Sita Rama Rama Rama.
- Ramashatanamastotra – The hymn dedicated to Rama, which contains 108 names of Rama, mentioned in the Yaga Kanda of Ananda Ramayana.
- Ramastotram – The hymn dedicated to Rama, mentioned in the Vilasa Kanda of Ananda Ramayana.
- Ramaraksha Mahamantra – The hymn dedicated to Rama, mentioned in the Janma Kanda of Ananda Ramayana.
- Ramasahasranamastotra – The hymn dedicated to Rama, mentioned in the Rajya Kanda of Ananda Ramayana.
- Rama Kavacha – The hymn dedicated to Rama, mentioned in the Manohar Kanda of Ananda Ramayana.
- Vinaya Patrika – The devotional poem has prayers dedicated to Rama, including Shri Ramachandra Kripalu, which is as follows:

श्री रामचन्द्र कृपालु भजुमन हरण भवभय दारुणं । नव कञ्ज लोचन कञ्ज मुख कर कञ्ज पद कञ्जारुणं ॥

- Janaki Mangal – This verse describes the episode of Sita and Rama's marriage and has hymns and prayers dedicated to them.
- Thumak Chalat Ram Chandra – This devotional song describes the beauty of Rama's face during his childhood.
- Hare Rama Hare Krishna – This hymn is dedicated to both Rama and Krishna, and is as follows:

Hare Rama Hare Rama
Rama Rama Hare Hare
Hare Krishna Hare Krishna
Krishna Krishna Hare Hare

— Kali-Santarana Upanisad.

=== Festivals ===
==== Rama Navami ====
Rama Navami is a spring festival that celebrates the birthday of Rama. The festival is a part of the spring Navratri, and falls on the ninth day of the bright half of Chaitra month in the traditional Hindu calendar. This typically occurs in the Gregorian months of March or April every year.

The day is marked by recital of Rama legends in temples, or reading of Rama stories at home. Some Vaishnava Hindus visit a temple, others pray within their home, and some participate in a bhajan or kirtan with music as a part of puja and aarti. The community organises charitable events and volunteer meals. The festival is an occasion for moral reflection for many Hindus. Some mark this day by vrata (fasting) or a visit to a river for a dip.

The important celebrations on this day take place at Ayodhya, Sitamarhi, Janakpur (Nepal), Bhadrachalam, Kodandarama Temple, Vontimitta and Rameswaram. Rathayatras, the chariot processions, also known as Shobha yatras of Rama, Sita, his brother Lakshmana and Hanuman, are taken out at several places. In Ayodhya, many take a dip in the sacred river Sarayu and then visit the Rama temple.

Rama Navami day also marks the end of the nine-day spring festival celebrated in Karnataka and Andhra Pradesh called Vasanthothsavam (Festival of Spring), that starts with Ugadi. Some highlights of this day are Kalyanam (ceremonial wedding performed by temple priests) at Bhadrachalam on the banks of the river Godavari in Bhadradri Kothagudem district of Telangana, preparing and sharing Panakam which is a sweet drink prepared with jaggery and pepper, a procession and Rama temple decorations.

==== Ramlila and Dussehra ====
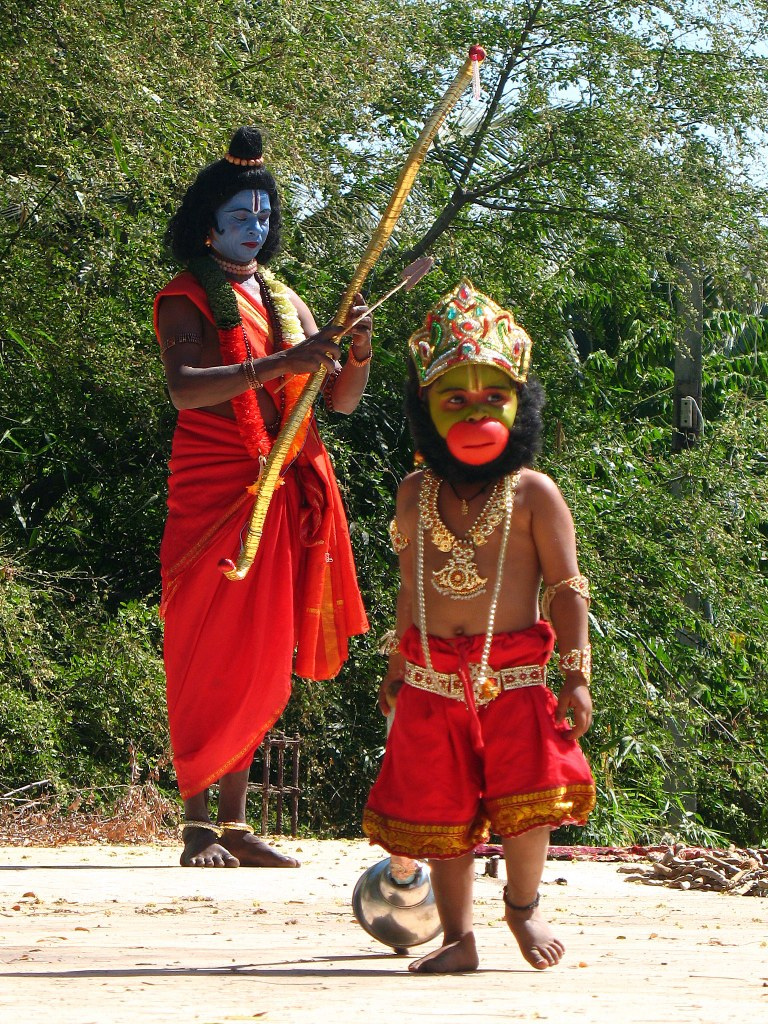
In Northern, Central and Western states of India, the Ramlila play is enacted during Navratri by rural artists (above).

Rama's life is remembered and celebrated every year with dramatic plays and fireworks in autumn. This is called Ramlila, and the play follows the Ramayana or more commonly the Ramcharitmanas. It is observed through thousands of Rama-related performance arts and dance events, that are staged during the festival of Navratri in India. After the enactment of the legendary war between Good and Evil, the Ramlila celebrations climax in the Dussehra (Dasara, Vijayadashami) night festivities where the giant grotesque effigies of Evil such as of demon Ravana are burnt, typically with fireworks.

The Ramlila festivities were declared by UNESCO as one of the "Intangible Cultural Heritages of Humanity" in 2008. Ramlila is particularly notable in historically important Hindu cities of Ayodhya, Varanasi, Vrindavan, Almora, Satna and Madhubani – cities in Uttar Pradesh, Uttarakhand, Bihar and Madhya Pradesh. The epic and its dramatic play migrated into southeast Asia in the 1st millennium CE, and Ramayana based Ramlila is a part of performance arts culture of Indonesia, particularly the Hindu society of Bali, Myanmar, Cambodia and Thailand.

==== Diwali ====
In many parts of India and South-east Asia, Rama's return to Ayodhya and his coronation are the main reasons for celebrating Diwali, also known as the Festival of Lights, with celebrations marked with sweets, candles and fireworks. Diwali symbolises the victory of Dharma over Adharma and good over evil, which often refers to Rama's righteous victory over the demon king, Ravana. Diwali is celebrated during the Hindu lunisolar months of Ashvin (according to the amanta tradition) and Kārtika – between around mid-October and mid-November. Several Diwali legends are also connected to other Hindu deities, including Vishnu, Krishna, Dhanvantari, and Vishvakarman.

In Guyana, Diwali is marked as a special occasion and celebrated with a lot of fanfare. It is observed as a national holiday in this part of the world and some ministers of the Government also take part in the celebrations publicly. Just like Vijayadashmi, Diwali is celebrated by different communities across India to commemorate different events in addition to Rama's return to Ayodhya. For example, many communities celebrate one day of Diwali to celebrate the Victory of Krishna over the demon Narakasur. (Note: As per another popular tradition, in the Dvapara Yuga period, Krishna, an avatar of Vishnu, killed the demon Narakasura, who was the evil king of Pragjyotishapura, near present-day Assam and released 16000 girls held captive by Narakasura. Diwali was celebrated as a sign of the triumph of good over evil after Krishna's Victory over Narakasura. The day before Diwali is remembered as Naraka Chaturdasi, the day on which Narakasura was killed by Krishna.)

==== Vasanthotsavam ====
Vasanthotsavam is an annual Seva celebrated in Tirumala to celebrate the arrival of spring season. Abhishekam - specifically called Snapana Thirumanjanam (Holy bathing), is performed to the utsava murthy and his consorts on all the three days. On the third day, abhishekam is performed to the idols of Rama, Sita, Lakshmana and Hanumana along with Krishna and Rukmini. Procession of the consecrated idols are taken in a procession in the evening on all the three days.

== Temples ==
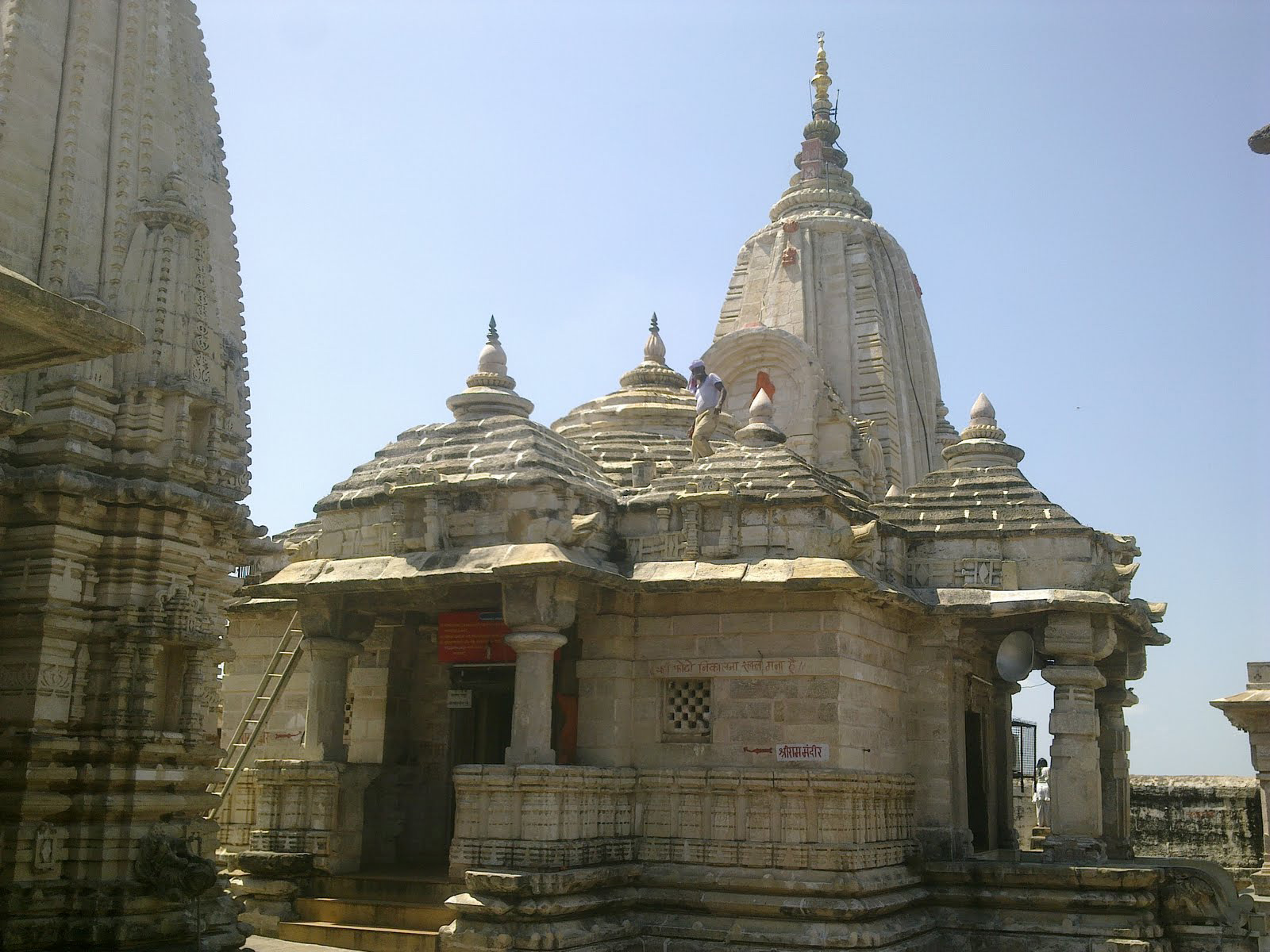
Rama Temple at Ramtek (10th century, restored). A medieval inscription here calls Rama as Advaitavadaprabhu or "Lord of the Advaita doctrine".

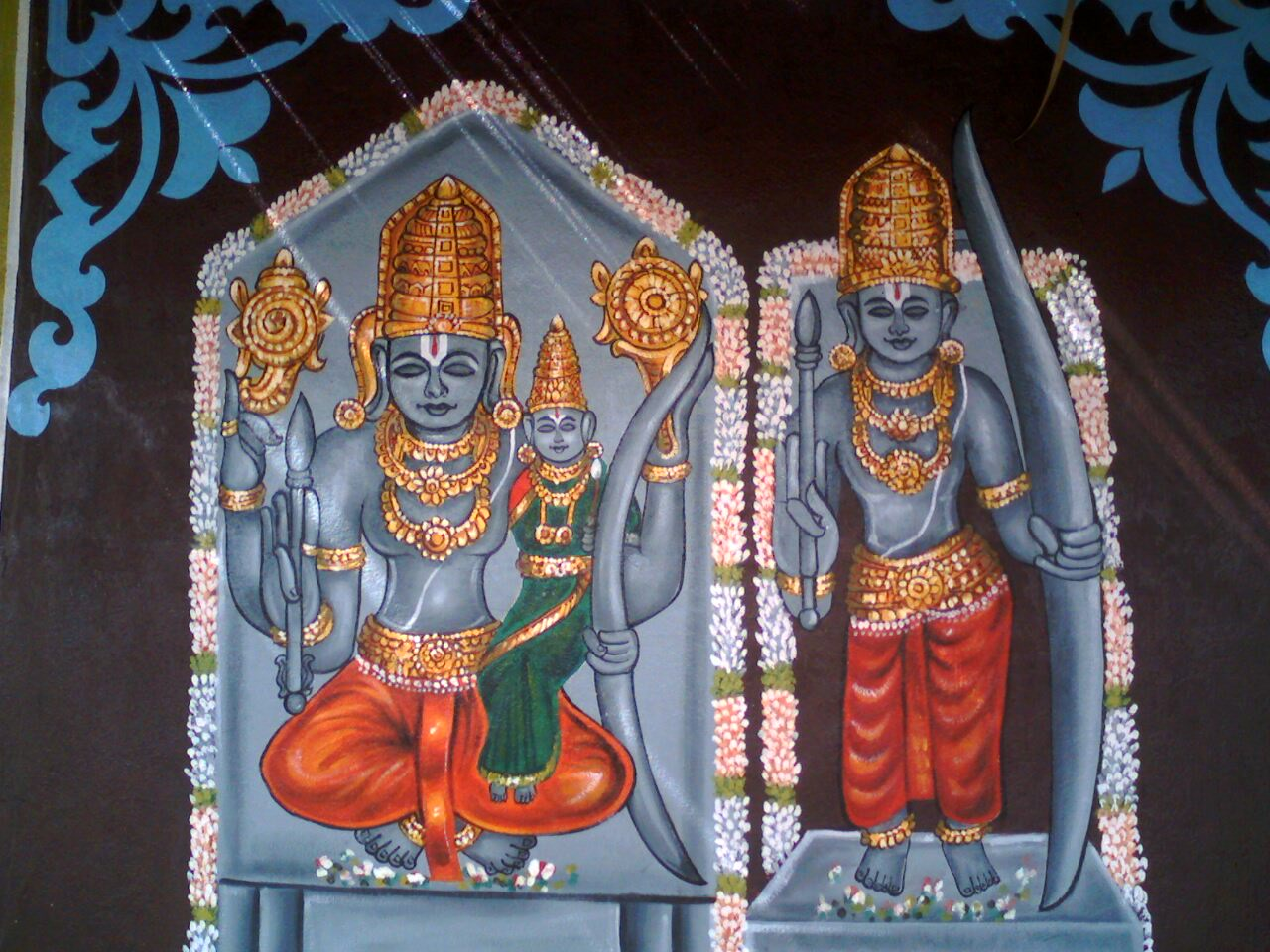
A rare 4th-armed Rama with Sita on his lap (left) and Lakshmana is the central icon of Bhadrachalam temple.

Temples dedicated to Rama are found all over India and in places where Indian migrant communities have resided. In most temples, the iconography of Rama is accompanied by that of his wife Sita and brother Lakshmana. In some instances, Hanuman is also included either near them or in the temple premises.

Hindu temples dedicated to Rama were built by the early 5th century, according to copper plate inscription evidence, but these have not survived. The oldest surviving Rama temple is near Raipur (Chhattisgarh), called the Rajiva-locana temple at Rajim near the Mahanadi river. It is in a temple complex dedicated to Vishnu and dates back to the 7th-century with some restoration work done around 1145 CE based on epigraphical evidence. The temple remains important to Rama devotees in the contemporary times, with devotees and monks gathering there on dates such as Rama Navami.

Some of the Rama temples include:

- Rama Mandir, Ram Janmabhoomi, Ayodhya, Uttar Pradesh.
- Bhadrachalam Temple, Telangana.
- Kodandarama Temple, Vontimitta, Andhra Pradesh.
- Ramateertham Temple, Andhra Pradesh.
- Ramaswamy Temple, Kumbakonam, Tamil Nadu.
- Kola Valvill Ramar Temple, Tiruvelliyangudi, Tamil Nadu.
- Veeraraghava Swamy Temple, Tiruvallur, Tamil Nadu.
- Adi Jagannatha Perumal Temple, Tamil Nadu.
- Ramchaura Mandir, Bihar.
- Mudikondan Kothandaramar Temple, Tamil Nadu.
- Vijayaraghava Perumal temple, Tamil Nadu.
- Punnainallur Kothandaramar Temple, Tamil Nadu.
- Eri-Katha Ramar Temple, Tamil Nadu.
- Kothandarama Temple, Thillaivilagam, Tamilnadu.
- Kothandaramaswamy Temple, Rameswaram, Tamil Nadu.
- Sri Kothanda Ramaswamy Temple, Tamil Nadu.
- Kothandaramar temple, Vaduvur, Tamil Nadu
- Sri Yoga Rama temple, Tamil Nadu.
- Kodandaramaswamy Temple, Tamil Nadu.
- Kothandaramaswami Temple, Nandambakkam, Tamil Nadu.
- Triprayar Sriramaswami Kshetram, Triprayar, Kerala.
- Kalaram Temple, Nashik, Maharashtra.
- Raghunath Temple, Jammu.
- Ram Mandir, Bhubaneswar, Odisha.
- Kodandarama Temple, Chikmagalur, Karnataka.
- Odogaon Raghunath Temple, Odisha.
- Sri Rama Temple, Ramapuram, Kerala.
- Thakurdwara Bhagwan Narainji, Gurdaspur, Punjab
- Vilwadrinatha Temple, Thiruvilwamala, Kerala.
- Sree Ramar Temple, Singapore.
- Gibraltar Hindu Temple, Gibraltar, Britain.
- Perth Ram Temple, Perth, Australia.

== Outside Hinduism ==
=== Jainism ===
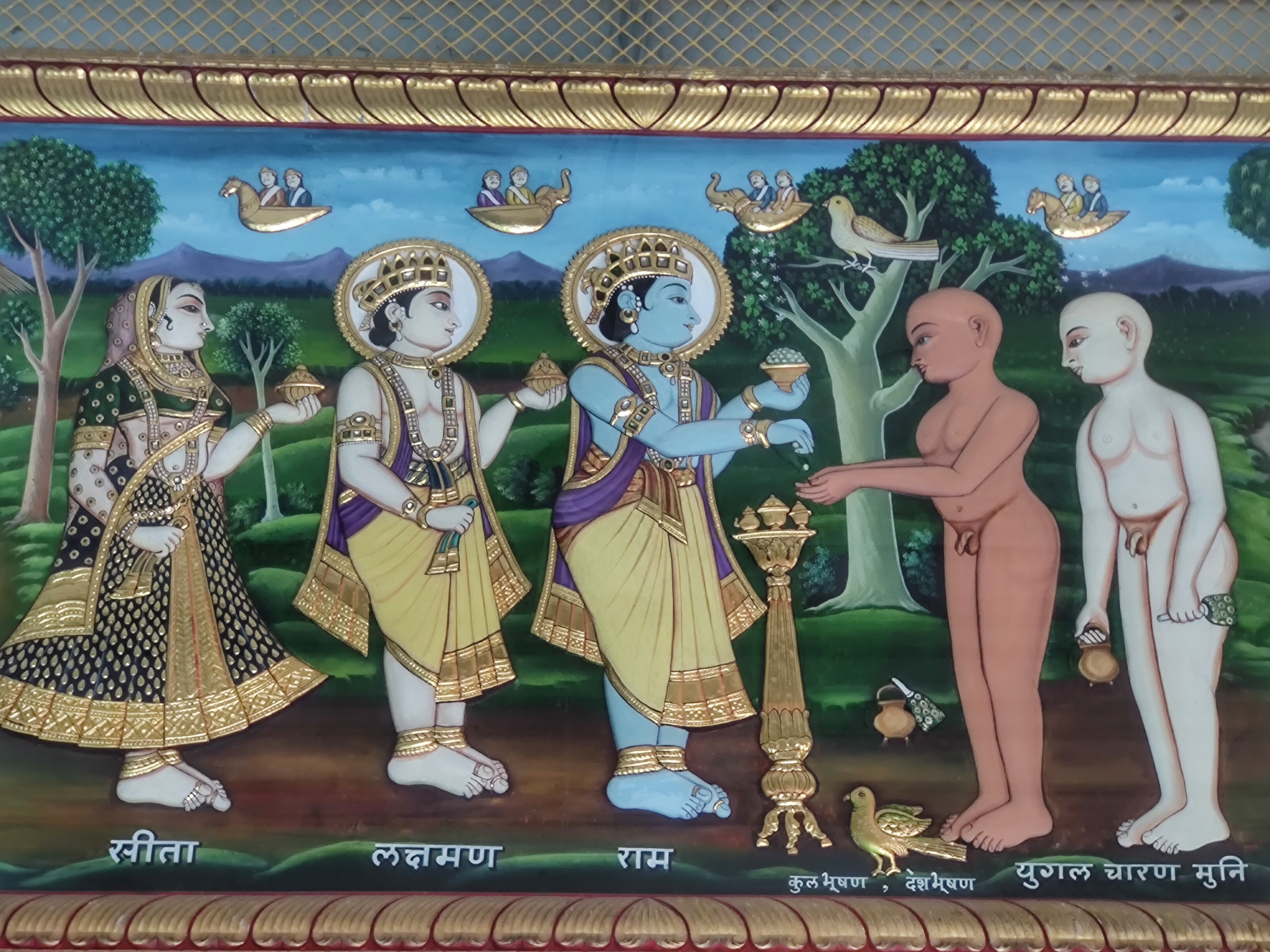
Rama, Lakshmana, and Sita with Jain acharya yugal-charan, Swarn Jain temple in Gwalior.

In Jainism, the earliest known version of the Rama story is variously dated from the 1st to the 5th century CE. This Jain text, credited to Vimalsuri, shows no signs of distinction between Digambara-Svetambara (sects of Jainism), and is in a combination of Maharashtri and Sauraseni languages. These features suggest that this text has ancient roots.

In Jain cosmology, people continue to be reborn as they evolve in their spiritual qualities, until they reach the Jina state and complete enlightenment. This idea is explained as cyclically reborn triads in its Puranas, called the Baladeva, Vasudeva and evil Prati-vasudeva. Rama, Lakshmana and evil Ravana are the eighth triad, with Rama being the reborn Baladeva, and Lakshmana as the reborn Vasudeva. Rama is described to have lived long before the 22nd Jain Tirthankara called Neminatha. In the Jain tradition, Neminatha is believed to have been born 84,000 years before the 9th-century BCE Parshvanatha.

Jain texts tell a very different version of the Rama legend than the Hindu texts, such as those by Valmiki. According to the Jain version, Lakshmana (Vasudeva) is the one who kills Ravana (Prativasudeva). Rama, after he participates in the rescue of Sita and in the preparation for war, does not kill; thus, he remains a non-violent person. The Rama of Jainism has numerous wives as does Lakshmana, unlike the virtue of monogamy given to Rama in the Hindu texts. Towards the end of his life, Rama becomes a Jaina monk then successfully attains siddha, followed by moksha. His first wife, Sita, becomes a Jaina nun at the end of the story. In the Jain version, Lakshmana and Ravana both go to the hell of Jain cosmology, because Ravana killed many, while Lakshmana killed Ravana to stop Ravana's violence. Padmapurana mentions Rama as a contemporary of Munisuvrata, 20th tirthankara of Jainism.

=== Buddhism ===
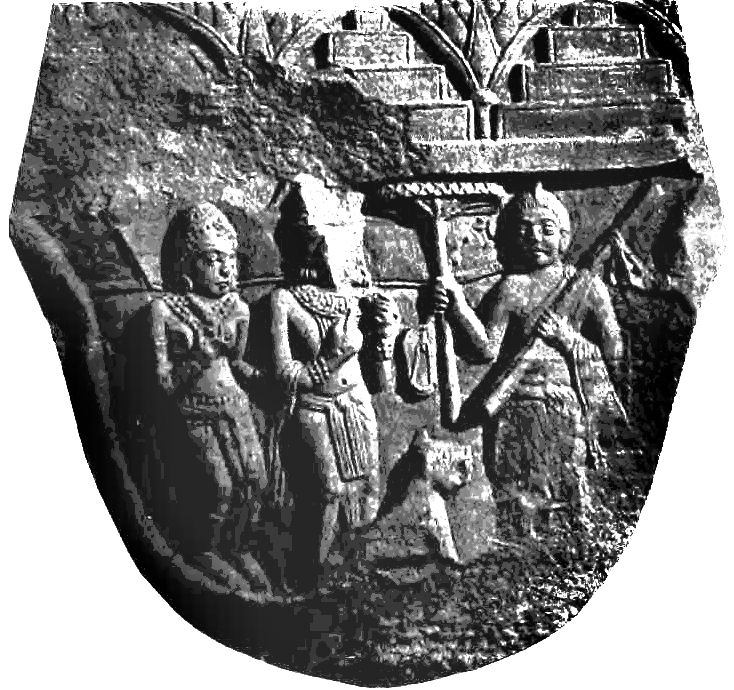
Scene from Dasaratha Jataka, Bharhut, c. 200–300 CE

The Dasaratha-Jātaka (Jātaka No. 461) provides a Buddhist version of the Rama story in which Rama is called Rāma-paṇḍita ("Rama the Wise") and is identified as a previous birth of the Bodhisatta.

In this narrative, King Dasaratha of Benares has three children by his chief queen: Rāma, Lakkhaṇa, and a daughter named Sītā. After the chief queen dies, Dasaratha elevates another consort who bears Prince Bharata and later demands the kingdom for her son. Fearing she may harm his elder children, Dasaratha sends Rāma-paṇḍita, Lakkhaṇa, and Sītā into exile in the Himalayas for twelve years, matching the astrologers' prediction of his own remaining lifespan. Grief-stricken, Dasaratha dies in the ninth year; when Bharata refuses the throne and travels to the forest to report their father's death, Lakkhaṇa and Sītā repeatedly faint and weep uncontrollably, whereas Rāma-paṇḍita neither cries nor grieves, delivering a discourse on the impermanence of life to console them. Declining to return until the twelve-year term expires, Rāma gives Bharata his straw slippers to govern in his stead, and upon completing the exile returns to Benares, marries Sītā, and reigns righteously for 16,000 years.

The Dasaratha-Jātaka diverges markedly from the Hindu Ramayana: it relocates the setting from Ayodhya to Benares, depicts Sītā as Rama's sister (and later queen consort) rather than Janaka's daughter, sets the exile at twelve years instead of fourteen, and entirely omits Ravana, the abduction of Sītā, Hanuman, and the war in Lanka, reshaping the tale into a Buddhist parable of non-attachment and equanimity. Beyond the Jātaka tale, Theravāda chronicles such as the Mahāvaṃsa (Chapter II) and Dīpavaṃsa record Rama (following Dasaratha) within the primordial Solar dynasty lineage descended from Mahāsammata—the first elected king of the aeon—alongside other legendary monarchs such as Mandhātā, Upacara, and Nimi as ancestors of King Okkāka (Ikshvaku) and the Śākyan clan.

The Master having ended this discourse, declared the Truths, and identified the Birth (...): 'At that time, the king Suddhodana was king Dasaratha, Mahamaya was the mother, Rahula's mother was Sita, Ananda was Bharata, and I myself was Rama-Pandita.

— Jataka Tale No. 461, Translator: W.H.D. Rouse

While the Buddhist Jataka texts co-opt Rama and make him an incarnation of Buddha in a previous life, the Hindu texts co-opt the Buddha and make him an avatar of Vishnu. The Jataka literature of Buddhism is generally dated to be from the second half of the 1st millennium BCE, based on the carvings in caves and Buddhist monuments such as the Bharhut stupa. (Note: Richard Gombrich suggests that the Jataka tales were composed by the 3rd century BCE.) The 2nd-century BCE stone relief carvings on Bharhut stupa, as told in the Dasaratha-Jataka, is the earliest known non-textual evidence of Rama story being prevalent in ancient India.

=== Sikhism ===
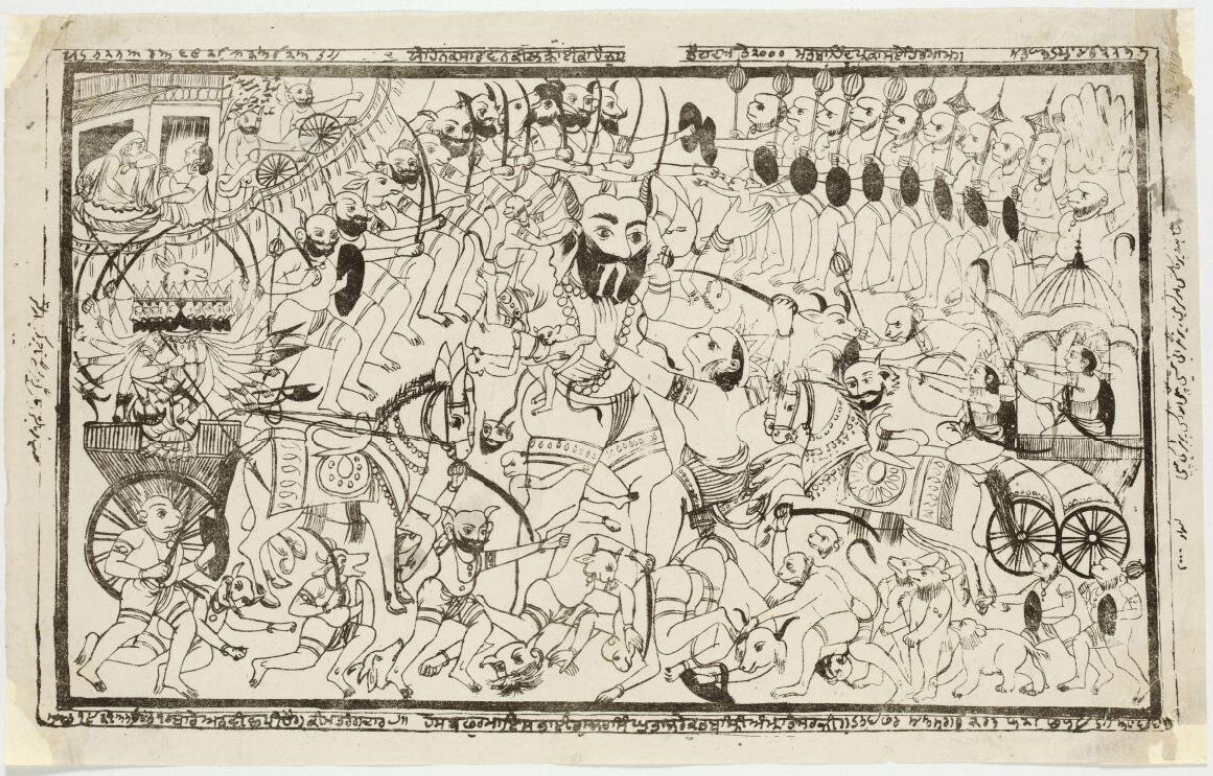
Sikh woodcut of a battle scene from the Ramayana, Lahore or Amritsar, about 1870

Rama is mentioned as one of twenty four divine incarnations of Vishnu in the Chaubis Avtar, a composition in Dasam Granth traditionally and historically attributed to Guru Gobind Singh. (Note: Ath Beesvan Ram Avtar Kathan or Ram Avtar is a Composition in the second sacred Granth of Sikhs i.e Dasam Granth, which was written by Guru Gobind Singh, at Anandpur Sahib. Guru Gobind Singh was not a worshiper of Ramchandra, as after describing the whole Avtar he cleared this fact that ਰਾਮ ਰਹੀਮ ਪ੝ਰਾਨ ਕ੝ਰਾਨ ਅਨੇਕ ਕਹੈਂ ਮਤਿ ਝਕ ਨ ਮਾਨਿਯੋ ॥. Ram Avtar is based on Ramayana, but a Sikh studies the spiritual aspects of this whole composition.) The discussion of Rama and Krishna avatars is the most extensive in this section of the secondary Sikh scripture. The name of Rama is mentioned more than 2,500 times in the Guru Granth Sahib and is considered an avatar along with the Krishna.

== Influence and depiction ==
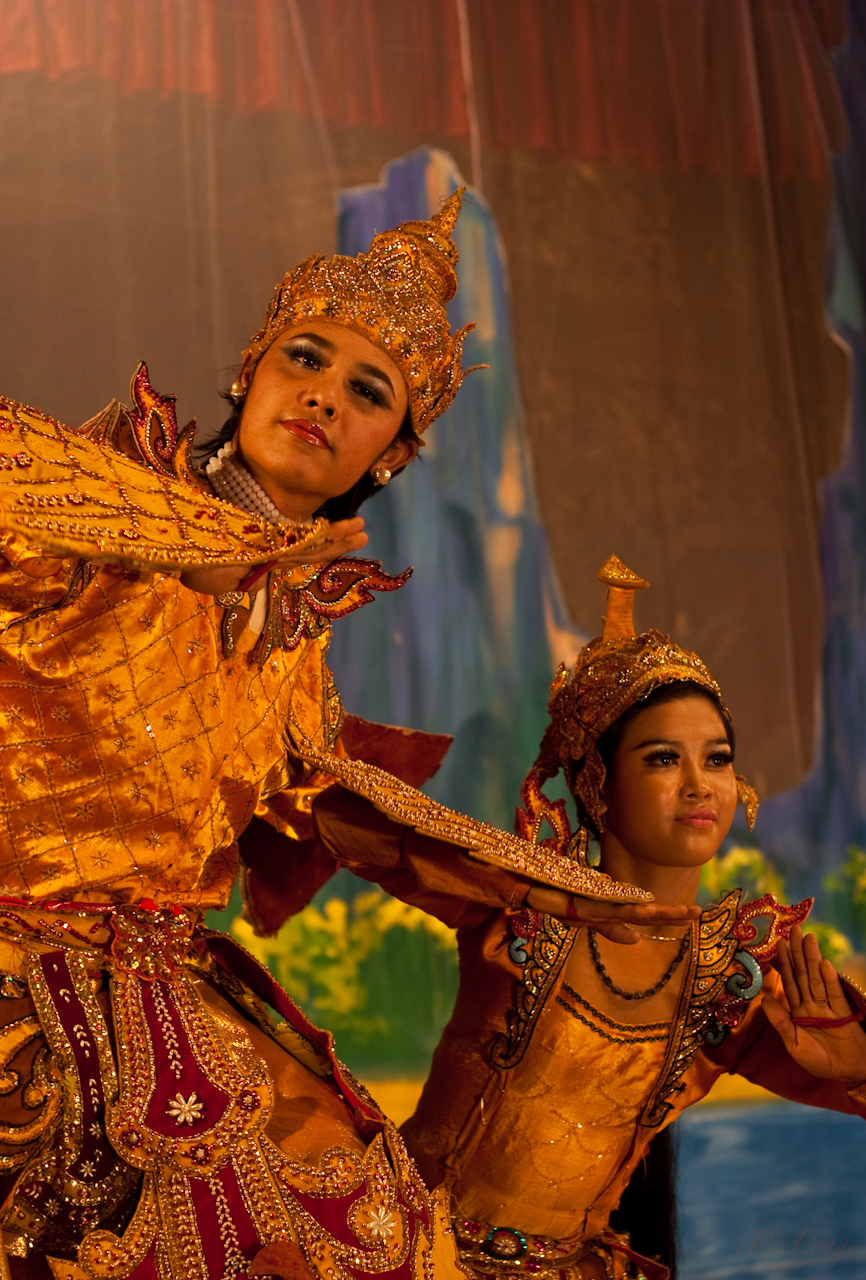
Rama (Yama) and Sita (Thida) in Yama Zatdaw, the Burmese version of the Ramayana

Rama's story has had a major socio-cultural and inspirational influence across South Asia and Southeast Asia.

Few works of literature produced in any place at any time have been as popular, influential, imitated and successful as the great and ancient Sanskrit epic poem, the Valmiki Ramayana.

– Robert Goldman, Professor of Sanskrit, University of California at Berkeley.

According to Arthur Anthony Macdonell, a professor at Oxford and Boden scholar of Sanskrit, Rama's ideas as told in the Indian texts are secular in origin, their influence on the life and thought of people having been profound over at least two and a half millennia. Their influence has ranged from being a framework for personal introspection to cultural festivals and community entertainment. His life stories, states Goldman, have inspired "painting, film, sculpture, puppet shows, shadow plays, novels, poems, TV serials and plays."

According to Douglas Q. Adams, the Sanskrit word Rama is also found in other Indo-European languages such as Tocharian ram, reme, *romo- where it means "support, make still", "witness, make evident". The sense of "dark, black, soot" also appears in other Indo European languages, such as *remos or Old English romig. (Note: The legends found about Rama, state Mallory and Adams, have "many of the elements found in the later Welsh tales such as Branwen Daughter of Llyr and Manawydan Son of Lyr. This may be because the concept and legends have deeper ancient roots.)

In Valmiki)’s Ramayana) and Tulsidas's Ramcharitmanas, Rāma Rājya (lit. 'Rama's Kingdom') is the ultimate benchmark for governance, and as a devout devotee of Rama, Mahatma Gandhi frequently espoused the concept of Rāma Rājya, as a utopian rule in his writings.

"Whether Rama of my imagination ever lived or not on this earth, the ancient ideal of Ramarajya is undoubtedly one of true democracy in which the meanest citizen could be sure of swift justice without an elaborate and costly procedure. Even the dog is described by the poet to have received justice under Ramarajya."

— Mahatma Gandhi
(Young India, September 19, 1929)

=== Paintings ===
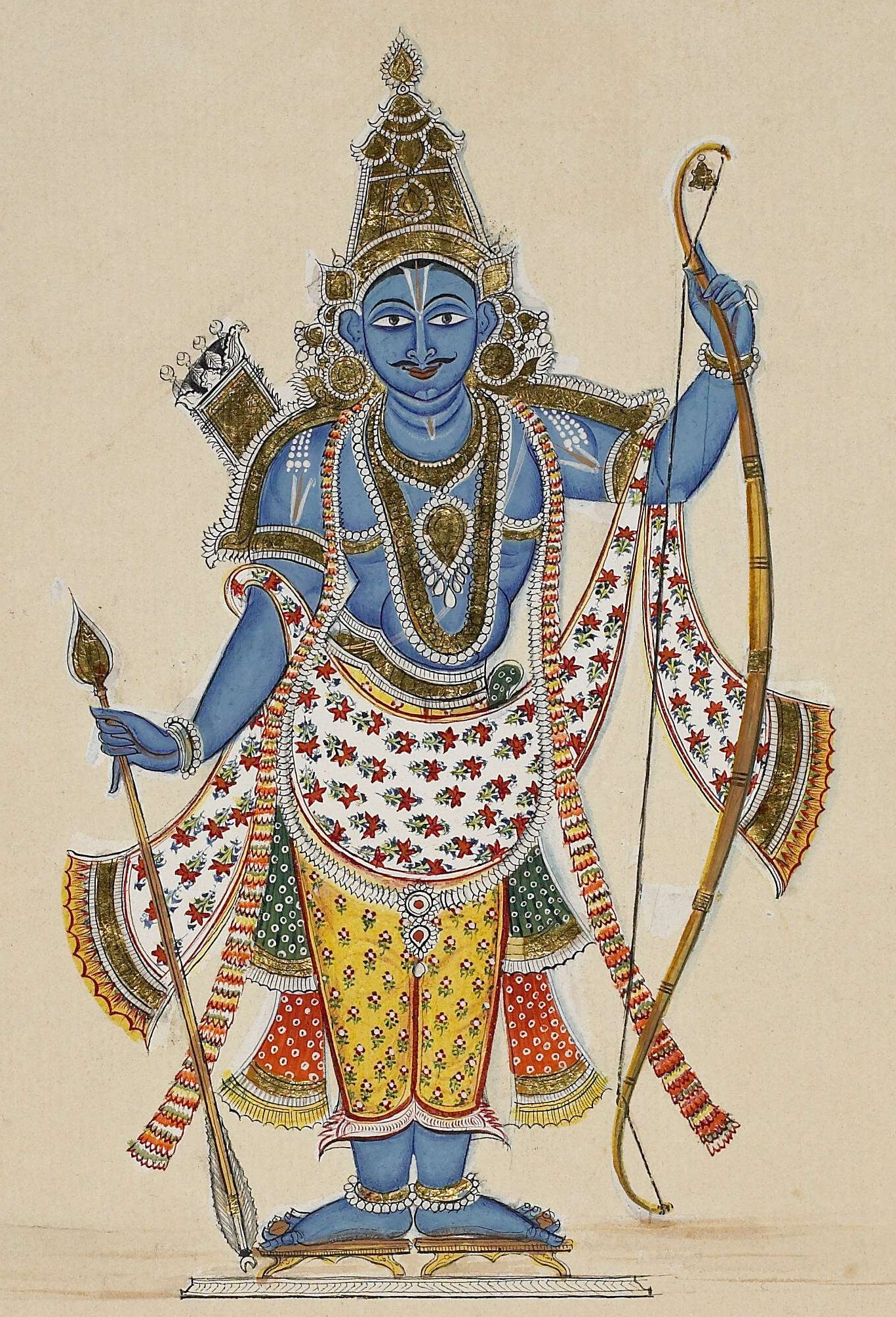
Painting of Rama holding arrows, early 19th century depiction

Rama and Sita have inspired many forms of performance arts and literary works. Madhubani paintings are charismatic art of Bihar, and are mostly based on religion and mythology. In the paintings, Hindu gods like Sita-Rama are in center with their marriage ceremony being one of the primary theme. Rama's exile, Sita's abduction and Lanka war have also been depicted in the Rajput paintings.

=== Music ===
Rama is a primary figure in Maithili music, of the Mithila region. The folk music genre Lagan, mentions about the problems faced by Rama and Sita during their marriage.

=== Hindu arts in Southeast Asia ===
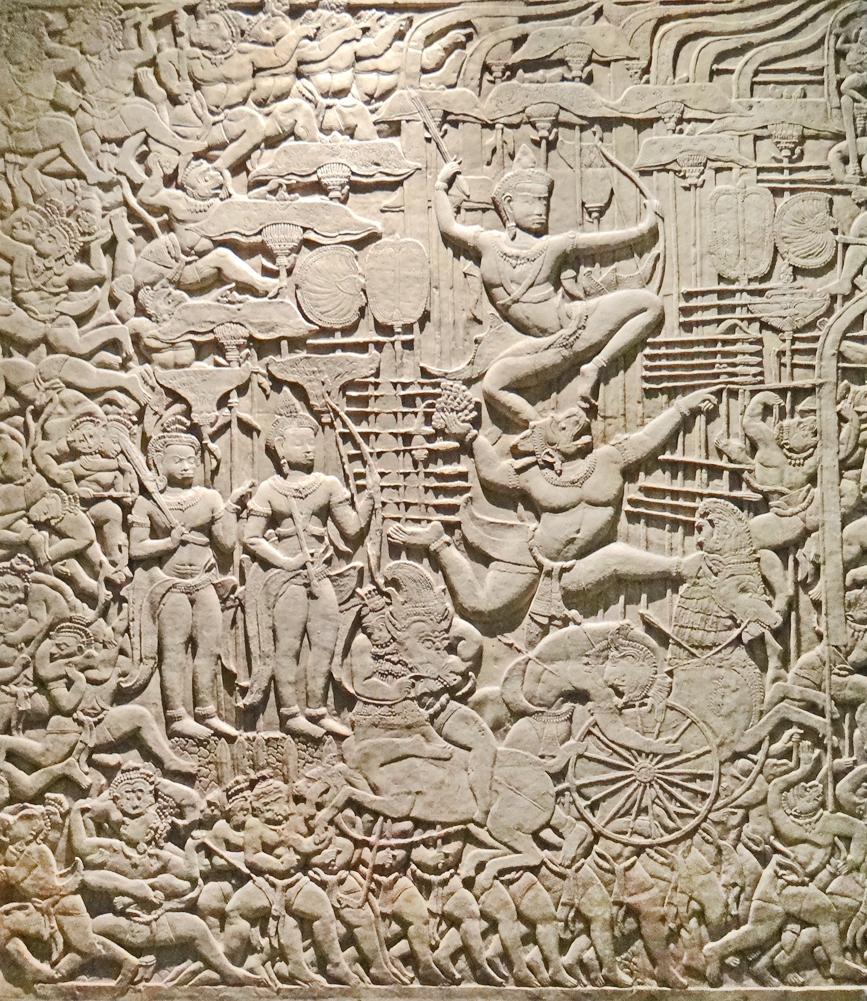
Rama's story is a major part of the artistic reliefs found at Angkor Wat, Cambodia. Large sequences of Ramayana reliefs are also found in Java, Indonesia.

Rama's life story, both in the written form of Sanskrit Ramayana and the oral tradition arrived in southeast Asia in the 1st millennium CE. Rama was one of many ideas and cultural themes adopted, others being the Buddha, the Shiva and host of other Brahmanic and Buddhist ideas and stories. In particular, the influence of Rama and other cultural ideas grew in Java, Bali, Malaya, Burma, Thailand, Cambodia and Laos.

The Ramayana was translated from Sanskrit into old Javanese around 860 CE, while the performance arts culture most likely developed from the oral tradition inspired by the Tamil and Bengali versions of Rama-based dance and plays. The earliest evidence of these performance arts are from 243 CE according to Chinese records. Other than the celebration of Rama's life with dance and music, Hindu temples built in southeast Asia such as the Prambanan near Yogyakarta (Java), and at the Panataran near Blitar (East Java), show extensive reliefs depicting Rama's life. The story of Rama's life has been popular in Southeast Asia.

In the 14th century, the Ayutthaya Kingdom and its capital Ayuttaya was named after the Hindu holy city of Ayodhya, with the official religion of the state being Theravada Buddhism. Thai kings of the reigning Chakri dynasty, continuing into the contemporary era, have been called Rama, a name inspired by Rama of Ramakien – the local version of Sanskrit Ramayana, according to Constance Jones and James Ryan. For example, King Chulalongkorn (1853–1910) is also known as Rama V, while King King Vajiralongkorn who succeeded to the throne in 2016 is called Rama X.

=== Culture ===
In the North Indian region, mainly in Uttar Pradesh and Bihar, people use salutations such as Jai Shri Ram, Jai Siya Ram and Siyavar Ramchandraji Ki Jai. Ramanandi ascetics (called Bairagis) often use chants like "Jaya Sita Ram" and "Sita Ram". The chants of Jai Siya Ram is also common at religious places and gatherings, for example, the Kumbh Mela. It is often used during the recital of Ramayana, Ramcharitmanas, especially the Sundara Kanda.

In Assam, Boro people call themselves Ramsa, which means Children of Ram. In Chhattisgarh, Ramnami people tattooed their whole body with name of Ram.

Rama has been considered as a source of inspiration and has been described as Maryāda Puruṣottama Rāma (transl. The Ideal Man). (Note: Blank 2000, p. 190; Dodiya 2001, pp. 109–110; Tripathy 2015, p. 1) He has been depicted in many films, television shows and plays.

=== Greek literature ===
The Greek historian Arrian, drawing on Megasthenes, records in his Indica that the Indians worshipped a native "Herakles", honoured especially by the Sourasenoi, whose cities included Methora (Mathura). Usually identified with Krishna, but the Tamil scholar D. Pugazhendhi argues that comparisons of Herakles and Rama show them to be the same figure, and that Rama's history influenced the existence of Herakles, in Thailand (as Phra Ram of the Ramakien at Wat Phra Kaew) and in Sri Lanka (at Kelaniya). He highlights the theme of monogamy in Herakles' relations with Iole and Deianira; the deception of Alcmene by Zeus in the guise of her husband, which he compares with Indra's seduction of Ahalya in the guise of Gautama and Herakles' labour of capturing a deer, which he compares with Rama's pursuit of Maricha in the form of a golden deer during Vanvasa. In the same study, Pugazhendhi argues that the myth of Vishnu's boar avatar Varaha, who raises the earth from the ocean on his tusks influenced the Greek account, preserved by Diodorus Siculus, of Herakles carrying the Erymanthian Boar alive on his shoulders and taking over Atlas's burden of the heavens.

=== In popular culture ===
==== Films ====
The following people portrayed Rama in the film adaptation of Ramayana.

- Prithviraj Kapoor portrayed him in the 1934 Bengali film Seeta.
- Prem Adib portrayed him in the 1943 Hindi film Ram Rajya.
- N. T. Rama Rao portrayed him in the 1958 Tamil film Sampoorna Ramayanam.
- N. T. Rama Rao Jr portrayed him in the 1997 Telugu film Ramayanam.
- Prem Nazir portrayed him in the 1960 Malayalam film Seeta.
- Kanta Rao portrayed him in the 1968 Telugu film Veeranjaneya.
- Jeetendra portrayed him in the 1997 Hindi film Lav Kush.
- Nikhil Kapoor and Arun Govil voiced him in the 1992 animated film Ramayana: The Legend of Prince Rama.
- Manoj Bajpayee voiced him in the 2010 animated Hindi film Ramayana: The Epic.
- Nandamuri Balakrishna portrayed him in the 2011 Telugu film Sri Rama Rajyam.
- Kunal Kapoor voiced her in the 2016 Hindi animated film Mahayoddha Rama.
- Prabhas portrayed him in the 2023 Hindi film Adipurush.
- Ranbir Kapoor portrayed him in the 2026 Hindi film Ramayana: Part 1.

==== Television ====
The following people portrayed Rama in the television adaptation of Ramayana.

- Arun Govil portrayed him in the 1987 series Ramayan and the 1998 series Luv Kush.
- Siraj Mustafa Khan portrayed him in the 1997 series Jai Hanuman.
- Nitish Bharadwaj portrayed him in the 2000 series Vishnu Puran and the 2002 series Ramayan.
- Gurmeet Choudhary portrayed him in the 2008 series Ramayan.
- Debargo Sanyal voiced him in the 2008 America animated series Sita Sings the Blues.
- Piyush Sahdev portrayed him in the 2011 series Devon Ke Dev...Mahadev.
- Gagan Malik portrayed him in the 2012 series Ramayan and the 2015 series Sankat Mochan Mahabali Hanumaan.
- Rajneesh Duggal portrayed him in the 2012 mini-series Ramleela – Ajay Devgn Ke Saath.
- Ashish Sharma portrayed him in the 2015 series Siya Ke Ram.
- Himanshu Soni portrayed him in the 2019 series Ram Siya Ke Luv Kush.
- Waseem Mushtaq portrayed him in the 2019 series Shrimad Bhagwat Mahapuran.
- Diganth portrayed him in the 2021 web series Ramyug.
- Amar Upadhyay and Karan Suchak portrayed him in the 2022 series Jai Hanuman – Sankatmochan Naam Tiharo.
- Sujay Reu portrayed him in the 2024 series Shrimad Ramayan.
- Pavan Sharma portrayed him in 2024 DD National series Kakabhushundi Ramayan- Anasuni Kathayein.

==== YouTube ====
- Tarun Chandel portrayed in 2024 YouTube series Valmiki Ramayan

==== Others ====
- Rama's life struggles were portrayed in the "Sita-Rama episode" of the 2023 play, Prem Ramayan.
- Shri Ram Janki Medical College and Hospital in Samastipur, Bihar.
- Rama is a playable character in the video game Smite and its sequel.

== See also ==
- Ayodhya dispute
- Erlang Shen
- Genealogy of Rama
- Ramanama
- Ram Statue
- Jai Shri Ram
- Ramayan (1987 TV series)
- Dashavatara
- Balak Ram
- Ramnam Bank

== Bibliography ==
- Blank, Jonah (2000). Arrow of the Blue-Skinned God: Retracing the Ramayana Through India. Grove Press. ISBN 0-8021-3733-4.
- Griffith, Ramayana, Project Gutenberg, archived from the original on 24 July 2020
- J. P. Mallory; Douglas Q. Adams (1997). Encyclopedia of Indo-European Culture. Taylor & Francis. ISBN 978-1-884964-98-5. Archived from the original on 19 February 2023.
- Menon, Ramesh (2008) [2004]. The Ramayana: A Modern Retelling of the Great Indian Epic. HarperCollins. ISBN 978-0-86547-660-8. Archived from the original on 31 January 2024.
- Valmiki. RamayanaHindi. Gorakhpur, Uttar Pradesh: Gita Press. ISBN 9789364487535.

Rama Ikshvaku dynasty
Preceded by Dasharatha	King of Kosala	Succeeded by Lava
Regnal titles
Preceded by Parashurama	Dashavatara; Treta Yuga	Succeeded by Krishna
