= Vasanthotsavam =

Hindu fair

- Genre: Pilgrimage
- Dates: Trayodasi, Chaturdasi and Pournami in the Hindu month of Chaitra
- Frequency: Every year
- Venue: Venkateswara Swamy Temple
- Location: Tirumala
- Country: india
- Most recent: April 10 to April 12, 2025
- Next event: March 31 to April 2, 2026

Vasanthotsavam is an annual Seva celebrated in Tirumala to celebrate the arrival of spring season.

Vasantotsavam is the combination of 2 words - "Vasantha" (Spring season in Sanskrit) and "Utsavam" (festival in Sanskrit). The festival is celebrated on the three days of tryodasi, chaturdasi and pournami in the month of Chaitra In the Gregorian calendar, the festival occurs between the end of March through mid-April.

== History & start ==
The start of the festival celebration in Tirumala is recorded during the period of Achyutaraya (Saka 1460). The festival was started with the fund of 3000 narpanam contributed by Periya Solai, the son of the accountant in the temple.

== Function ==
The festival starts with ankurarpanam (sowing the nine kind of seeds) ceremony conducted on the day of Uttarabhadra star in Hindu calendar month of phalguna. One day before the start of the Vasanthotsavam festival, punya vachanam (purificatory rites), vaasthu santhi (worship of deity and lord of nature and their elements and natural forces as well as lord and deity of directions and environment) and samprokshanam rituals are performed by the temple priests(sacred consecration). Access to these rituals are not open to public.

Abhishekam - specifically called Snapana Thirumanjanam (Holy bathing), is performed to the utsava murthy and his consorts on all the three days in the Vasanthotsavam hall outside the temple premises. On the third day, abhishekam is performed to the idols of Rama, Sita, Lakshmana and Hanuman along with Krishna and Rukmini.Procession of the consecrated idols are taken in a procession in the evening on all the three days.

The Vasanthotsavam hall was demolished as part of the revamping of the temple surroundings in 2006 and since then the Vaibhavotsava Mandapam situated in front of the main temple is used for the festival.

Pictures from Tirumala Vasanthotsavam festival

== Pilgrim participation ==
Vasonthotsavam is a arjitha seva - paid service where pilgrims pay to view the ceremony. Each ticket costs Rs 300 ($7) and allows 1 person. Apart from entry to the abhishekam hall, the ticket holder receives one silk angavastram for men, a blouse piece for the women, 2 dosas, 1 vadas and temple annaprasadams (rice based blessed food).
