= Kothandaramaswami Temple, Nandambakkam =

Coordinates: 13.017302°N 80.191254°E

Religion
- Affiliation: Hinduism
- District: Chennai
- Deity: Lord Rama

Location
- Location: Chennai
- State: Tamil Nadu
- Country: India
- Interactive map of Kothandaramaswami Temple, Nandambakkam

Kothandaramaswami Temple is a Hindu temple located at Nandambakkam, a suburb of Chennai, India. Dedicated to Rama, the spot is associated with the legendary sage Bhrigu.

== History ==
The temple was constructed by Vijayanagara Empire. The kings, initially, built shrines for Rama, Lakshmana and Sita. Later shrines were built for Srinivasa, Alwars, Hanuman, and other deities.

== See also ==
- Religion in Chennai
