= Bhaktamal =

Medieval poem written in Braj language in India

Bhaktmal
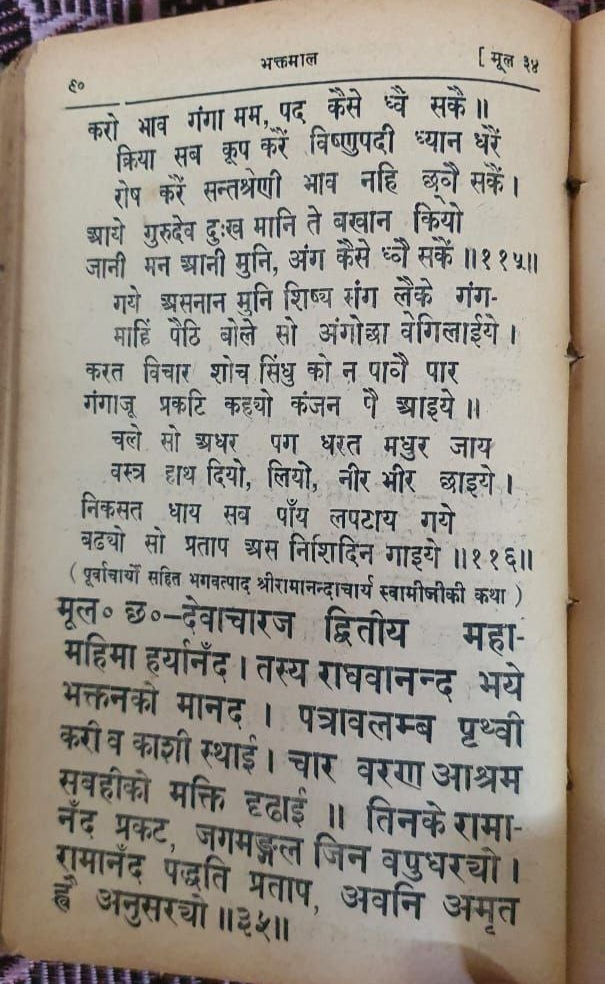
- Title page
- Author: Nabha Dass
- Original title: भक्तमाल
- Language: Braj language
- Subject: Description of Saints
- Genre: Poem
- Publication place: British India

Bhaktamal (Hindi: भक्तमाल, IAST: Bhaktamāla, meaning "garland of devotees"), written c. 1585, is a poem in the Braj language that gives short biographies of more than 200 bhaktas. It was written by Nabha Dass, a saint belonging to the tradition of Ramananda. Though considered a hagiography by some, the work recounts no miraculous events, and is widely believed to be an unbiased account of bhaktas across all sectarian paths. The Bhaktamal gives the earliest reliable account of many bhaktas, and hence is considered an important source for literary and devotional history of northern India. For example, Bhaktamal mentions about peity of Ramanandi saint Shri Bhagwanji of Gurdaspur (in Punjab) and miraculous powers of his disciple Shri Narainji, who founded the Ramanandi Vaishnav temple named Thakurdwara Bhagwan Narainji in Pandori dham in Gurdaspur, Punjab.

In Bhaktamal, Goswami Nabha Das ji explains the lineage of Goswami Tulasidas ji, the author of Ramacharitmanas, and makes a mention of Shri Krishnadas Payahari ji of Galtaji and indirectly quotes his lineage too.

अनंतानंद पद परसि के लोकपालसे ते भये । गयेश करमचंद अल्ह पयहारी ॥
सारीरामदास श्रीरंग अवधि गुण महिमा भारी । तिनके नरहरि उदित ॥

“By touching the divine feet of Sri Anantānand, his disciples Sri Gayēśa, Sri Karamachand, Sri Alhadās, Sri Krishnadas Payahārī, Sri Sārīrāmadās, Sri śrīrangāchārya became equal to Loka-paals in virtues and glory! Thereafter Sri Narharidās appeared as the disciple of Sri śrīrangāchārya.”

— [Bhakta-maal, Chhappay 37 by Nabha das ji]

Also in Bhaktamaal, Goswami Nabhadas has also mentions the four Vaiṣṇava Sampradaya in Chappay 28:

Bhaktamaal Chappay 28

रामानन्द उदार, सुधानिधि अवनि कल्पतरु । विष्णुस्वामी बोहित्थ सिन्धु संसार पार करु ॥ मध्वाचारज मेघ भक्ति सर ऊसर भरिया । निम्बादिति आदित्य, कुहर अज्ञान जु हरिया ॥ जनम करम भागवत धरम संप्रदाय थापी अघट । चौबीस प्रथम हरि बपु धरे त्यों चतुर्व्यूह कलिजुग प्रगट ॥२८॥ —Bhaktamal Chappay 28

== Dating ==
The Bhaktamal was written between 1585 and 1623.

== Authentic Edition ==
The most authentic edition of Bhaktamal was published by Jankidas Sri Vaishnav known as Bhaktamal Bhaskara from Varanasi in 1965, in that edition he has used oldest hand written manuscripts of Bhaktamal. Acharya Baldev Upadhyay (1899–1999), confirming it says in the very starting of this edition:

मैंने श्री जानकीदासजी श्रीवैष्णव द्वारा सम्पादित 'भक्तमाल' को यत्रतत्र देखा। ग्रन्थ बड़े परिश्रम तथा मनोयोग के साथ सम्पादित किया गया है। प्रियादास जी की प्रख्यात टीका के साथ यह ग्रन्थ पहिले भी प्रकाशित था, परन्तु यह संस्करण इतः पूर्व संस्करणों से अनेक अंश में विशिष्ट है। सम्पादक ने मूल तथा टीका के पाठ संशोधन के निमित्त अनेक प्राचीन हस्तलेखों का भी इसमें विवेक के साथ उपयोग किया है। साथ ही साथ जिन महात्माओं के विषय में प्रियादास जी मौन हैं अथवा स्वल्पाक्षर में ही विवरण दिया है, उनका विवरण यहाँ विशेष रूप से श्री जानकीदास जी ने दिया है। इस प्रकार यह नूतन संस्करण मूल के उपबृंहण के साथ ही साथ प्रियादास जी की टीका का भी उपबृंद्दण प्रस्तुत करता है। ऐसे सुन्दर तथा विद्वत्तापूर्ण, प्रामाणिक तथा सुविशुद्ध संस्करण के प्रस्तुतकर्ता जानकीदास जी भक्तों तथा साहित्य रसिकों के धन्यवाद के समुचित पात्र हैं। मैं इस ग्रन्थ के बहुल प्रचार की कामना करता हूँ।
- आचार्य बलदेव उपाध्याय

This translates to: "The Bhaktamal edited by Shri Jaankidas Shree Vaishnav Ji is commendably crafted with great effort and spiritual dedication. While previously published with the renowned commentary of Priyadas Ji, this edition stands out due to several distinct aspects compared to earlier versions. The editor judiciously incorporated various ancient manuscripts for textual revisions and employed discretion in using descriptions from these manuscripts, especially regarding the accounts of revered personalities, where Shri Jaankidas Ji has provided detailed insights that were either silent or briefly mentioned by Priyadas Ji. This fresh edition not only presents the original text and the commentary by Priyadas Ji but also supplements it with additional elucidations. Shri Jaankidas Ji, the presenter of this exquisitely erudite, authentic, and refined edition, rightfully deserves the gratitude of devotees and enthusiasts of literature. I wish for extensive promotion and dissemination of this book."

Jankidas Sri Vaishnav has explained why there was a need of revision of Bhaktamal, he said, "when the narrator saints used to narrate the story of Bhaktamal, learned saints often questions the narrator, whether the errors in metrics, rhythm, interpolations, and historical misconceptions present in the Bhaktamal? producing poetic flaws and irrelevant meanings, were they part of Nabhadas composition? Or did they enter due to the ignorance or insistence of copyists later on?". As seeing all these things Jankidas Sri Vaishnav has started collecting all the old manuscripts of Bhaktamal and in accordance with that created the most authentic edition of Bhaktamal.

== Commentaries, translations and adaptations ==
- Hindi commentary titled Bhaktirasbodhini by Priyadas in 1712.
- A Rajasthani adaptation, Dadupanthi Bhaktamal by Raghavdas in 1720. This work gives biographies of 1200 saints of the Dadupanthi order.
- A Gurmukhi commentary, by Bhai Gurdas in the eighteenth century.
- Hindi commentary Bhaktamalpradipan in Persian manuscript by Tulsiram in the eighteenth century.
- A Bengali adaptation, Bhaktamal by Loldas in eighteenth century.
- Hindi translation titled Bhaktakalpadruma by Pratap Sinha in the nineteenth century.
- Hindi translation titled Shri Bhaktamal: Tika, Tilak, aur Namavali Sahit by Sitaramsharan Bhagavan Prasad in 1903.

== Legacy ==
The Bhaktamal served as inspiration for the Sikh text Sikkhān dī Bhagat-māl, attributed to Bhai Mani Singh, which was influenced by the earlier Bhaktamal of Nabhadas.

== See also ==
- Tulsidas
- Valmiki Samhita
- Vaishnava Matabja Bhaskara
- Maithili Maha Upanishad
- Sri Ramarchan Paddati
