= Bhagat Pipa =

Vaishnava Bhakti poet-saint of Ramanandi Tradition

Bhagat Pipa Bairagi
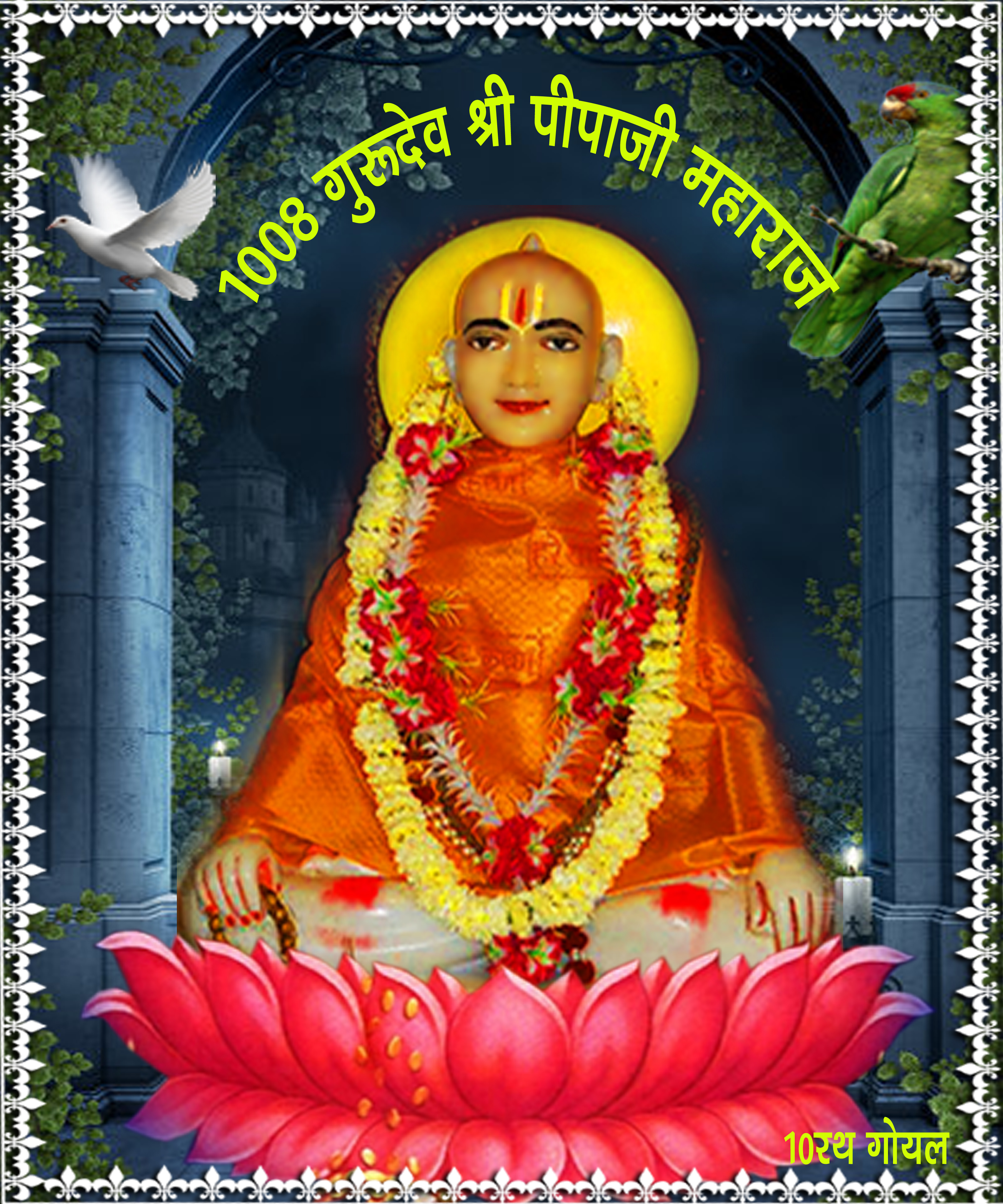
- Statue of Sant Pipa Bairagi

Personal life
- Born: 5 April 1425 Gagron, Jhalawar, Rajasthan, India
- Died: Unknown (~early 15th century)
- Spouse: Rani Sita
- Children: Raja Dwarkanath
- Known for: 1 verse in Guru Granth Sahib.
- Other names: Raja Pipaji; Pratap Singh; Rao Pipa; Sardar Pipa; Sant Pipaji; Pipa Bairagi
- Occupation: Ruler of Gagron

Religious life
- Religion: Hinduism
- Philosophy: Vishishtadvaita
- Sect: Ramanandi Sampradaya

Religious career
- Teacher: Ramananda

Bhagat Pipa (born 1425) was a Rajput ruler of Gagaraungarh who abdicated the throne to become a Hindu mystic poet and saint of the Bhakti movement. He was born in the Malwa region of North India (east Rajasthan) in approximately AD 1425.

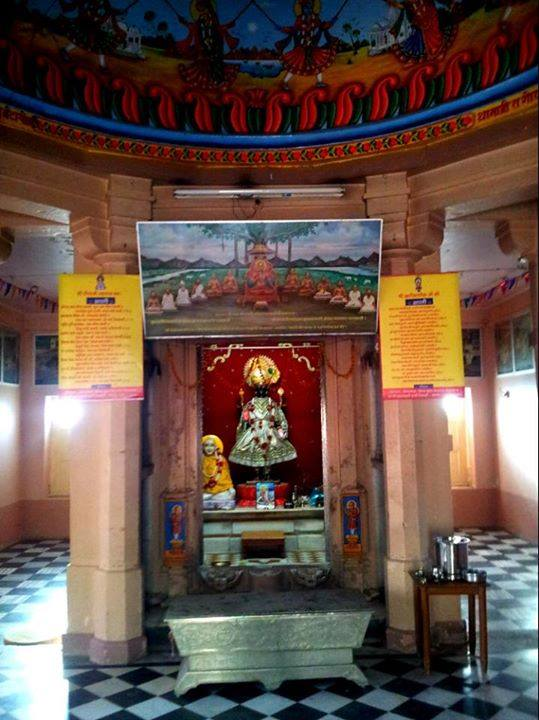
Temple in Samdari

Pipa's exact date of birth and death are unknown, but it is believed that he lived in the late fourteenth and early fifteenth century. Born into a warrior class and royal family, Pipa is described as an early Shaivism (Shiva) and Sakta (Durga) follower. Thereafter, he adopted Vaishnavism as a disciple of Ramananda, and later preached Nirguni (god without attributes) beliefs of life. Bhagat Pipa is considered one of the earliest influential sants of the Bhakti movement in 15th century northern India.

== Life ==
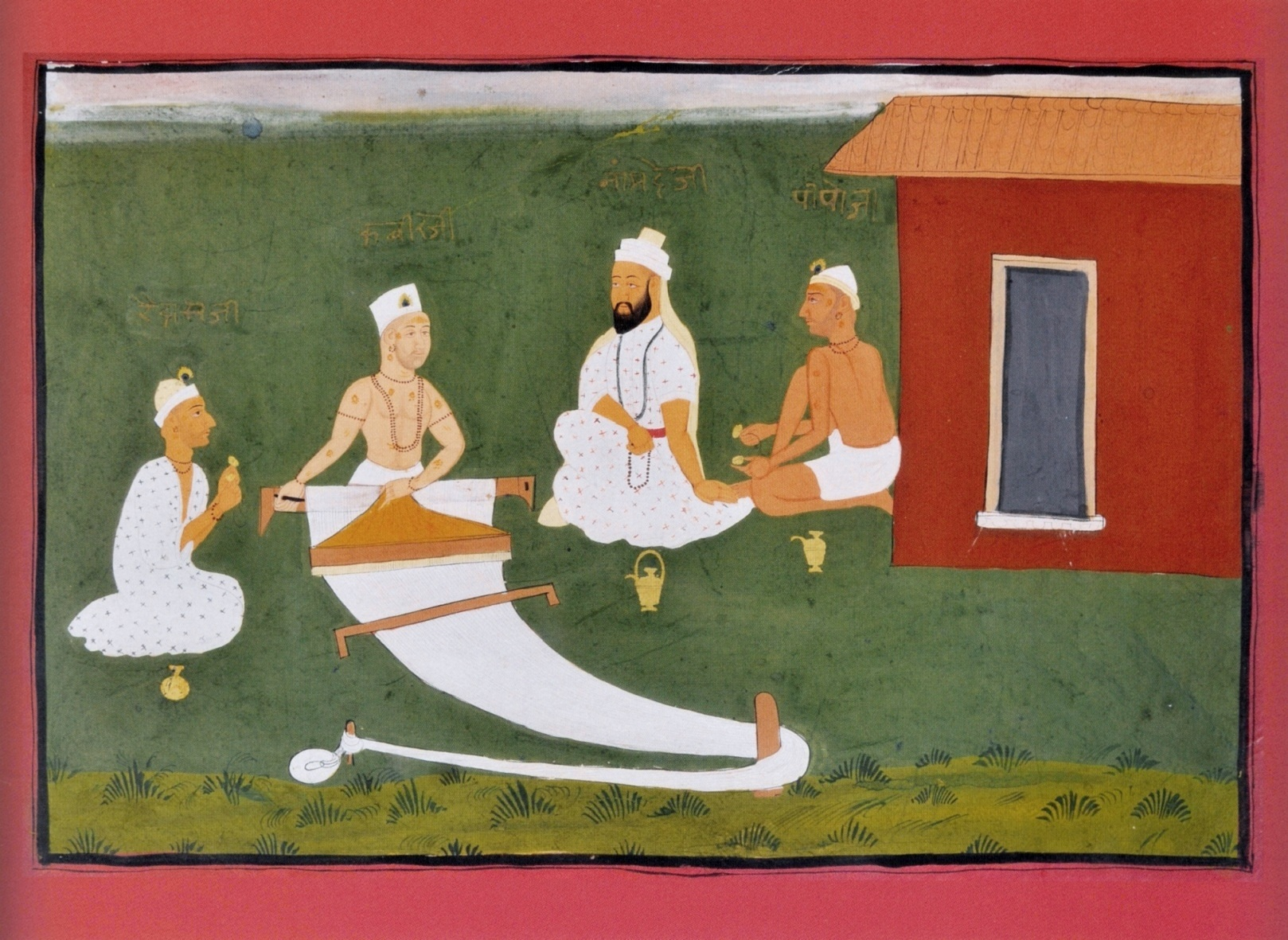
Pipa (rightmost) with other Bhagats of Hinduism/Sikhism, Ravidas, Kabir and Namdev.

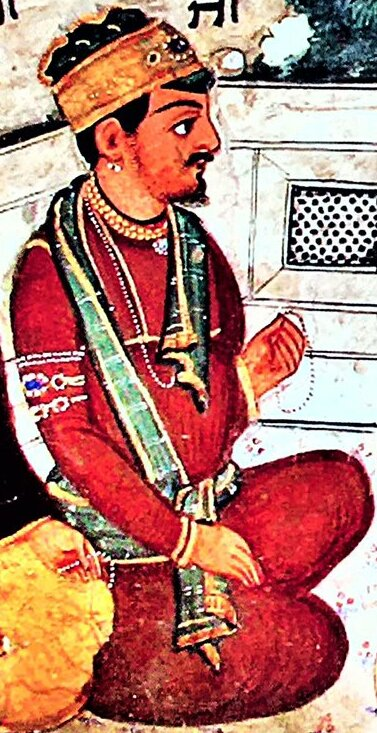
Detail of Bhagat Pipa from a mural at Gurdwara Baba Atal in Amritsar

Pipa was born into a Rajput royal family at Gagaron, in the present-day Jhalawar district of Rajasthan. He became the king of Gagaraungarh. Pipa worshipped the Hindu goddess Durga Bhavani and kept her idol in a temple within his palace. While Pipa was the king Gagaraungarh, he abdicated and became a 'sanyasi' and accepted Ramananda as his guru. He then joined Ramananda's Vaishnavism Bhakti, a movement with a strong monist emphasis based out of Varanasi. In one of his works "Sri Vaishnav Dharm Mangalam" he says:

Sri Vaishnav Dharma Mangalam

सीतारामसमारम्भां श्रीबोधनायमध्यमाम् । अस्मादाचार्यपर्यन्तां वन्दे गुरुपरम्पराम् ॥1॥ नत्त्वा रामं तथा रामानन्दाचार्य यतीश्वरम् । सर्वमङ्गलदं कुर्वे वैष्णवधर्ममङ्गलम् ॥2॥—Sri Vaishnav Dharma Mangalam

According to Bhaktamal, a Bhakti movement hagiography, his wife, Sita, stayed with him before and after his abdication when he became a wandering monk. The hagiography mentions many episodes of his sannyasa life, such as one where robbers tried to steal his buffalo that provided milk to his companions. When he stumbled into the robbery in progress, he began helping the robbers and suggested that they should take the calf. The robbers were so touched that they abandoned their ways and became Pipa's disciples.

In his later life, Bhagat Pipa, as with several other disciples of Ramananda such as Kabir and Dadu Dayal, shifted his devotional worship from saguni Vishnu avatar (Dvaita, dualism) to nirguni (Advaita, monism) god, that is, from god with attributes to god without attributes. According to the records found with local bards, 52 Rajput chiefs from clans of Gohil, Chauhan, Dahiya, Chavada, Dabhi, Makwana (Jhala), Rakhecha, Bhati, Parmar, Tanwar, Solanki, and Parihar resigned from their titles and offices and gave up alcohol, meat, and violence. Instead, those chiefs dedicated their lives to the teachings of their guru & former king.

Pipa's dates of birth and death are unknown, but the traditional genealogy in Bhakti hagiography suggests that he died in 1400 CE.

== Key teachings and influence ==
Pipa taught that God is within one's own self, and that true worship is to look within and have reverence for God in each human being.

Within the body is the god, within the body is the temple,
within the body is all the Jangamas
within the body the incense, the lamps, and the food-offerings,
within the body is the puja-leaves.

After searching so many lands,
I found the nine treasures within my body,
Now there will be no further going and coming,
I swear by Rama.

— Sant Pipa, Gu dhanasari, Translated by Vaudeville

He shared same views as Guru Nanak, the founder of Sikhism, and Bhagat Pipa's hymns are included in the Guru Granth Sahib.

== In popular culture ==
Shri Krishna Bhakta Peepaji (1923) by Shree Nath Patankar and Bhakt Peepaji (1980) by Dinesh Rawal are two Indian films about the legends of the saint.

== See also ==
- Swami Ramanandacharya
- Vaishnav Matabja Bhaskar
- Valmiki Samhita
- Maithili Maha Upanishad
- Ramanandi Sampradaya
- Bhaktamala
