= Sita (disambiguation) =

Sita is the consort of Lord Rama (incarnation of Vishnu) and an avatar of Sri Lakshmi, the Hindu goddess.

Sita, Seeta, Seetha or SITA may also refer to:

== Places and jurisdictions ==
- Sita, Mauritania, a former Ancient city and bishopric in Roman Africa, now a Latin Catholic titular see
- Sita, a village in Spermezeu Commune, Bistriţa-Năsăud County, Romania
- Seetha River
- Seeta, Uganda, a township in Uganda

== People with the given name ==
=== Politics and royalty ===
- Sita bint Fahd Al Damir, Saudi royal
- Sita Devi (Maharani of Baroda), former queen of Baroda
- Sita Devi (Maharani of Kapurthala), former queen of Kapurthala
- Sita Devi Boudel, Nepalese politician
- Sita Devi Yadav, Nepalese politician
- Sita Tiwaree, Thai politician

=== Arts and entertainment ===
- Sita (singer) (born 1980), Dutch pop singer
- Sita Chan (1987–2013), Hong Kong singer and actress
- Seetha Doraiswamy (born 1926), Jalatharangam and Carnatic Musician
- Seetha (actress), Tamil film actress
- Seeta Devi (actress), Indian actress
- Seetha (Malayalam actress), Indian film actress in Malayalam movies during the 1990s
- Sita Devi (painter) (1914–2005), Indian artist

=== Other ===
- Sita, favorite wife of Bhagat Pipa
- Seetha Hallett (born 1979), British TV presenter

== People with the surname ==
- Kasirayi Sita (born 1978), Zimbabwean long-distance runner

== Stage, film and television ==
- Sita, three act opera (1899-1906) by Gustav Holst
- Seeta (1933 film), 1933 film by Sisir Bhaduri
- Seeta (1934 film), 1934 film by Debaki Bose that was featured in the 2nd Venice International Film Festival
- Seetha (1960 film), a Malayalam language film directed by M Kunchacko
- Seetha (1967 film), a Tamil language film directed by A. P. Nagarajan
- Seetha (1970 film), a Kannada language film directed by Vadiraj
- Seetha (1980 film), a Malayalam language film directed by P Govindan
- Seetha (1990 film), a Tamil language film directed by S.A.Chandrasekhar
- Sita (2019 film), a Telugu language film directed by Teja
- Seetha (TV series), Indian television series (2016–2022)
- Sita, a fictional character portrayed by Alia Bhatt in the 2022 Indian film RRR

== Companies and organizations ==
- SITA (business services company), a multinational aviation information technology company
- SITA (waste management company), a waste management subsidiary of the French multinational company Suez
- SITA UK, the UK arm of SITA waste management
- Sita Air, an airline based in Sinamangal Ward, Kathmandu, Nepal
- Transit Systems Victoria, a bus operator in Melbourne, Australia formerly known as Sita Buslines
- SITA (ISP), South African Based Internet Service Provider
- SITA, Suriname Investment and Trade Agency, a Surinamese government institution

== Others ==
- Sita: Warrior of Mithila, a 2017 Indian novel by Amish Tripathi
- 244 Sita, an asteroid
- Swedish interactive thresholding algorithm or SITA, a test to determine visual field loss in eyes
- Search incident to arrest
- Sita, a 1976 book by Kate Millett

== See also ==
- Seta (disambiguation)
- Gokulathil Seethai (disambiguation)
