= Ramanandi Sampradaya =

Branch of the Vaishnava Hinduism

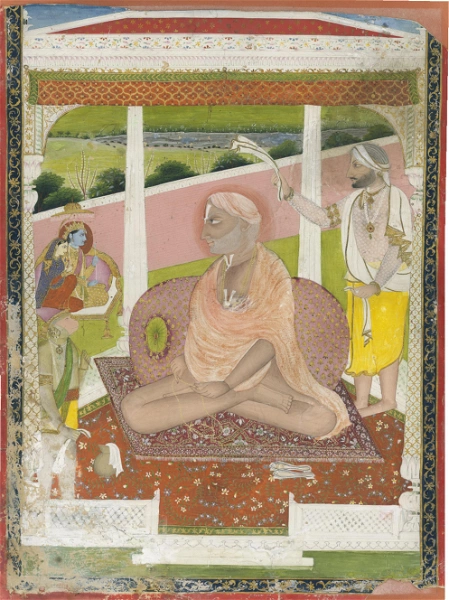
- Portrait of a Ramanandi ascetic worshipping Sita Rama in Mandi (Himachal Pradesh, India), first half of the 19th century

Founder
- Ramananda

Regions with significant populations
- India • Singapore • Malaysia • Nepal • Trinidad and Tobago • Guyana • Suriname • Caribbean • Fiji • Mauritius • South Africa • United Kingdom • United States • Canada • Australia • New Zealand

Religions
- Hinduism

Scriptures
- Valmiki Ramayana, Adhyatma Ramayana, Ramcharitmanas, Vedas, Bhaktamal, Vaishnava Matabja Bhaskara, Vinaya Patrika, Ananda Bhashya (Brahma Sutra Upaniṣad Gita), Ramarchana Paddhati, Maithili Maha Upanishad, Valmiki Samhita, Hanuman Chalisa, Sita Upanishad

The Ramanandi Sampradaya (IAST: Rāmānandī), also known as the Ramavats (Rāmāvat), is one of the largest Vaishnava sects. Of the 52 sub-branches of Vaishnavism, divided into four Vaishnava sampradayas, 36 are held by the Ramanandi. The sect mainly emphasises the worship of Rama, Sita, Hanuman, and the avatars of Vishnu. It considers Rama and Sita to be the Supreme Absolute who are not different from each other. It is considered to have been founded by Ramananda, a 14th-century Vaishnava saint.

== History ==
The Ramanandi Sampradaya originates from Rama, who initiated Sita with his six-letter mantra. Sita later initiated her beloved disciple Hanuman with the same mantra. According to Shanti Lala Nagar, Valmiki Samhita says:

The Supreme Being, Rama, always ready to protect his eternal servants and to assist those with meek hearts. This is well-known in the Vedas. He created this universe and, with the desire for the welfare of people, Rama imparted the transcendental mantra to Sita, the daughter of King Janaka than She revealed this to the glorious Hanuman, the repository of virtues. Hanuman then conveyed it to Brahma, who in turn passed it on to the sage Vasishtha. Thus, in this sequence, the divine mantra descended into this world.

It is claimed that this tradition has been established in all four Yugas, and that in Kaliyuga, Rama himself appeared as Ramanandacharya at Prayagraj.

Bhaktamal is a hagiographic work on Hindu saints and devotees written by Nabhadas in 1660, and was a core text for all Vaishnavas, including Ramanandis. Many localised commentaries of Bhaktamal were taught to young Vaishnavas across India. In the 19th century, the proliferation of the printing press in the Gangetic plains of North India allowed various commentaries of the text to be widely distributed. Of these, Jankidas Sri Vaishnav's edition of Bhaktamal, known as Bhaktamal Bhaskara, is considered to be the most authoritative, as he had used the oldest handwritten manuscripts in this edition.

It is said that the propagator of the Ramanadi tradition is Sita. She first imparted teachings to Hanuman, through which the revelation of this secret occurred in the world. Due to this, the name of this tradition is Sri Sampradaya, and its main mantra is referred to as the 'Ram Tarak Mantra'. The guru imparts the initiation of sacred Ram mantra into the disciple's ear. They apply an upward-pointing tilak (urdhva pund) on the forehead. Complete devotion and immersion in devotional songs (bhajans) is the tradition's way of life. Most saints lead a life of renunciation (paramhansa) within this tradition. Farquhar credits Ramananda and his followers as the origin of the North Indian practice of using Ram to refer to the Absolute. Farquhar finds no evidence to show that Ramananda endeavoured to "overturn caste as a social institution". On the other hand, Sita Ram, author of the Vaishnava history of Ayodhya, and George Grierson, eminent linguist and Indologist, represent Ramananda as a saint who tried to transcend caste divisions of medieval India through the message of love and equality. The scholars also disagree on Ramananda's connection with Ramanuja. While Farquhar finds them completely unconnected, Sita Ram and Grierson finds Ramananda's connection with the Ramanuja tradition. This question got settled during the Ujjain Kumbh in 1921, where Bhagavadacharya, arguing the Ramanandi case, won over Swami Ramprapann Ramanujadas. The jury declared the sampradaya independent of Ramanuja and the Sri Vaishnavas.

The Ramanandi Sampradaya as a sect unto itself only gained prominence at the close of the 17th century, though Rama bhaktas existed as members of Vaishnava traditions like the Sri Vaishnava Sampradaya long beforehand. The Sampradaya's rise may have been a gradual process, preceded by various earlier paramparas, such as the Rasika schools. While they had a presence across Northern India, the Ramanandi Sampradaya found particularly strong support in Rajasthan, which became the sect's primary region during this time. The Galata monastery in particular was one of the most important early centres of Rama bhakti. About 100 kilometres northwest of Galata, the Raivasa gaddi in Shekhavati, one of the first Ramaite communities, is said to have been founded by Agradasa.

The period spanning the late 17th century and early 18th century was marked by increased religious intolerance and economic turmoil, coinciding with the reign of Emperor Aurangzeb. The state of affairs would further decline with the death of Aurangzeb and the beginning of a civil war between his sons, throwing the Mughal Empire into turmoil. In this atmosphere, the various Hindu ascetic sects began to take up arms to defend their holy sites and the revenues from pilgrims' fees and donations that could be gained from them. Tensions between various religious sects, which had already been growing since even before Aurangzeb's reign, worsened significantly due to the general state of anarchy. These groups would soon come into armed conflict with each other over control of pilgrimage routes and pilgrimage centres. In the early 18th century, on the day of Ramanavami, Gosains of the Dasnami sect of Sannyasis encircled and captured the city of Ayodhya from the Ramanandi vairagis. Violence like this was not unique to just pilgrimage sites, and also occurred at fairs and on Kumbh Mela. The terror evoked by the attacks on Vaishnavas across India created a fear among Vaishnavites of the time that the Vaishnava religion might disappear. The losses against the Shaiva Dasnamis and Gosains led to Balananda, the then Ramanandi acharya of Jaipur, and Vrindavanadeva, an acharya of the Nimbarka Sampradaya, to jointly convene Vaishnavas of all four Sampradayas together at Galata under the auspices of Raja Jai Singh to organise themselves into military orders called akhara.

At the conference at Galata, Balananda was entrusted with the organisation of military sections of the participating Vaishnava sects. For his role in protecting the Ramanandi Sampradaya, Balananda became revered in the sect as an incarnation of Hanuman. Burghart notes that "at the Galata conference the Ramanandis displaced the Sri sect and were recognized as the original members of the catuh sampradaya together with the sects founded by Nimbarka, Madhvacharya, and Visnusvami". In this way, the Galata conference served as a turning point for the Ramanandi Sampradaya. The first akhara belonging to the Ramanandi branch to be established in Ayodhya was founded at Ramghat by Govindadasa shortly after the conference. The Vaishnavas for a time after this were able to defeat the Dashnami Gosains in various conflicts as a result of the formation of these new Vaishnavite akharas. The conflict between the Shaivite Gosains and the Vaishnavite Bairagis was by no means concluded, however, and bloodshed at the hands of both groups would continue for the rest of the century, especially during Kumbh Mela. A copperplate of 1813 from the Peshwa court records a battle between Bairagis and Sannyasis at the 1789 Nashik Kumbh and orders the two groups to bathe at separate sites from 1801.

Up to the nineteenth century, many of the trade routes in northern India were guarded by groups of warrior-ascetics, including the Nāgā sections of the Rāmānandīs, who were feared because of their strength and fearlessness. The British took steps to disarm these militant groups of ascetics, but even today the sects still retain their heroic traditions.

The Ramanandi Sampradaya is considered one of the largest and most egalitarian Hindu sects in India, around the Gangetic Plain, and Nepal.

== Geography ==
Ramanandis live chiefly in the northern part of India. Ramanandi monasteries are found throughout northern, western and central India, the Ganges basin, the Nepalese Terai, and the Himalayan foothills. Wandering Ramanandi renouncers spend about eight months of the year on a circuit of Vaishnava pilgrimage centres and festivals across Northern India and Nepal. The Cāturmās or the four month period from roughly mid-July through mid-November is spent at any local monastery that holds enough grain to feed them.

Ramanandis are spread across India, mainly in Jammu, Punjab, Himachal, Gujarat, Uttar Pradesh, Madhya Pradesh, Rajasthan, Odisha, Assam and West Bengal. The majority of Hindu immigrants to Trinidad and Tobago as well as substantial section of Hindus in United Kingdom of Great Britain belong to Vaishnava sects such as the Ramanandi. Ramanandis have a major influence on the mainstream Sanatani (orthodox) sect of Hinduism in Trinidad and Tobago.

== Beliefs and practices ==
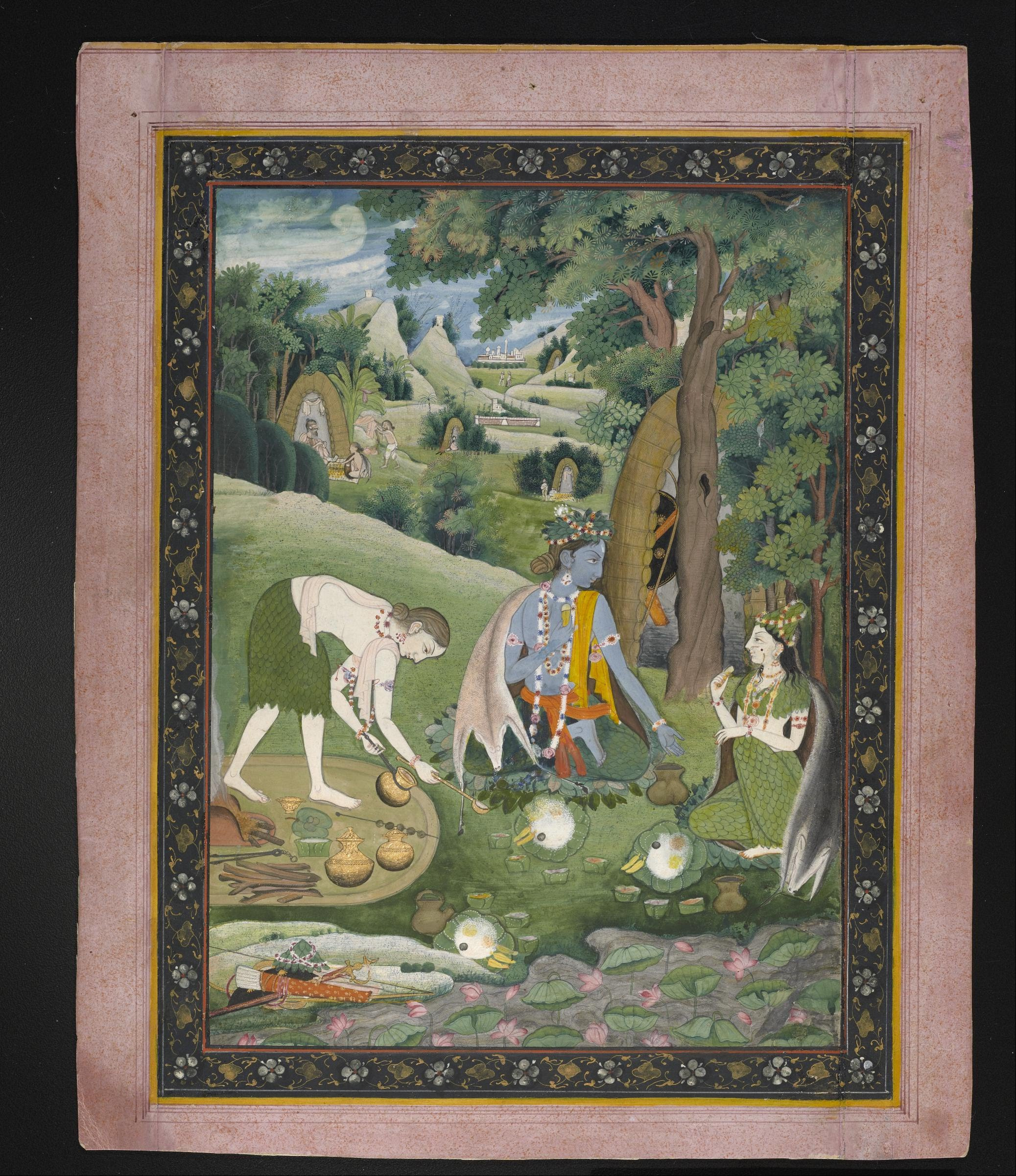
Rama, Sita, and Lakshmana cooking and eating in the Wilderness (picture).

Ramanandis worship Rama as their principal deity, along with Sita, Lakshmana, and Hanuman. Vishnu is also worshiped and other incarnations. (Note: Michaels (2004, p. 255): "many groups that are considered Vaiṣṇava also worship Śiva. The largest ascetic groups that celebrate the Śivaratri festival with mortification of the flesh and pilgrimages are the Vaiṣṇava Rāmānandīs.") Ramanandi ascetics rely upon meditation and strict ascetic practices, but also believe that the grace of god is required for them to achieve liberation. For that reason, the Tyāga section of the Ramanandi ascetics, unlike some Shaiva ascetics, does not cut the sacred thread. Their reasoning for this is that only Vishnu or Rama can grant liberation. A sadhu drops his birth name and clan name at initiation for a religious name and takes up the achyut-gotra (the clan-name of God).

Most Ramanandis consider themselves to be the followers of Ramananda, a Vaishnava saint in medieval India. Philosophically, they follow the Vishishtadvaita (IAST Viśiṣṭādvaita) tradition.

Its ascetic wing constitutes the largest Vaishnava monastic order. Ramdas Lamb estimates its renunciants to be nearly 1.5 million, the making it the largest Hindu ascetic order.

There are two major subgroups of Ramanandi ascetics: the Tyagi, who are ascetics, and the Naga, who are the militant wing. Tyagis wear matted hair smeared with ash, sit by a sacred fire (dhuni) and tend to live as wanderers. They sit ringed by fires under the sun to build up tapas, and say that it is chiefly meditation on the name of Rama that sets them apart from Shaiva ascetics. The Nagas are grouped into regiments (akhara) who wrestle and armies (ani) who train with weapons.

In his fieldwork at Ayodhya, Peter van der Veer identified a third group, the rasiks, who favour devotional worship of Rama and Sita over ascetic practice. Rasiks treat Sita as Rama's equal, and van der Veer attributes their style to the Krishna devotion of Braj, which he says brought about a "Krishnaisation" of Rama worship.

== Saints ==
Saints Dhanna and Pipa were among the immediate disciples of Ramananda. Hymns written by them find mention in the Adi Granth, holy scripture of the Sikhs. Sects founded by saints Raidas, Sena and Maluk Das are also of a direct Ramanandi origin.

The poet-saint Tulsidas, who composed the Ramcharitmanas, was a member of this sect. His writings are regarded to have made Vishnu and Shiva devotees of each other and thereby bridged the gap between Vaishnavas and Shaivas. Because Tulsidas attempted to reconcile various theologies scholars like Ramchandra Shukla do not agree that he can be considered to be a Ramanandi exclusively.

Some sources say Jayadeva, who composed the Gita Govinda, was also a member of this sect. Other sources classify Jayadeva simply as a Bengali Vaishnava. Jayadeva's verses also appear in the Adi Granth.

Kabir was also disciple of Ramananda and part of Ramanandi Sampradaya, Kabir's disciples, Surat Gopal and Dharamdas also founded a separate sect that is now known as the Kabirpanthi. Compositions by Kabir are included in the Adi Granth, the holy scripture of the Sikhs.

Another bhakti saint, Ravidas, who was also a disciple of Ramananda, followed Ramanandi Sampradaya. Ravidas's poetry features prominently in the Sikh scripture.

Bhaktamal, a poem written c. 1585 in Braj language, gives short biographies of more than 200 bhaktas. It was written by Nabha Dass, a saint belonging to the tradition of Ramananda. It also extols the piety of Ramanandi saint Bhagwan and miraculous powers of his disciple Narain, who founded the Ramanandi Vaishnav temple named Thakurdwara Bhagwan Narainji in Pandori dham in Gurdaspur, Punjab.

== Lineage of Ramanandi Sampradaya ==
The lineage of Ramanandi Sampradaya is claimed to start from Rama, The lineage as said by Anantanandacharya to Krishnadas Payahari is:

- Rama
- Sita
- Hanuman
- Brahma
- Vasishtha
- Parashara
- Vyasa
- Shuka
- Purushottamacharya
- Gangadharacharya
- Sadaanandacharya
- Rameshvaranandacharya
- Dvaranandacharya
- Devanandacharya
- Shyamanandacharya
- Shrutanandacharya
- Chidanandacharya
- Purnanandacharya
- Shriyanandacharya
- Haryanandacharya
- Raghavananadacharya
- Ramanandacharya

== Image gallery ==
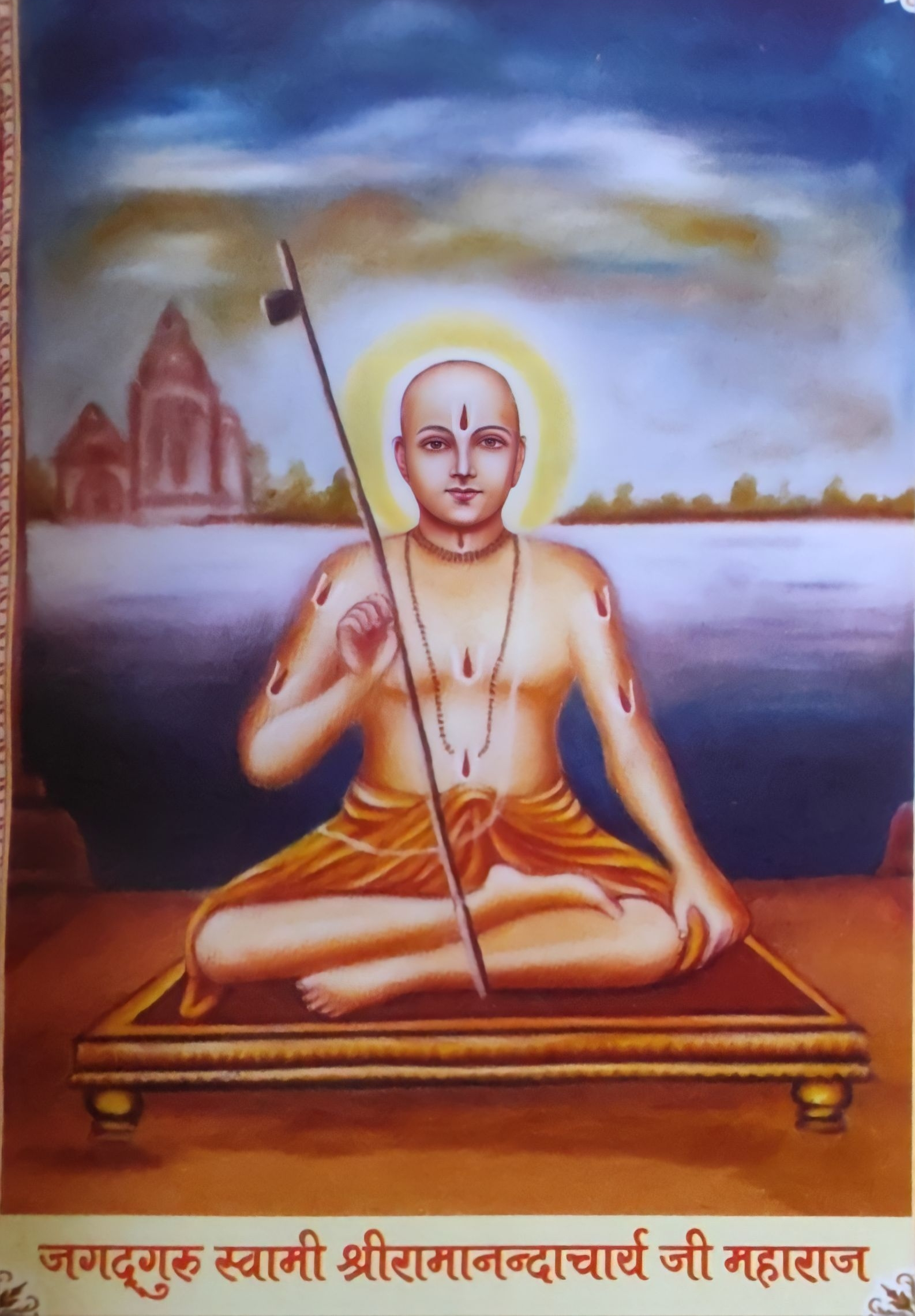
Ramananda, the founder of the sampraday

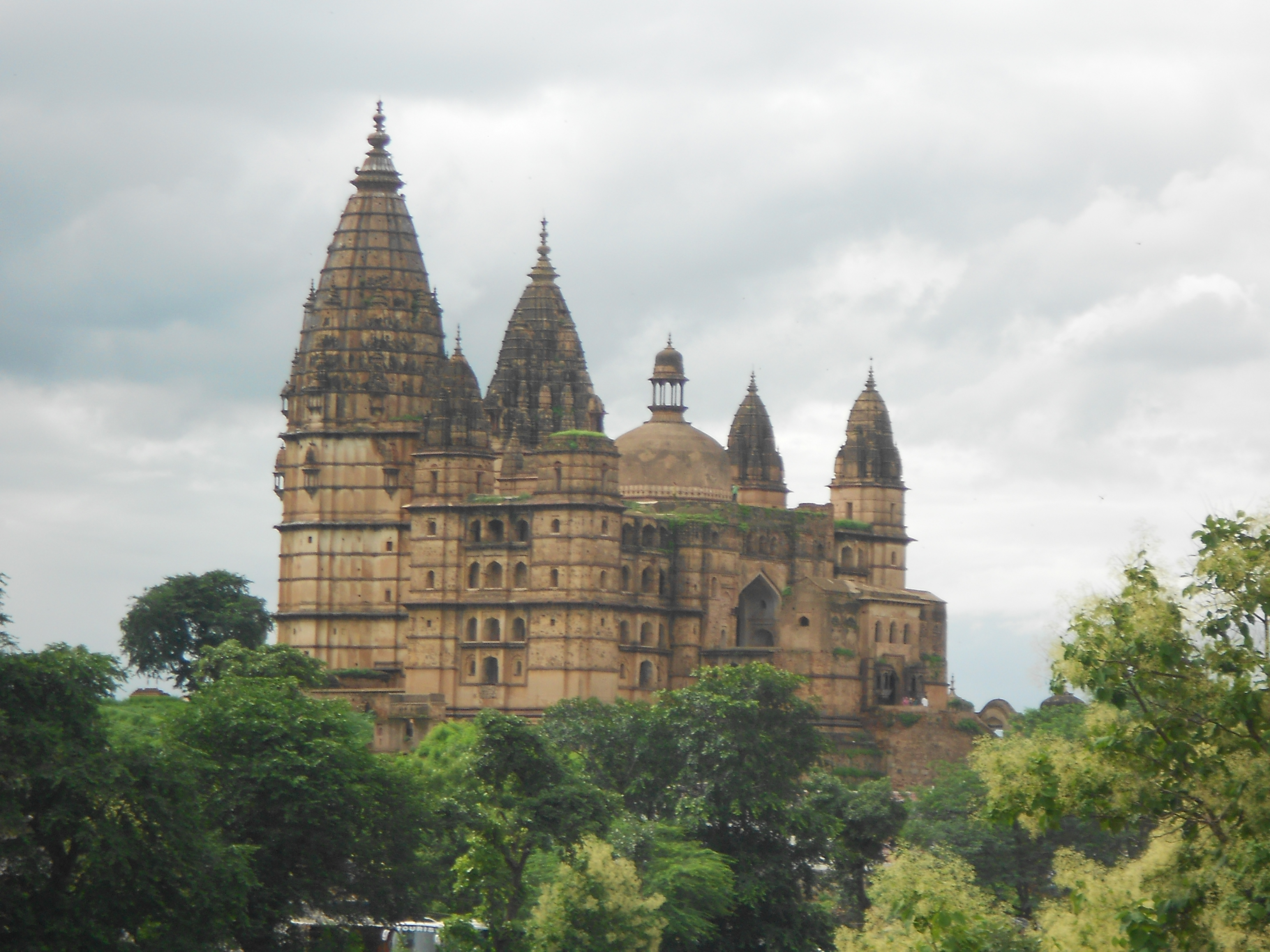
Rama's Chaturbhuj Temple (Orchha) (Madhya Pradesh)

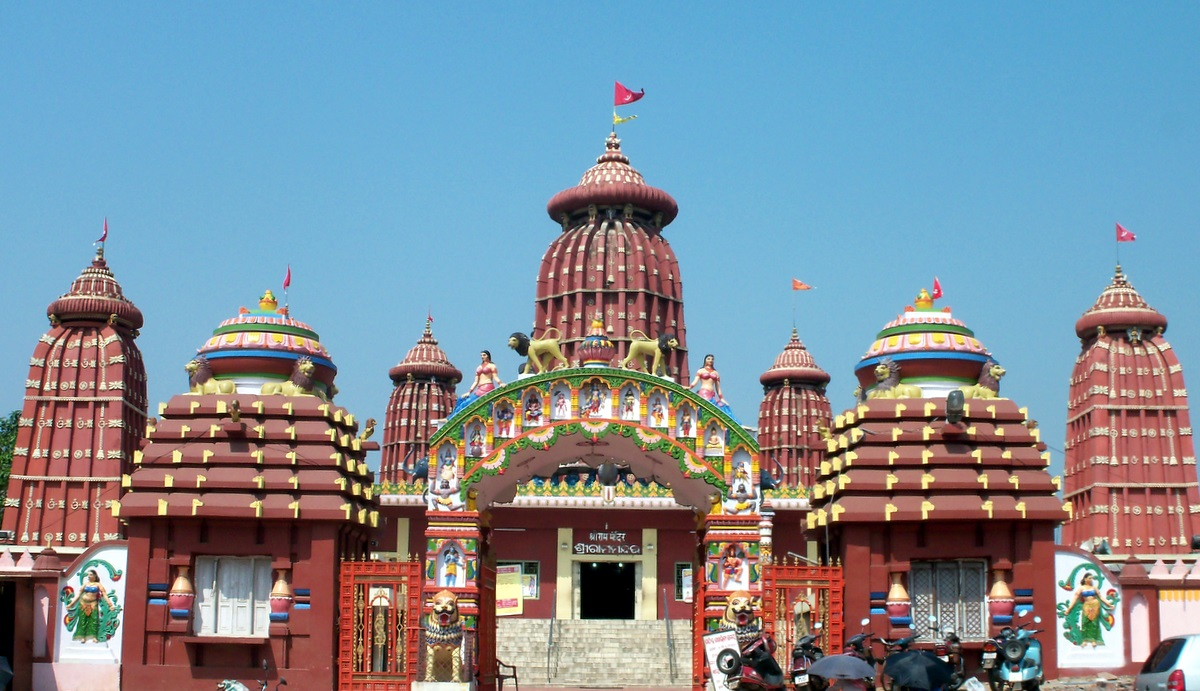
Ram Mandir, Bhubaneswar (Orisha)

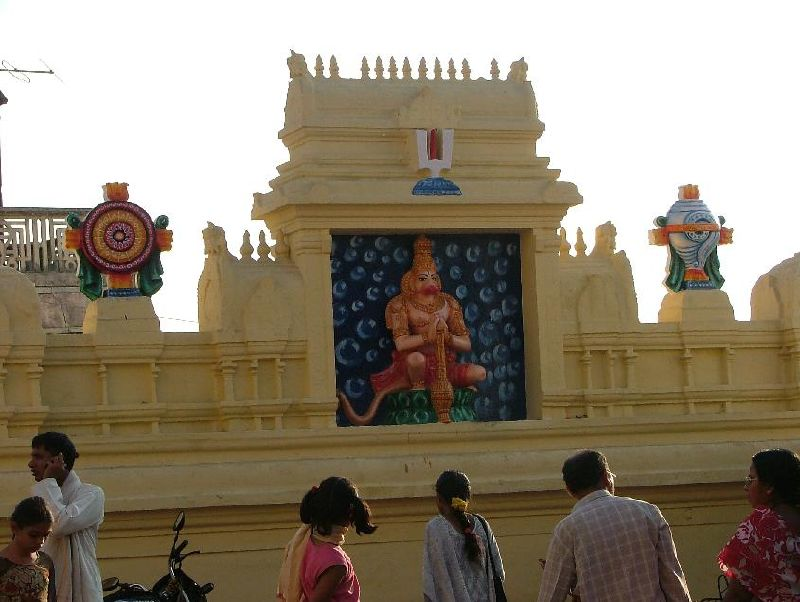
Hanuman at the entrance of Sita Ramachandraswamy temple, Bhadrachalam (Telangana)

== See also ==
- Bairagi Brahmin
- Bhakti movement
- Balmiki sect
- Hindu denominations
- Maithili Maha Upanishad
- Rambhadracharya
- Ramarchana Paddhati
- Thakurdwara Bhagwan Narainji
- Vaishnava Matabja Bhaskara
- Valmiki Samhita
- Baba Ram Thaman Shrine

== Sources ==
- Burghart, Richard (May 1983), "Wandering Ascetics of the Rāmānandī Sect", History of Religions, 22 (4), The University of Chicago Press: 361–80, doi:10.1086/462930, S2CID 162304284
- Callewaert, Winand M.; Snell, Rupert (1994), According to Tradition: Hagiographical Writing in India, Otto Harrassowitz Verlag, ISBN 978-3-447-03524-8
- Farquhar, J. N. (1920), Outline of the Religious Literature of India, Motilal Banarsidass, ISBN 978-81-208-2086-9
- Jaffrelot, Christophe (2003), India's silent revolution: the rise of the lower castes in North India, London: C. Hurst & Co., p. 196, ISBN 978-1-85065-670-8
- Lamb, Ramdas (2008), "Devotion, Renunciation, and Rebirth in the Ramananda Sampraday", CrossCurrents, 57 (4): 578–590, JSTOR 24461393Merriam-Webster's Encyclopedia of World Religions, Merriam-Webster, 1999, ISBN 978-0-87779-044-0
- Michaels, Alex (2004), Hinduism: Past and Present (English translation of the book first published in Germany under the title Der Hinduismus: Geschichte und Gegenwart (Verlag, 1998) ed.), Princeton: Princeton University Press, ISBN 0-691-08952-3
- Pinch, William R. (1996), Peasants and Monks in British India, University of California Press, ISBN 978-0-520-20061-6
- Raj, Selva J.; Harman, William P. (2007), Dealing With Deities: The Ritual Vow in South Asia, SUNY Press, ISBN 978-0-7914-6708-4
- Schomer, Karine; McLeod, W. H. (1987), The Sants: Studies in a Devotional Tradition of India, Motilal Banarsidass, ISBN 978-81-208-0277-3
- Shukla, Usha Devi (2002), Rāmacaritamānasa in South Africa, Motilal Banarsidass, ISBN 978-81-208-1893-4
- Tattwananda, Swami (1984), Vaisnava Sects, Saiva Sects, Mother Worship (1st revised ed.), Calcutta: Firma KLM Private Ltd., p. 10
- van der Veer, Peter (December 1987), "Taming the Ascetic: Devotionalism in a Hindu Monastic Order", Man, New Series, 22 (4): 680–695, doi:10.2307/2803358, hdl:1874/7100, JSTOR 2803358West, Jacqueline (2001), South America, Central America and the Caribbean 2002, Psychology Press, ISBN 978-1-85743-121-6
- Pande, Rekha (2010), Divine Sounds from the Heart—Singing Unfettered in their Own Voices: The Bhakti Movement and its Women Saints (12th to 17th Century), Cambridge Scholars Publishing, pp. 76–77, ISBN 9781443825252
- Lochtefeld, James G. (2001), The Illustrated Encyclopedia of Hinduism: A-M, New York, New York, United States of America: Rosen Publishing Group, p. 451, ISBN 9780823931798
- Jha, Mamta (2013), Sant Ravidas Ratnawali, Prabhat Prakashan, p. 12
