= HFA =

HFA may stand for:

== Arts and entertainment ==
- Harry Fox Agency, a provider of rights management for music publishers in the US
- High-fidelity audio, a quality of sound reproduction
- The High Fructose Adventures of Annoying Orange, a US television show

== Chemistry ==
- Hexafluoroacetone, a colorless gas
- Hydrofluoroalkane, a refrigerant chosen to replace Freon-12

== Schools ==
- Henry Ford Academy, a charter school in the US
- Holy Family Academy (Philippines), a Catholic educational institution in Angeles City
- Hume-Fogg High School, in Nashville, Tennessee, US

== Other uses ==
- Haifa Airport, in Haifa, Israel (IATA code HFA)
- High-functioning alcoholic, a person that maintains jobs and relationships while exhibiting alcoholism
- High-functioning autism
- Hillary for America, the name of Hillary Rodham Clinton's campaign committee in the 2016 U.S. presidential election
- Hope to the Future Association, in Seoul, South Korea.
- Humphrey field analyser, a tool for measuring the human visual field
- Hyogo Framework for Action, a United Nations ten-year plan for disaster resilience
- New York State Housing Finance Agency
