= Nai (caste) =

Occupational community of barbers in India

Nai/Sen
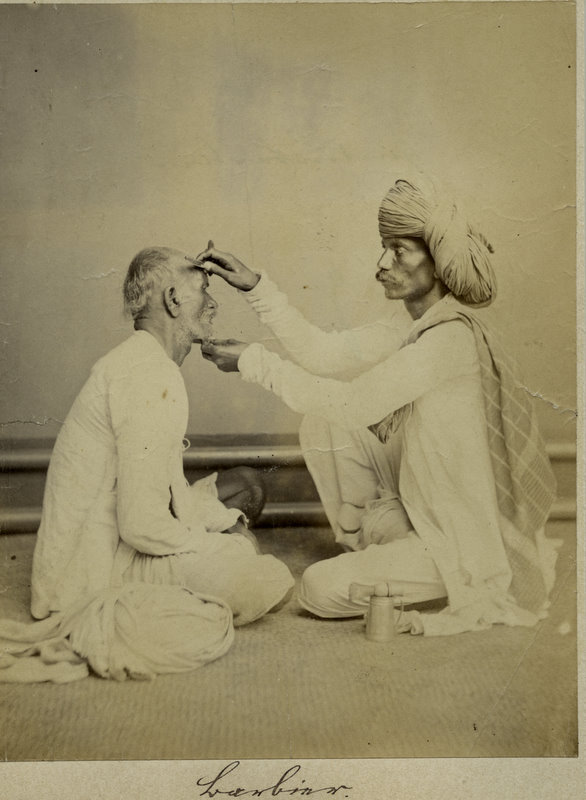
- Nai (barber) doing his work (c. 1870s)

Regions with significant populations
- Primary populations in: Punjab; Goa; Maharashtra; Karnataka; Bihar; Uttar Pradesh; Andhra Pradesh; Assam; Chandigarh; Odisha; Gujarat; Madhya Pradesh

Religion
- Hinduism; Sikhism; Islam

Nai, also known as Sain, is a generic term for occupational castes of barbers. The name is said to be derived from the Sanskrit word nāpita (नापित). In modern times Nai in northern India refer to themselves as "Sain" instead of Nai.

The Nai caste is classified as an Other Backward Class in most of the state in India. These include Andhra Pradesh, Assam, Bihar, Chandigarh, Chhattisgarh, Dadra and Nagar Haveli, Daman and Diu, Delhi NCR, Goa, Gujarat, Haryana, Himachal Pradesh, Goa, Jharkhand, Karnataka, Madhya Pradesh, Maharashtra, Odisha, Puducherry, Punjab, Rajasthan, Tripura, Uttaranchal, Uttar Pradesh, and West Bengal, where they have their own regional name and endogamous unit.

Some Nais are followers of Sikhism. Their traditional roles were cutting hair and taking messages on life-cycle rituals celebrated by members of other caste groups.

== Origin ==
=== Puranic view ===
According to a legend prevalent among Nais, they are descended from Nabhi, who in puranic literature is king of the Ikshvaku dynasty.

=== Other views ===
In Tamil region some members of the barber caste practiced medicine and used to be called Ambathan.

== Occupation ==
The traditional occupation of Nais is barbering. They also perform the work of match-making for marriages. The educated people among the community have taken up various other occupations like business and service.

== Impact of the ideas of Sain ==
The process of the Nais adopting the ideas and teachings of Bhagat Sain can be conceptualized as Sainization, depicted through deifying Sain by setting up the institution of Sainacharya. Sain, who was the contemporaries of Kabir, the Bhakti poet who challenged the hegemonic values and hierarchy of the caste system, has become the most revered symbol of pride and identity formation of the Nais. In order to assert their cultural autonomy in 1992 Akhil Bharatiya Sain Bhaktipith Trust was set up on the occasion of the Ujjain mahakumbh mela headed in Pushkar. Achlanandji Maharaj was made the first Sainacharya.

== Attempts for upward mobility ==
During the British period, the Nais tried to raise their social status by claiming themselves as Thakurs in 1921 census and Brahmins in 1931 census. The members of the caste pleaded that their caste be named as "Nai Brahmin" in 1941 census. Such attempts by relatively lower castes to lay claim on higher varna status is termed as Sanskritisation.

== Notable people ==
- Bhagat Sain, Saint and Bhakti poet
- Sahib Singh, one of the Panj Pyare
- Bhikhari Thakur, Bhojpuri poet
- Karpoori Thakur, Former Chief Minister of Bihar
