= Seether (disambiguation) =

Seether is a South African rock band.

Seether may refer to:

- "Seether" (song), a 1994 single by Veruca Salt
- Seether, character in video game Wing Commander IV: The Price of Freedom

== See also ==
- Sita (disambiguation)
