= Gokulathil Seethai =

Gokulathil Seethai (lit. 'Sita in Gokul' in Tamil) may refer to:

- Gokulathil Seethai (film), a 1996 Indian Tamil film by Agathiyan
- Gokulathil Seethai (2008 TV series), an Indian TV series on Kalaignar TV
- Gokulathil Seethai (2019 TV series), an Indian TV series on Zee Tamil

== See also ==
- Gokul (disambiguation)
- Sita (disambiguation)
- Gokulamlo Seeta, a 1997 Indian Telugu film by Mutyala Subaiya
