= Ramarchana Paddhati =

Hindu text venerating Rama

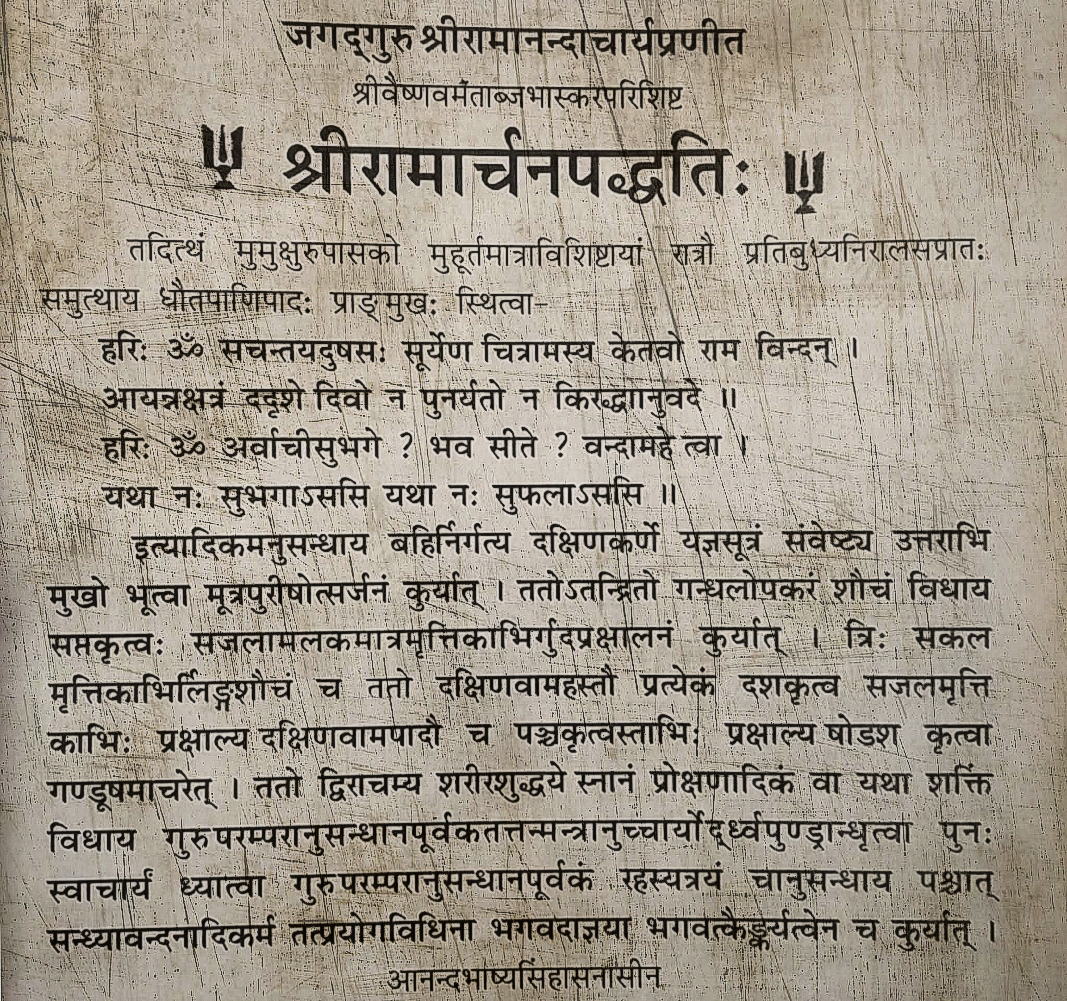
- First page of the Ramarchana Paddhati

Information
- Religion: Hinduism
- Author: Ramananda
- Language: Sanskrit

The Ramarchana Paddhati (Sanskrit: रामार्चनपद्धति, romanized: rāmārcanapaddhati) is a Sanskrit text attributed to Ramananda.

== Description ==
According to Ramanandi tradition, Ramananda transmitted this text to Anantananda and Surasurananda. After a benedictory verse that extols the gurus of the tradition, the text prescribes the modes of worship of Rama. It describes the procedure for performing the murti puja of the deity (icon veneration), purification rites, and obligatory daily rites (nityakarma).

== See also ==
- Vaishnava Matabja Bhaskara
- Valmiki Samhita
- Maithili Maha Upanishad
