= Ramananda =

14th century poet-saint from India

Jagadguru Swami Ramananda Acharya
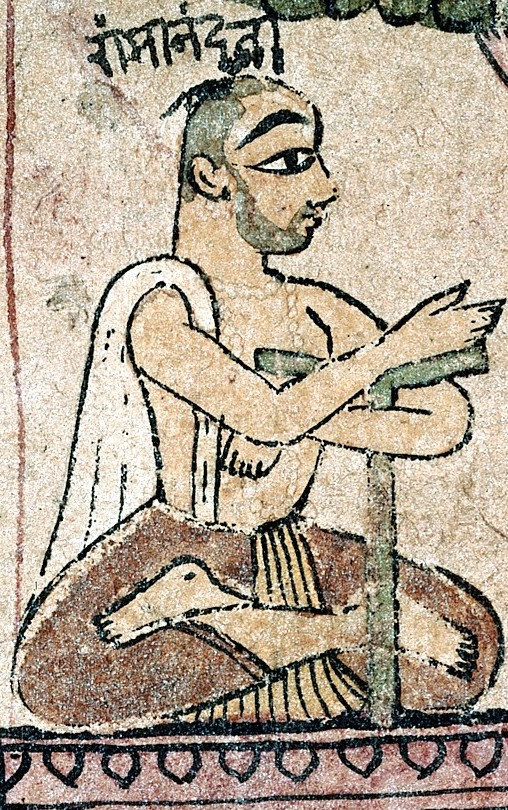
- Illustration depicting Ramananda, c. 1715

Personal life
- Born: 30 December, ~1400 CEl Prayagraj, Delhi Sultanate (present-day Uttar Pradesh, India)
- Died: uncertain date, ~1400-1475 CE Banaras, Delhi Sultanate (present-day Varanasi, Uttar Pradesh, India)
- Known for: Founder of Bairagi Ramanandi Sampradaya; Guru of Major Poet-saints; A Pioneer of Bhakti movement in north India; Social Reformer

Religious life
- Religion: Hinduism
- Philosophy: Vishishtadvaita
- Sect: Ramanandi Sampradaya

Religious career
- Teacher: Raghavananda
- Disciples: 2 poetess-sants and 10 poet-sants including Kabir, Ravidas, Pipa, Dhanna, and Surasurananda
- Influenced by: Ramanuja
- Influenced: Tulsidas, Nabha Dass, Krishnadas Payahari, Kilhadev

Jagadguru Swami Ramananda (IAST: Rāmānanda) or Ramanandacharya was an Indian 14th-century Hindu Vaishnava devotional poet saint, who lived in the Gangetic basin of northern India. The Hindu tradition recognizes him as the founder of the Ramanandi Sampradaya, the largest monastic Hindu renunciant community in modern times.

Born in a Kanyakubja Brahmin family, Ramananda for the most part of his life lived in the holy city of Varanasi. His date of birth is 30 December, while his date of death is uncertain, but historical evidence suggests he was one of the earliest saints and a pioneering figure of the Bhakti movement as it rapidly grew in North India, sometime between the 14th and mid-15th century during its Islamic rule period. Tradition asserts that Ramananda developed his philosophy and devotional themes inspired by the south Indian Vedanta philosopher Ramanuja, however, evidence also suggests that Ramananda was influenced by Nathpanthi ascetics of the Yoga school of Hindu philosophy.

An early social reformer, Ramananda accepted disciples without discriminating against anyone by gender, class or caste. Traditional scholarship holds that his disciples included later Bhakti movement poet-sants such as Kabir, Ravidas, Bhagat Pipa and others, however, some postmodern scholars have questioned some of this spiritual lineage while others have supported this lineage with historical evidence. His verse is mentioned in the Sikh holy scripture Guru Granth Sahib.

Ramananda was known for composing his works and discussing spiritual themes in vernacular Hindi, stating that this makes knowledge accessible to the masses.

== Biography ==
Little is known with certainty about the life of Ramananda, including year of birth and death The Encyclopaedia of Indian Literature give dates of 1366–1467 for his lifespan. His biography has been derived from mentions of him in secondary literature and inconsistent hagiographies.

The most accepted version holds that Ramananda was born in a Kanyakubja Brahmin family, about mid 14th-century, and died about mid 15th-century. Although few people hold him to be of southern origin, there's no evidence to support such a claim. In fact, all genuinely Indian sources agree in stating that Ramananda was born at Prayaga (Allahabad).

"Not one word is said as to his southern origin, and the fact that he was stated to be a Kanyakubja Brahmin is decisively against such a theory" –George A. Greirson (1920).

According to the medieval era Bhaktamala text by Nabhadas, Ramananda studied under Raghavananda, a guru (teacher) in Vedanta-based Vatakalai (northern, Rama-avatar) school of Vaishnavism.

"It was Ramananda's teacher, Raghavananda, who came from the South, and after much wandering had settled at Benares. There, and not in the South, he had Ramananda as his disciple." –George A. Greirson (1920).

Other scholars state that Ramananda's education started in Adi Shankara's Advaita Vedanta school, before he met Raghavananda and began his studies in Ramanuja's Vishishtadvaita Vedanta school.

== Literary works ==
Ramananda is credited as the author of many devotional poems, but like most Bhakti movement poets, whether he actually was the author of these poems is unclear. Two treatises in Hindi, Gyan-lila and Yog-cintamani are also attributed to Ramananda, as are the Sanskrit works Vaishnava Matabja Bhaskara and the Ramarchana Paddhati. His three other literatures: Brahm Sutra Anandbhashya, Upanishad Anandbhashya, and Shrimad Bhagwadgita Anandbhshya are also famous. However, poems found in the original and well-preserved manuscripts of Sikhism and handwritten Nagari-pracarini Sabha are considered authentic and highlight the Nirguna (attributeless god) stream of thought in Ramananda.

== Philosophy ==
Ramananda developed his philosophy and devotional themes inspired by the south Indian Vedanta philosopher Ramanuja, however, evidence also suggests that Ramananda was influenced by Nathpanthi ascetics of the Yoga school of Hindu philosophy.

Antonio Rigopoulos states Ramananda's teachings were "an attempt towards a synthesis between Advaita Vedanta and Vaishnava bhakti". He adds that the same link can be found in the 15th-century text of Adhyatma Ramayana, but there is no historical proof that Ramananda's teachings inspired that text.

Shastri has proposed the theory that Ramananda's complex theological schooling in two distinct Hindu philosophies explains why he accepted both Saguna Brahman and Nirguna Brahman, or god with attributes and god without attributes, respectively. Shastri suggests his theory offers an explanation why Ramananda's disciples co-developed saguna and nirguna as the two parallel currents in the Bhakti movement. However, this theory lacks historical evidence and has not gained wide acceptance by scholars.

The Ramananda literature that is considered authentic, states Enzo Turbiani, suggest a milestone development in metaphysical principles of the Bhakti movement. Ramananda asserts that austerity and penances through asceticism are meaningless, if an individual does not realize Hari (Vishnu) as their inner self. He criticizes fasting and rituals, stating that the mechanics are not important, and that these are useless if the individual does not take the opportunity to reflect and introspect on the nature of Brahman (supreme being). Ramananda states that rote reading of a sacred text is of no benefit, if the person fails to understand what the text is trying to communicate.

== Legacy ==
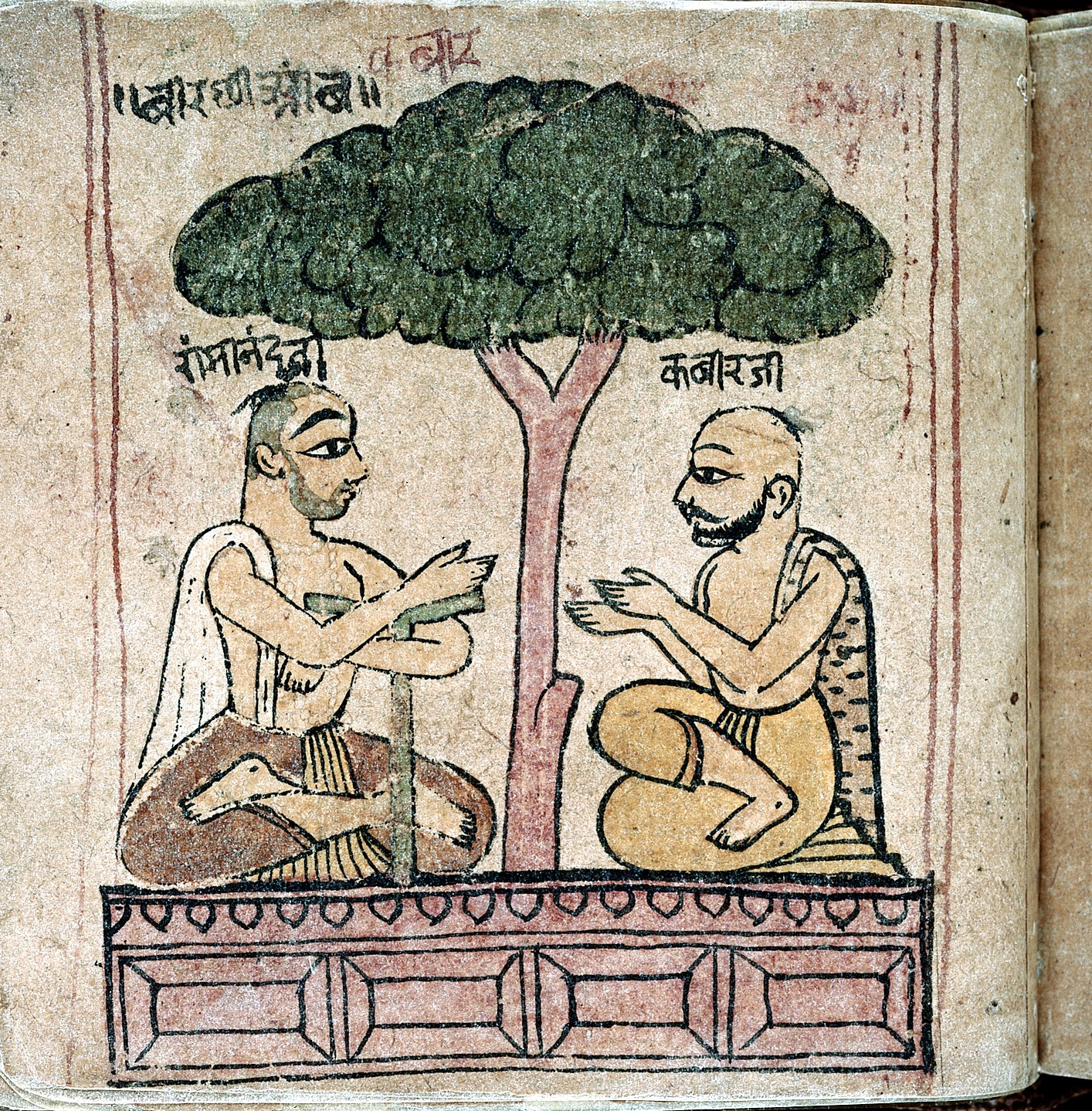
Illustrated manuscript depiction of Ramananda and Kabir

Ramananda is often honored as the founder of Sant-parampara (literally, the tradition of bhakti sants) in north India. His efforts, in a time when Ganges river plains of north India was under Islamic rule, helped revive and refocus Hindus to a personalized, direct devotional form of Rama worship, his liberalism and focus on the devotee's commitment rather than birth or gender set a precedent that attracted people to spirituality from various walks of life, and his use of vernacular language instead of Sanskrit for spiritual ideas made sharing and reflection easier for the masses.

=== Fourteen disciples of Ramananda ===
Fourteen influential disciples of Ramananda included 12 men and 2 women poet-sants. According to Bhaktamal, these were:

Men scholars:

1. Anantananda
2. Sursurananda
3. Sukhanand
4. Naraharidāsa
5. Bhavanand
6. Vitthalpant Kulkarni
7. Bhagat Pipa
8. Kabir
9. Ravidas
10. Sen
11. Dhanna
12. Sadhana

Women scholars:

1. Sursuri
2. Padyawati

Postmodern scholars have questioned some of the above guru-disciple lineage while others have supported this lineage with historical evidence.

=== Largest ascetic community in India: Ramanandi Sampraday ===
Ramananda is the founder of the eponymous Ramanandi Sampraday (Shri Ramavat or Shri Sampraday or Vairagi Sampradaya). This is the largest ascetic community in India, and their members are known as Ramanandis, Vairagis or Bairagis. They are known for their self-imposed highly disciplined, austere, structured and simple lifestyle. Richard Burghart acknowledges that Ramananda is revered as the founder in the Ramanandi Sampraday's tradition, but adds that historical evidence about its origin is meager and India's largest monastic community may have gathered strength a few centuries after Ramananda's death.

=== Social reforms ===
Ramananda was an influential social reformer of Northern India. He championed the pursuit of knowledge and direct devotional spirituality, and did not discriminate based on birth family, gender or religion.

According to legend, 5-year-old Kabir Saheb claimed Ramanand as his guru, despite being from a low-caste weaver family. This encounter led to Ramanand abandoning his practice of untouchability.

=== Swami Ramanand poem ===
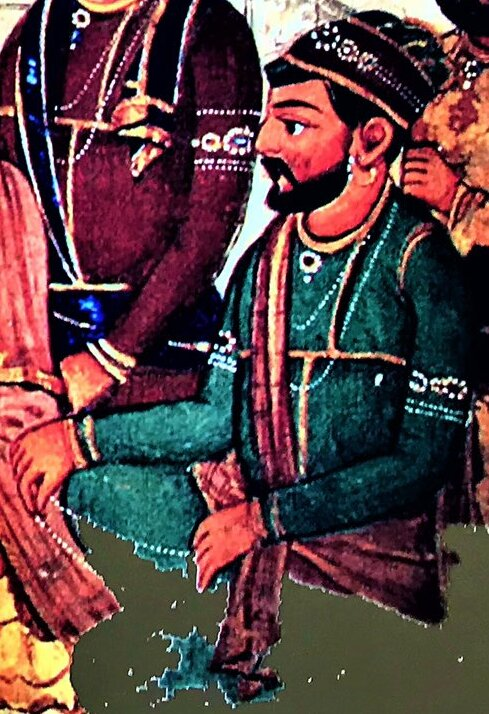
Detail of Bhagat Ramananda from a mural at Gurdwara Baba Atal in Amritsar, circa 19th century

One poem of Ramananda, originally written in Hindi, is a response to an invitation to go to a temple, and the answer states there is no need to visit a temple because God is within a person, all pervasive in everything and everyone.

Where should I go?
I am happy at home.
My heart will not go with me,
My mind has become crippled.

One day, a desire welled up in my mind,
I ground up sandalwood, along with several fragrant oils.
I went to the temple, to worship Him there,
Then my Guru showed me Brahman [Ultimate Reality, God], within my heart.

Wherever I go, I find only water and stones,
But Brahman is in everything.
I have searched through all the Vedas and the Puranas,
You go there, only if Brahman were not here.

I am a sacrifice to You, O True Guru.
You have dispelled all my confusion and doubt.
Ramanand's Lord is the all-pervading Brahman,
The word of the Guru ends millions of karma.

— Ramananda in Raag Basant, Adi Granth 1995

== See also ==
- Bhakti movement
- Ramanandi Sampradaya
- Goswami Nabha Das
- Bhaktamala
- Galtaji dham peeth
- Thakurdwara Bhagwan Narainji
- Ravidas
- Kabir
