= Bhagat Sain =

Bhakti saint

Bhagat Sain Bairagi
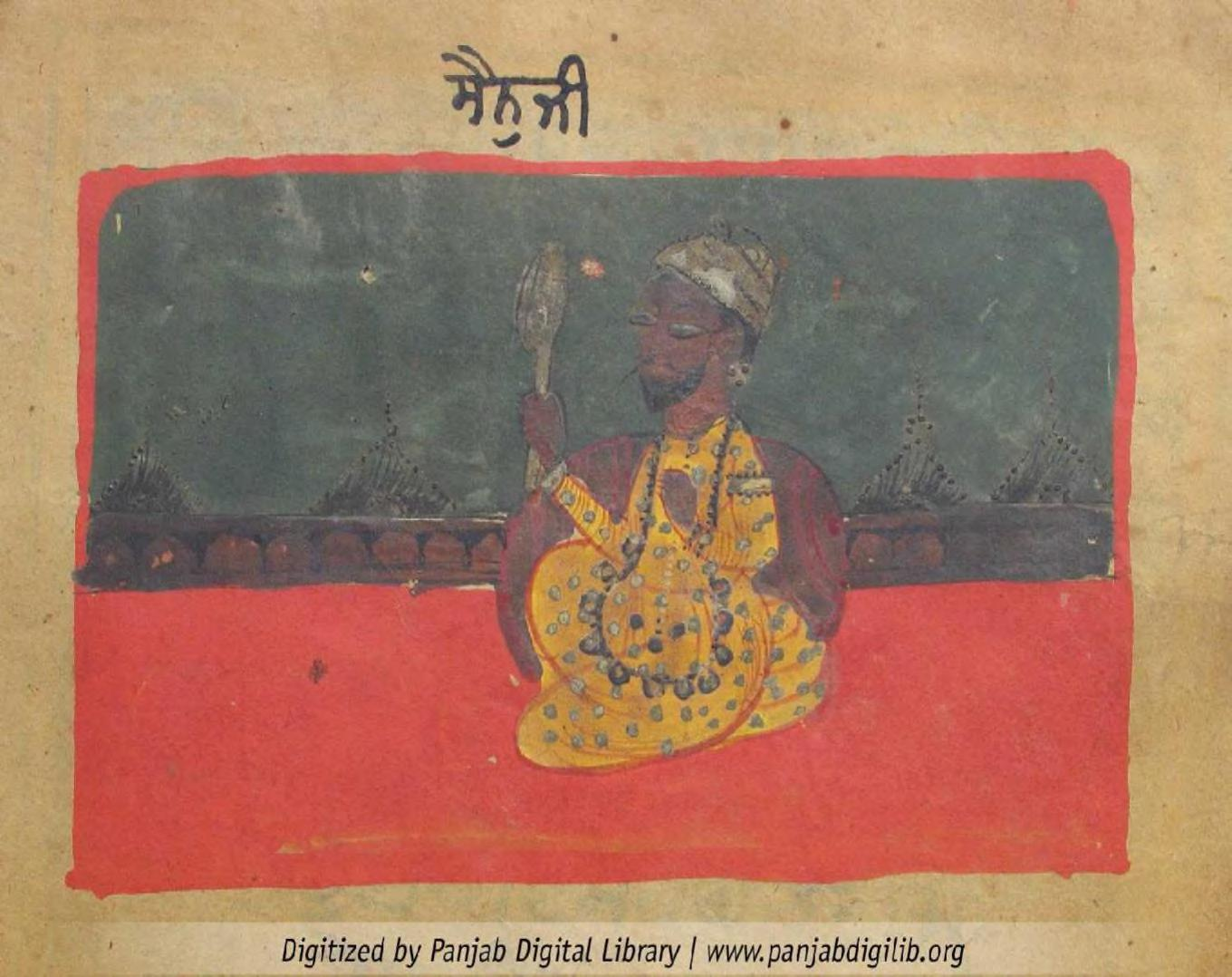
- Painting of Bhagat Sain, from a folio within an illustrated manuscript of the Prem Ambodh Pothi

Personal life
- Born: 1343 disputed. Sohal (Tarn Taran, Punjab), Rewa (Madhya Pradesh) or Maharashtra
- Died: 1440 (aged 96–97) Varanasi
- Spouse: Bibi Sahib Devi
- Children: Bhai Nai
- Parent(s): Baba Mukand Rai; Mata Jivani
- Known for: 1 verse in Guru Granth Sahib
- Occupation: Royal Barber (early life); Saint (later life)

Religious life
- Religion: Hinduism
- Philosophy: Vishishtadvaita
- Sect: Ramanandi Sampradaya

Religious career
- Teacher: Ramananda

Bhagat Sain (fl. 14th–15th centuries), also known as Sena Bhagat, was a Hindu mystic poet and saint of the Bhakti movement that lived in the end of the fourteenth and the beginning of the fifteenth century. His name was known in every house due to his devotion to god. Bhagat Sain was a barber of the royal court of Raja Ram Singh, ruler of Rewa. He was a disciple of Ramananda.

== Birthplace ==
There are four views about his place of birth.

1. One view is that he was born in Maharashtra and served as barber in the court of king of Bidar. The only fact to support this view is existence of many devotional songs in Marathi language in the name of Saint Sain.
2. The second view is that he was born in Rewa in Madhya Pradesh and that he served the King Ram Singh of Bandhavgarh. The third view is that Saint Sain was born in village Sohal in Tarn Taran district of Punjab state. His father's name was Baba Mukhand Rai and mother's name was Mata Jeevne.
3. Another view states he was a barber from Rajasthan.
4. The general view is that he was born in Punjab but toured all over India where he may have served both the kings of Bandhavgarh and Bidar. 6 December is celebrated as his birth anniversary in Punjab. Now a Gurudwara and a holy tank (sarovar) stands on the place where he used to do meditation in Partabpura, Punjab.

== Life ==
The tendency of the age was towards devotion and religious composition, and Sain found leisure in the midst of duties to study the hymns of Ramanand, shape his life on the principles inculcated in them, and successfully imitate their spirit and devotional fervor.

God is said by the Hindu chronicler to have cherished Sain as a cow her calf. He frequented the society of holy men and was very happy in their company. He performed for them all menial offices, for he believed that serving saints was equivalent to serving God himself.

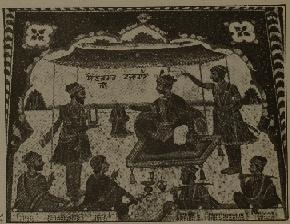
Fresco depicting Bhagat Sain the barber in the court of Raja Ram of Rewa from the original Akal Takht structure

The Bhagat Mal contains a legend which at once illustrates Sain's devotion to saints and the estimation in which he was held for his piety. When going one day to perform his usual ministrations for King Raja Ram, he met some holy men on the way. He thought it was his first duty to attend to them, He took them with him, and began to render them with the customary services. With the greatest mental satisfaction to himself he gave them consecrated and secular food to relieve their souls and bodies. In thus acting Sain disregarded his duty to the king and braved his displeasure. The legend states that a holy man, by God's favor, in order to avert the king's wrath and save Sain from punishment, assumed his appearance, and having gone and performed the customary duties for the king, took his departure. Soon after Sain arrived and began to apologize for the delay. The king said, “Thou hast only just gone after the usual services to me; why apologize?” Sain replied, “ I have not been here. Perhaps thy majesty sayest so to excuse my absence.” The Raja then knew that a special providence had intervened and performed for him the usual tonsorial duties. He was at once converted, fell at Sain's feet, worshipped him as his guru, and thus sought an asylum in God. It had at any rate at the time of the composition of the Bhagat Mal become an established custom that the successive kings of the house of Bandhavgarh should always be disciples of the descendants of Sain. They are now said to be followers of Bhagat Kabir.

Bhai Gurdas in his "vaar" 10 Para 16 has given the story of Saint Sain. He has described that after listening to the glory of saint Kabir, he adopted saint Ramanand as his Guru. After this he gives the story of the saints visiting Sain, their night long kirtan and the lord serving the king as barber assuming Sain's form. There is only one composition of Saint Sain in Sri Guru Granth Sahib on page 695.

== Hymn in Adi Granth ==
In Raag Dhanasari, Bhagat Sain's bani can be found in the following ANG (page) of Guru Granth Sahib:

- Bhagat Sain, pg. 695

Sri Sain
Having made an oblation of incense, lamp, and clarified butter,
I go to offer to Thee, O God.
Hail to Thee, O God, hail!
Ever hail to Thee, O Sovereign God!
Thy name is the best lamp, meditation theron the purest wick;
Thou art alone the Bright One, O God.
It is the saints of God who feel divine pleasure;
They describe Thee as all-pervading and the Supreme Joy.
Thou, of fascinating form, O God, float us over the ocean of terror.
Sain saith, worship the Supreme Joy.

ਸ੍ਰੀ ਸੈਣੁ ॥
श्री सैणु ॥
saree sain.
Sri Sain:

ਧੂਪ ਦੀਪ ਘ੍ਰਿਤ ਸਾਜਿ ਆਰਤੀ ॥
धूप दीप घृत साजि आरती ॥
Dhoop deep gharit saaj aartee.
With incense, lamps and ghee, I offer this lamp-lit worship service.

ਵਾਰਨੇ ਜਾਉ ਕਮਲਾ ਪਤੀ ॥੧॥
वारने जाउ कमला पती ॥१॥
vaarnay jaa-o kamlaa patee. ||1||
I am a sacrifice to the Lord of Lakshmi. ||1||

ਮੰਗਲਾ ਹਰਿ ਮੰਗਲਾ ॥
मंगला हरि मंगला ॥
manglaa har manglaa.
Hail to You, Lord, hail to You!

ਨਿਤ ਮੰਗਲੁ ਰਾਜਾ ਰਾਮ ਰਾਇ ਕੋ ॥੧॥ ਰਹਾਉ ॥
नित मंगलु राजा राम राइ को ॥१॥ रहाउ ॥
nit mangal raajaa raam raa-ay ko. ||1|| rahaa-o.
Again and again, hail to You, Lord King, Ruler of all! ||1||Pause||

ਊਤਮੁ ਦੀਅਰਾ ਨਿਰਮਲ ਬਾਤੀ ॥
ऊतमु दीअरा निरमल बाती ॥
ootam dee-araa nirmal baatee.
Sublime is the lamp, and pure is the wick.

ਤੂੰਹੀ ਨਿਰੰਜਨੁ ਕਮਲਾ ਪਾਤੀ ॥੨॥
तुहीं नरंजनु कमला पाती ॥२॥
tuheeN niranjan kamlaa paatee. ||2||
You are immaculate and pure, O Brilliant Lord of Wealth! ||2||

ਰਾਮਾ ਭਗਤਿ ਰਾਮਾਨੰਦੁ ਜਾਨੈ ॥
रामा भगति रामानंदु जानै ॥
raamaa bhagat raamaanand jaanai.
Raamaanand knows the devotional worship of the Lord.

ਪੂਰਨ ਪਰਮਾਨੰਦੁ ਬਖਾਨੈ ॥੩॥
पूरन परमानंदु बखानै ॥३॥
pooran parmaanand bakhaanai. ||3||
He says that the Lord is all-pervading, the embodiment of supreme joy. ||3||

ਮਦਨ ਮੂਰਤਿ ਭੈ ਤਾਰਿ ਗੋਬਿੰਦੇ ॥
मदन मूरति भै तारि गोबिंदे ॥
madan moorat bhai taar gobinday.
The Lord of the world, of wondrous form, has carried me across the terrifying world ocean.

ਸੈਨੁ ਭਣੈ ਭਜੁ ਪਰਮਾਨੰਦੇ ॥੪॥੨॥
सैनु भणै भजु परमानंदे ॥४॥२॥
sain bhanai bhaj parmaananday. ||4||2||
Says Sain, remember the Lord, the embodiment of supreme joy! ||4||2

== See also ==
- Nhavi
