= Gokul (disambiguation) =

Gokul is a municipality (or nagar panchayat) in the Mathura district of the Indian state of Uttar Pradesh.

Gokul may also refer to:

- Gokul (director), Indian film director
- Gokul (Meitei actor), Indian actor in Meitei cinema
- Gokul Suresh, Indian film actor
- Gokul Pandit, a fictional villain portrayed by Ashutosh Rana in the 1998 Indian film Dushman
- Gokul (restaurant), Mumbai
- Gokul Butail (Political strategist)
- Commiphora wightii or Indian bdellium-tree, a flowering plant

== See also ==
- Gokulathil Seethai (disambiguation)
- Gokula (died 1670), Jat chieftain of Tilpat in northern India
- Gokula (film), a 2009 Indian Kannada-language comedy drama film by Prakash
