= Swami Balanand =

Warlord of Bairagis & Vaishnav Saint Warrior

Swami Balanandacharya
- Title: • Shri Shaddarshan Shahanshah • Ani Akhara Sansthapak • Chatuh Sampradayacharya • Jagadguru • Khaksar Badshah

Religious life
- Religion: Hinduism
- Philosophy: Vishishtadvaita
- Sect: Ramanandi Sampradaya

Religious career
- Teacher: Swami Vrajanandacharya

Swami Balanandacharya was a Vaishnav saint of Ramanandi Sampradaya in the 18th century. He was the chief mahant of the Galta (near Jaipur) Hanuman temple, and armed the four Vaishnava sects to counter the increasing attacks by Shaiva monks.
