= Swedish interactive thresholding algorithm =

- Purpose: test visual field loss

The Swedish interactive thresholding algorithm, usually referred to as SITA, is a method to test for visual field loss, usually in glaucoma testing or monitoring. It is combined with a visual field test such as standard automated perimetry (SAP) or short wavelength automated perimetry (SWAP) to determine visual fields in a more efficient manner.

Standard automated perimetry determines how dim of light (the threshold) can be seen at various points in an individual eye's visual field. Various algorithms have been developed to determine this threshold in the dozens to over a hundred individual points in a single visual field. The SITA algorithm optimizes the determination of perimetry thresholds by continuously estimating what the expected threshold is based on the patient's age and neighboring thresholds. In this manner, it can reduce the time necessary to acquire a visual field by up to 50%, and it decreases patient fatigue and increases reliability. SITA mode is now widely used in many computerized automated perimeters.

The testing mode interrupts testing when measurement error is reached. This results in a shorter test time with reportedly equal accuracy as other automated threshold visual fields.
