= Holy Family Academy (Philippines) =

Roman Catholic school in Angeles, Philippines

Location
- Fil-Am Friendship Highway, Angeles City, Pampanga; Philippines; 15°07′41″N 120°34′35″E

Information
- Former name: Colegio de la Sagrada Familia (1910-1922)
- Type: Private, Catholic Parochial Non-profit Coeducational Basic education institution
- Motto: Latin: Ora et Labora; English: Prayer and Work
- Religious affiliations: Roman Catholic (Missionary Benedictine Sisters)
- Established: 20 August 1906; 120 years ago
- Founder: Fr. Pablo Gamboa
- School code: 401318
- President: Sr. Mary Christine L. Pinto, OSB
- Principal: Mrs. Aurora M. Yutuc, (High School); Mrs. La Fawn T. Evangelista (Grade School)
- Enrollment: 3,600+
- Campus: Urban: Main campus (Old Site) Sto. Rosario St. Angeles City (Preschool & Grades 1-6); Satellite campus (New Site) 5 hectares (50,000 m^{2}) Fil-Am Friendship Highway, Cutcut, Angeles City (Grades 7-12)
- Colors: Navy Blue and White
- Nickname: Familians
- Accreditation: PAASCU: Grade School Department Level III (valid until Nov. 2028); High School Department Level III (valid until Nov. 2028)
- Newspaper: Cor Unum
- Annual tuition: ₱31,847–₱46,960 (2021)
- Affiliations: PAASCU AAPSP ABS, CEAP
- Website: www.hfa.edu.ph

Holy Family Academy, also referred to by its acronym HFA, is a private Catholic basic education school administered by the Congregation of the Missionary Benedictine Sisters of Tutzing in Angeles, Pampanga, Philippines. It was established in 1906 as a Catholic parochial school and named Colegio de la Sagrada Familia in 1910. It is now one of the most prestigious schools in Angeles City. It has both elementary and high school departments as well as kindergarten and preparatory school (known in the school as "prep") classes for younger students. The school follows the Benedictine tradition of Ora et Labora, which means "Prayer and Work".

HFA is a Catholic Institution belonging to the Archdiocese of San Fernando, Pampanga and administered by the Missionary Benedictine Sisters. It is registered with SEC as a non-stock, non-profit corporation, with its assets and income used directly and exclusively for educational purposes including expansion when needed to carry out the aims and objectives of the school.

== History ==
Holy Family Academy (HFA) was established on August 20, 1906 as the first Catholic parochial school of Angeles City through the initiative of Fr. Pablo Gamboa and with the assistance of the Board of Directors of the Parochial School in Angeles City composed of Mariano V. Henson, Juan G. Nepomuceno, Sr., Laureano Suarez, Filomeno Leon Y. Santos, Basilio Henson and Jose P. Henson. Located at the present site of the Holy Rosary Parish rectory, the school offered a primary course and was run by lay teachers who were paid out of contributions.

=== The Augustinian Sisters ===
In 1910, the Augustinian Sisters of Our Lady of Consolation took over and set up the Colegio de la Sagrada Familia with the help of the same Board of Directors. The colegio offered a complete elementary education and accepted female boarders.

Some time later, as the student population of the colegio increased, Jose P. Henson and Juan Nepomuceno Sr. initiated the school's expansion. They bought land and built a house that became the parish hall and the residence of succeeding parish priests. The Colegio de la Sagrada Familia moved to the present site of the Administrative Building of HFA.

=== The Missionary Benedictine Sisters ===
In June 1922, the Missionary Benedictine Sisters took over the management of the school upon the invitation of the parish priest Msgr. Pedro P. Santos and changed the school's name to "Holy Family Academy". The Benedictine Sisters did not take in boarders but actively attended to the supervision and administration of the school.

The first group of Missionary Benedictine Sisters headed by Sister Crescentia Veser were Germans and arrived in Angeles City in 1925, with the appointment of Sister Pacifica Gerding as the first resident superior. The Benedictine Sisters at Holy Family Academy became a juridical community.

Holy Family Academy continued to operate during the Japanese occupation period, closing only for a few months during the change of political administration and reopened its doors soon after the end of World War II.

As of the school year 2012–2013, the school is under the leadership of Sister Josefina Nepomuceno OSB and have just recently celebrated its centennial.

=== The Opening of the High School Department ===
In 1960, HFA opened the High School Department exclusively for girls.

The growth in population of Angeles City brought about an increase in the enrolment of HFA resulting in crowding and congestion in the old campus beside the Holy Rosary Parish Church on Sto. Rosario St. In search of a solution to growth problems, Sister Mary Bernard Lansang, OSB, superior/directress in 1983, together with concerned Renato Tayag, Jr. initiated the formulation of a foundation. This was realized during the term of Sister Ildephonsa Pineda, OSB as superior/directress and Mr. Florante Timbol as PTA president in the incorporation of the HFA-PTA Foundation with the occurrence of Oscar V. Cruz, then Archbishop of San Fernando.

=== High School Campus in Cutcut (New Site) ===
With the involvement of parents, alumni and other supporters through membership contributions and fundraising activities, the HFA-PTA obtained a five-hectare lot in Cutcut along the Circumferential Road. The four-phase building program was started. In 1987, phase one was completed, enabling the transfer of the 1st Year students to the new campus. Boys were then accepted in the high school. By 1988, phase two was completed, and two more year levels moved over. In 1991, with the completion of phase three, the entire High School settled in the new site, the Cutcut campus. With the support of the HFA Alumni Association, the covered court was partially constructed. This was completed in 1997. The new Pedro Calungsod Building that housed the audio visual center, the library and the canteen was completed in December 2002.

In the Cutcut campus, the High School Department occupies the Sto. Niño Building, the San Lorenzo Building, the San Pedro Calungsod Building and the covered court.

In the old site at Sto. Rosario St., the Preschool and Grade School occupy the following multi-story buildings: St. Benedict with the Auditorium, St. Joseph's, St. Mary's, the H.E. Building and the Main Building.

As of 2014, the Department of Education (DepEd) approved the K-12 Curriculum to be implemented in Holy Family Academy. Construction began in 2014 for the Senior High Building. In 2016, the Senior High building was finished. It is the newest building in the campus, located in the New Site. Its purpose is to provide more learning facilities for Senior High school students (Grades 11 and 12).

=== COVID-19 ===
In July 2020, Holy Family Academy announced that the school is ready to conduct online classes to provide its students' learning needs amid the COVID-19 Pandemic.

== Academic affiliation ==
HFA is a member of the Association of Archdiocesan and Parochial Schools of Pampanga (AAPSP), the Association of Benedictine Schools (ABS), the Catholic Educational Association of the Philippines (CEAP), and the Philippine Accrediting Association of Schools, Colleges and Universities (PAASCU).

== School activities ==
The school observes most major Catholic holidays particularly those associated with the founder of the Benedictine Order, Saint Benedict. First Friday Holy Masses are also celebrated, and the students are required to attend. Students in the old site celebrate Holy Mass at the nearby Holy Rosary Parish Church, Angeles City's oldest while those who are in the new site, particularly High School students celebrate theirs in the Covered Court of the school.

There are also quite a number of extracurricular activities that are observed by the school, some of which aren't observed regularly, a few of these are:

- Organization of Clubs – students join a particular club that holds activities for a certain point of interest, for example, Math Club, Science Club, Young Writers' Club, and the like. Clubs vary for grade school and high school departments. Preschoolers are not allowed to join clubs
- Ecology Month – observed as a month of appreciation for Mother Earth, similar to the Earth Day celebrations
- Ecology Week – A week in the Ecology Month used for the culminating activities such as the Science Quiz Show and the Tree Planting at Cutcut Farm
- Academic Weeks – week-long activities devoted to a particular academic subject taught in the school, e.g. Math Week, Physics Week, History Week and the like
- Recollections and Retreats – an integral part of the spiritual life of students in the school
- Rosary Month – celebrated throughout the month of October. Students then are tasked to prepare an altar (usually at the back of their classrooms) and would take time to pray the rosary together.
- SCIP Activities: Year Level Apostolate: Year I – Cutcut Elementary School, Year II – Bahay Pag-ibig, Year III – HAVEN, Year IV – Aeta Community, Faculty: KKP, Mabalacat
- Songfest – usually held during the holiday season, classes contest to exhibit the best interpretation of a popular Christmas song with the exception of S.Y. 2011–2012, when it was done during the week when Intramurals and Book Week were incorporated with it.
- Peace Concert – pioneering in 2003, the Peace Concert is a gathering of the academy's performing artists to celebrate and propagate peace and goodwill through music, dance and cultural presentations
- Intramurals – sports is celebrated in this usually 3 to 4-day activity, this is a chance for students to unwind from the usual peculiarities of school life
- Buwan ng Wika – a month-long celebration of the national language of the Philippines

== Notable alumni ==
- Edu Pamintuan – current councilor of Angeles City

== Cor Unum ==
The Cor Unum is the official student publication of Holy Family Academy. Both the grade school and high school department publish a version of the newsletter. Popular by its tagline "One Heart", the Cor Unum exists as a venue for students to practice freedom of speech and as an area to voice out their concerns. It follows the common format of a student newsletter, with Opinions, editorials, news features, entertainment clippings, literary works, trivia and the like.

The newsletter selects its editorial board from the pool of students of Holy Family Academy. All students are invited to take part in the publication. There is a series of tests to filter which students are perfect to land the job as editors, reporters, photographers, cartoonists and contributors, among others. The administration select two moderators for the school paper, usually the members of the English and Filipino faculty, to facilitate the editorial staff in managing the newsletter.

== Campus ==
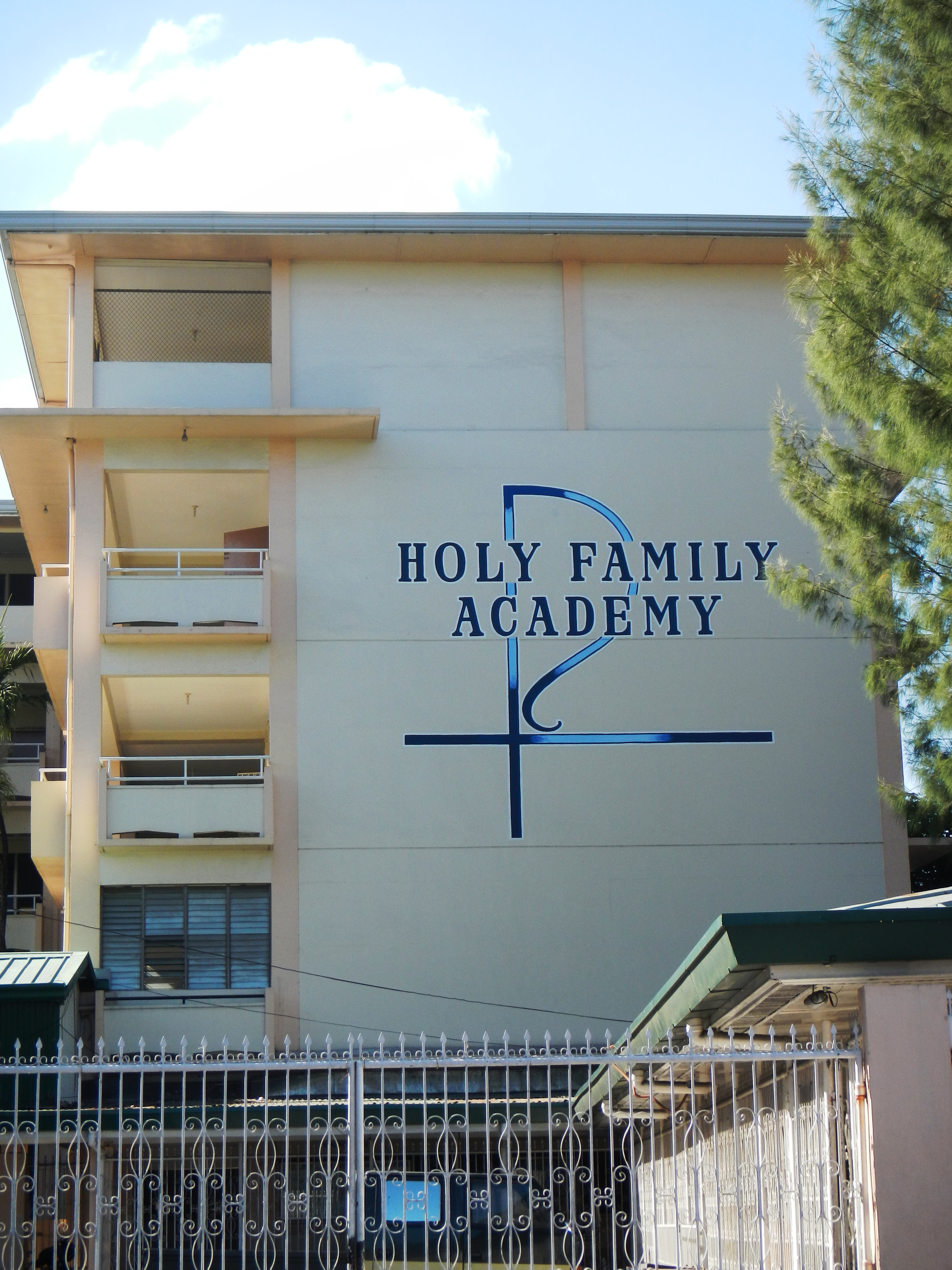
School facade

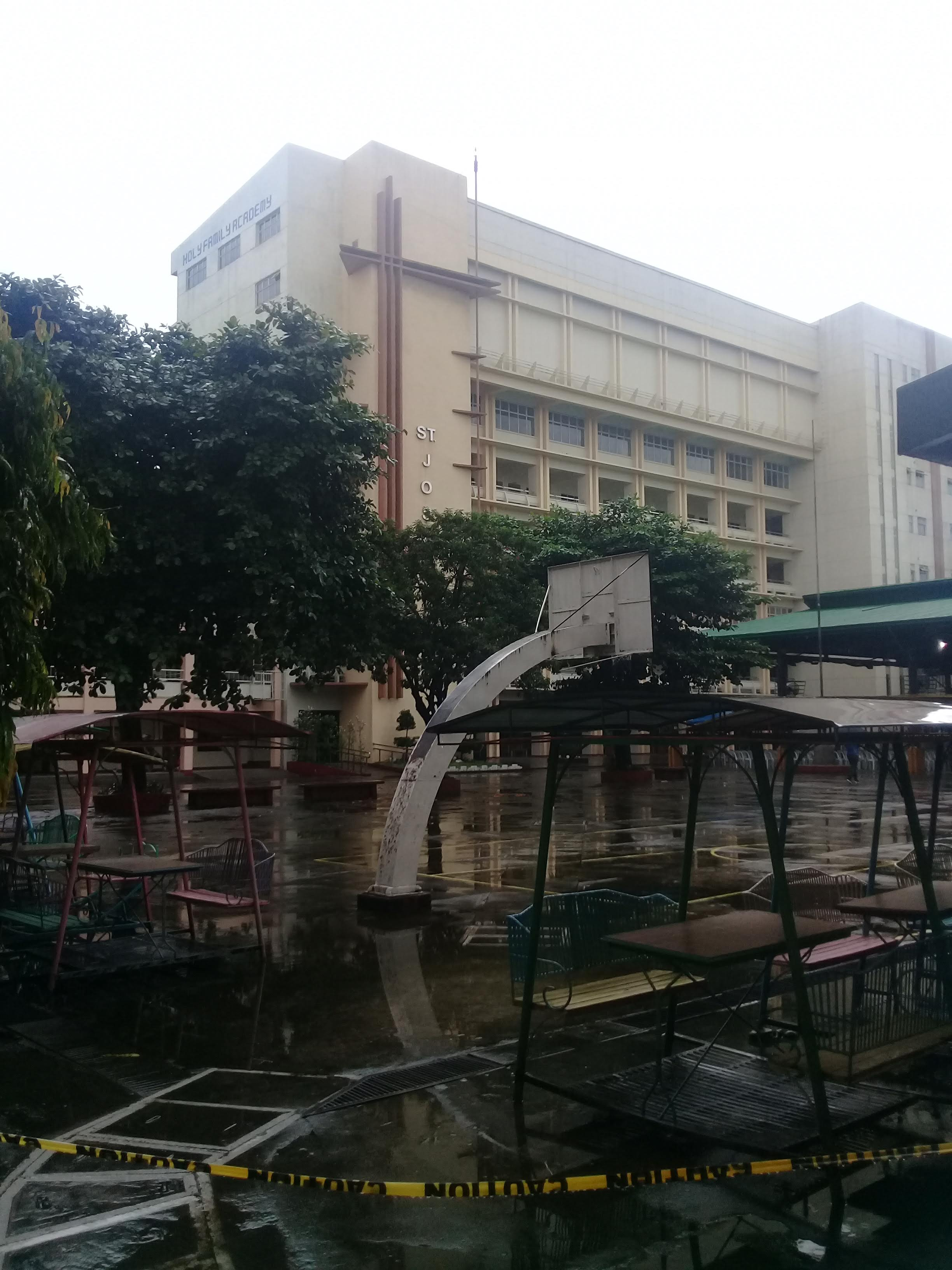
St. Joseph Bldg., HFA Old Site, August 2019

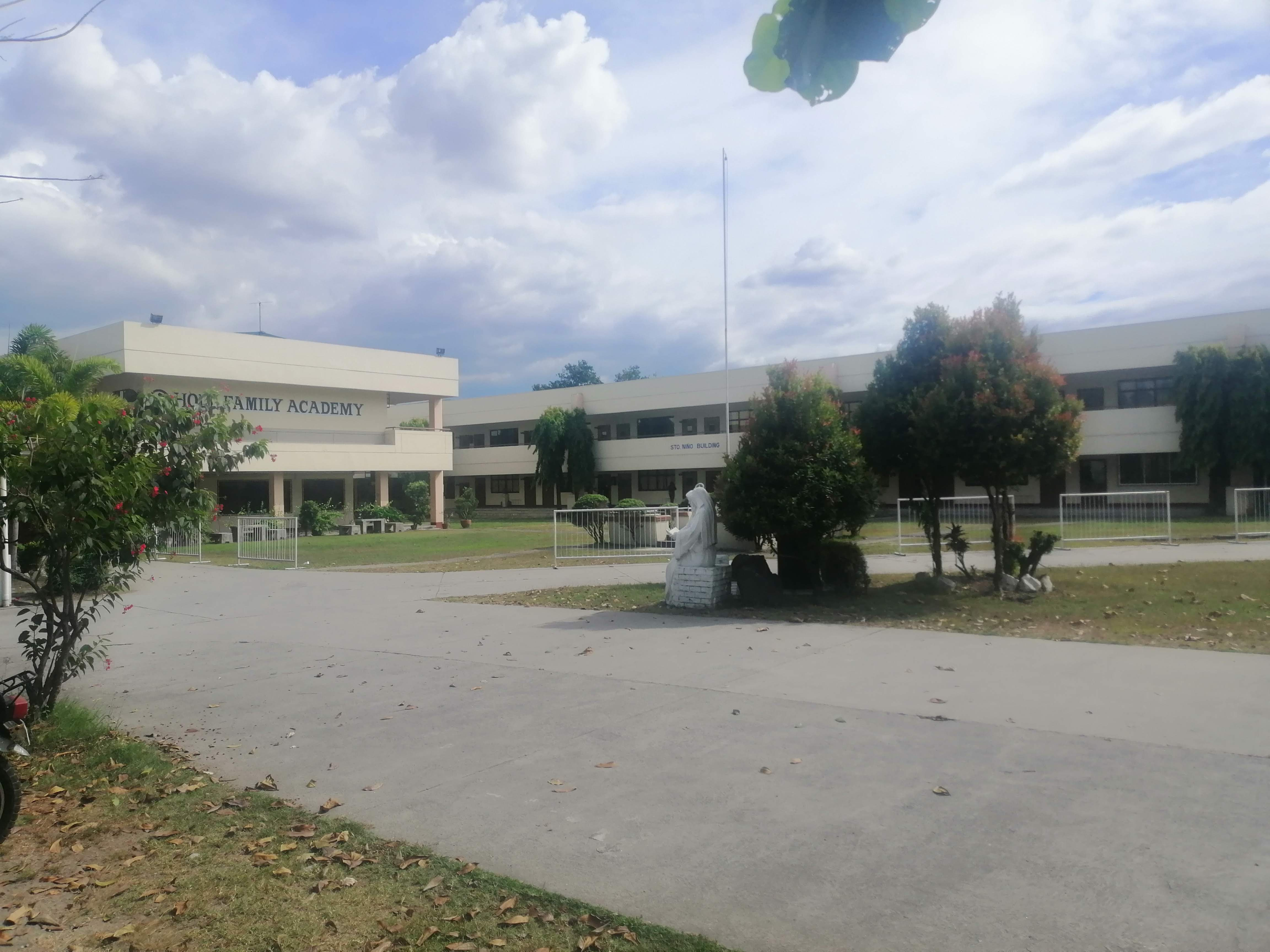
Sto. Niño Building, Holy Family Academy New Site, March 2021

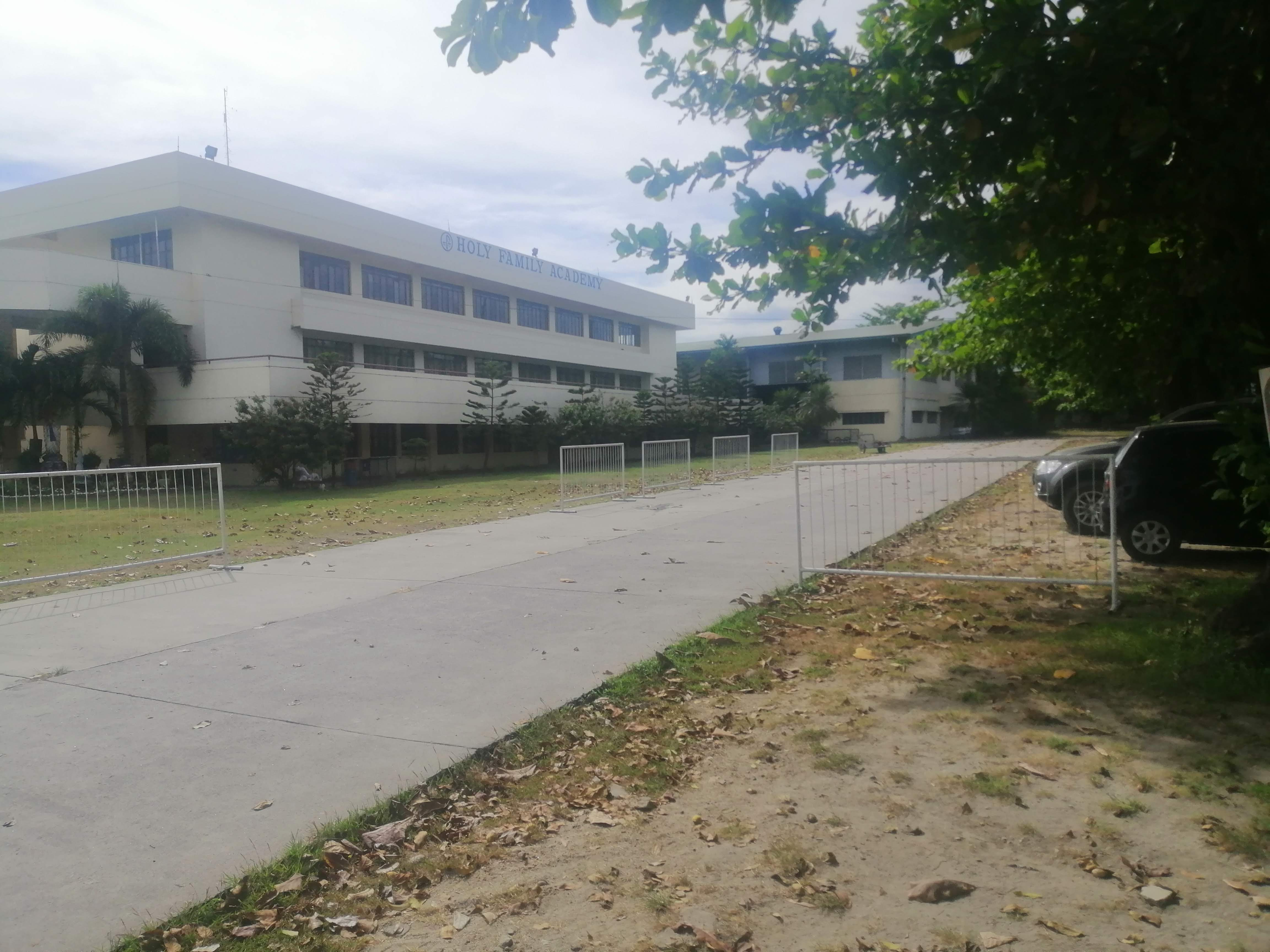
Pedro Calungsod Building in New Site, March 2021

=== Main Campus (Old Site) ===
The Main Campus, popularly referred as the Old Site, is a 1-hectare land in Sto. Rosario St., Angeles City, beside the Holy Rosary Parish Church that features 5 major buildings and structures that include:

- St. Mary Building, a 4-storey building that houses classrooms for nursery, kindergarten, grade levels 1, 2, 5, and 6, and also some faculty offices.
- St. Joseph Building, originally was a 2-storey building that once housed the library on the second floor and the canteen in the first floor. Renovated and finished construction in 2012, now it features 2 elevators, 6 additional floors, and additional facilities such as coordinator offices, conference room, and a prayer room on the 2nd Floor; a library in the 3rd floor; a music room, speech laboratories, Audio-Visual Rooms on the 4th floor; computer laboratories on the 5th floor; an entire floor of a P.E. room on the 6th floor; a theater on the 7th floor; and water tanks, utility rooms, and storage areas on the 8th floor which is off-limits.
- St. Benedict Building, a 5-storey building adjacent to the main entrance that houses the auditorium, main canteen, classrooms for grades 4 and 3, a science laboratory, faculty offices, business office, treasury office, and the registrar. It also features a bridge behind it that connects the 3rd floor of the St. Benedict building and the 2nd floor of the St. Joseph building.
- Covered Court
- Administrative Offices

=== Annex Campus (New Site) ===
The New Site is a 5-hectare land located in Cutcut, Angeles City along the Fil-Am Friendship Highway, also known as the Friendship Circumferential Road. Only 2.72 hectares of the land is utilized for education, the rest of the area is an off-limits farm wherein tree planting projects are done. The buildings within the utilized area are:

- Sto. Niño Building, a 2-storey building that houses classrooms for grades 9 and 10, administrative offices, guidance counselor office, faculty offices, prayer room, science laboratories, computer laboratories, and a robotics laboratory.
- San Lorenzo Ruiz Building, a 2-storey building that houses classrooms for grades 7 and 8, an office for the student government organization, an office for the head in student involvement for charity, a dressmaking room, a technical drafting room, and a home economics kitchen.
- San Pedro Calungsod Building, a 3-storey building that consists of the canteen on the ground floor, a library on the 2nd floor, and Audio-Visual Rooms on the 3rd floor.
- St. Benedict & St. Scholastica Building (SHS Building), the newest building in the campus that houses classrooms for grades 11-12. It has a study hall, Clausura, and a theater on the ground floor.
- Covered Court
