= Sita, Mauritania =

Former Roman Catholic diocese

Sita is an ancient city and former diocese in the Roman province of Mauretania Caesariensis. It remains a Latin Catholic titular see.

== History ==
Sita, located somewhere in modern Algeria, was one of many cities important enough in the western part of the Roman province of Mauretania Caesariensis, in the papal sway, to become a suffragan diocese, but like most faded, plausibly at the 7th century advent of Islam.

Its only historically recorded bishops were:

- The Donatist schismatic Saturnus partook in the Council of Carthage in 411, on that very heresy, without Catholic counterpart.
- Catholic bishop Reparatus attended the synod called in Carthage in 484 on the same schism by king Huneric of the Vandal Kingdom, after which he was exiled like most Catholic bishops.

== Titular see ==
The diocese was nominally restored in 1933 as Latin Titular bishopric of Sita (Latin = Curiate Italian), Latin adjective Siten(sis).

It has had the following incumbents, so far of the fitting Episcopal (lowest) rank:

- Christian Herman Winkelmann (1933.09.13 – 1939.12.27) as Auxiliary Bishop of Archdiocese of Saint Louis (USA) (1933.09.13 – 1939.12.27), later Bishop of Wichita (USA) (1939.12.27 – death 1946.11.19)
- Joseph O’Brien (1940.03.19 – 1945.04.07) as Auxiliary Bishop of Diocese of Hartford (USA) (1940.03.19 – 1945.04.07), succeeding as last suffragan Bishop of Hartford (USA) (1945.04.07 – 1953.08.06), (see) promoted first Metropolitan Archbishop of Hartford (1953.08.06 – retired 1968.11.20), emeritate as Titular Archbishop of Uthina (1968.11.20 – 1971.01.05); died 1976
- Daniel Joseph Feeney (1946.06.22 – 1955.09.09) as Auxiliary Bishop of Portland in Maine (USA) (1946.06.22 – 1952.03.04); later Coadjutor Bishop of Portland in Maine (1952.03.04 – 1955.09.09), succeeding as Bishop of Portland in Maine (1955.09.09 – death 1969.09.15)
- Alexander Carter (1956.12.10 – 1958.11.22) as Coadjutor Bishop of Sault Sainte Marie (Canada) (1956.12.10 – 1958.11.22); next succeeded as Bishop of Sault Sainte Marie (1958.11.22 – retired 1985.05.03), also President of Canadian Conference of Catholic Bishops (1967 – 1970); died 2002
- Angelo Zambarbieri (1959.03.12 – 1960.05.06) as Coadjutor Bishop of Guastalla (Italy) (1959.03.12 – 1960.05.06), next succeeding as Bishop of Guastalla (1960.05.06 – death 1970.08.15)
- James Ward (1960.07.02 – 1973.10.21) as Auxiliary Bishop of Archdiocese of Glasgow (Scotland, UK) (1960.07.02 – death 1973.10.21)
- Enrique Alvear Urrutia (1974.02.09 – 1982.04.29) as Auxiliary Bishop of Archdiocese of Santiago (Chile) (1974.02.09 – death 1982.04.29); previously Titular Bishop of Columnata (1963.03.04 – 1965.06.07) as Auxiliary Bishop of Talca (Chile) (1963.03.04 – 1965.06.07), Bishop of San Felipe (Chile) (1965.06.07 – resigned 1974.02.09)
- José Palmeira Lessa (1982.06.21 – 1987.10.30) as Auxiliary Bishop of Archdiocese of (São Sebastião do) Rio de Janeiro (Brazil) (1982.06.21 – 1987.10.30); next Bishop of Propriá (Brazil) (1987.10.30 – 1996.12.06), Coadjutor Archbishop of Aracaju (Brazil) (1996.12.06 – 1998.08.26) succeeding as Metropolitan Archbishop of Aracaju (1998.08.26 – 2017.01.18)
- Moacyr José Vitti, Stigmatines (C.S.S.) (1987.11.12 – 2002.05.15) as Auxiliary Bishop of Archdiocese of Curitiba (Brazil) (1987.11.12 – 2002.05.15), next Bishop of Piracicaba (Brazil) (2002.05.15 – 2004.05.19), Metropolitan Archbishop of above Curitiba (2004.05.19 – death 2014.06.26)
- Štefan Sečka (2002.06.28 – 2011.08.04) as Auxiliary Bishop of Diocese of Spiš (Slovakia) (2002.06.28 – 2011.08.04), succeeding as Bishop of Spiš (2011.08.04 – ...)
- Joaquim Wladimir Lopes Dias (2011.12.21 – 2015.03.04) as Auxiliary Bishop of Archdiocese of Vitória (Brazil) (2011.12.21 – 2015.03.04), also Apostolic Administrator of Diocese of Colatina (Brazil) (2014.05.14 – 2015.03.04), succeeding as Bishop of Colatina (2015.03.04 – ...)
- Udo Markus Bentz (2015.07.15 – ...) as Auxiliary Bishop of Diocese of Mainz (western Germany), nor previous prelature

== See also ==
- List of Catholic dioceses in Algeria

== Sources and external links ==
- GCatholic

Bibliography

- Pius Bonifacius Gams, Series episcoporum Ecclesiae Catholicae, Leipzig 1931, p. 468
- Stefano Antonio Morcelli, Africa christiana, Volume I, Brescia 1816, p. 283
