= Vaishnava Matabja Bhaskara =

Hindu text

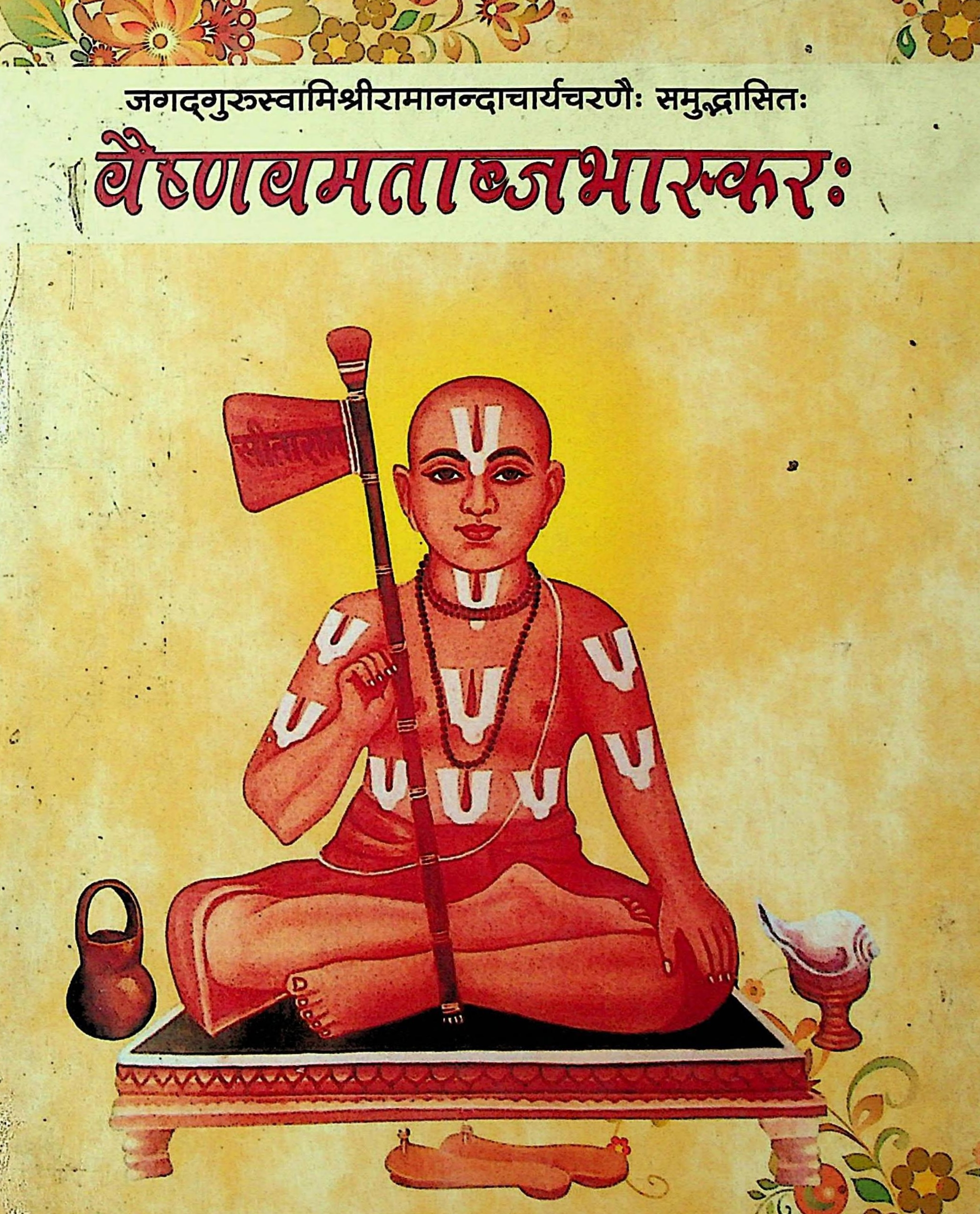
- Ramananda with his Tridanda

Information
- Religion: Hinduism
- Author: Ramananda
- Language: Sanskrit
- Chapters: 10
- Verses: 204

The Vaishnava Matabja Bhaskara (IAST: Vaiṣṇava Mātābja Bhāskara, Sanskrit: वैष्णवमताब्जभास्कर:) is one of the most prominent works of Ramananda in Sanskrit. This work is a dialogue between Ramananda and his disciple named Surasurananda.

In the Vaishnava Matabja Bhaskara, Ramananda has answered the 10 most prominent questions related to Vaishnavism. Its primary focus is worship of Rama along with Sita and Lakshmana. The text mentions that one's devotion should be like flowing oil which means consistent or unbreakable. According to this text, the ultimate goal of a person is the attainment of Rama as he is one who resides in everyone's heart and is the protector of whole universe and who is known through Upanishads. By practicing under the guidance of a guru, a person reaches the divine abode, Saketa, where one attains the proximity of Sri Rama. From there, one does not return to this earthly realm. The philosophy of Ramcharit Manas is also in accordance to Vaishnava Matabja Bhaskara. The text also states that every individual irrespective of his colour, gender, caste, background, etc. is worthy of Sharanagati unto the holy Lotus feet of Rama. Ramananda in his Vaishnava Matabja Bhaskara says:

Vaishnava Matabja Bhaskara

सर्वे प्रपत्तेरधिकारिणः सदा शक्ता अशक्ता पदयोर्जगत्प्रभोः । अपेक्ष्यते तत्र कुलं बलञ्च नो न चापि कालो न च शुद्धतापि वै ॥ Everyone has the right to seek refuge in Lord Shri Ram, regardless of their capabilities, as the supremely compassionate Lord does not expect the strength of high lineage, knowledge, appropriate timing, or any kind of purification for accepting one at His divine feet. Hence, every individual is entitled to attain the grace of the Divine.—Vaishnava Matabja Bhaskara Chapter 4

== Chapters overview ==
- First chapter is known as Tattva-Nirūpaṇam, deals with the Tattva Trayam, i.e. Prakriti, Jiva and Parmatman.
- Second chapter is known as Japyanirdhāraṇanirūpaṇam, deals with three main mantras in the lineage of Sri Rama Mantraraja, i.e. Rama Shadakshara Mantra (rāṃa rāmāya namaḥ), Dvaya Mantra (śrīmadrāmacandracharaṇau śaraṇaṃ prapadye, śrīmate rāmacandrāya namaḥ) and Charam Mantra (sakṛdeva prapannāya tavāsmīti ca yācate abhayaṃ sarvabhūtebhyo dadāmyetad vratam mama).
- Third Chapter is known as Dhyānadhīyanirūpaṇam, it states that a Vaishnava should meditate on the two-armed Rama and further explains the procedure of meditating upon the deity.
- Fourth Chapter is muktisādhananirūpaṇam, it deals with panch sanskar of a Vaishnava:

तप्तेन मूले भुजयोः समङ्कनं शरेण चापेन तथोर्ध्वपुण्ड्रकम् ।
श्रुतिश्रुतं नाम च मन्त्रमालिके संस्कारभेदाः परमार्थहेतवः ॥

This translates to: The Vedic rituals of imprinting the bow and arrow on the arm, wearing the vertical tilak mark, Urdhvapundra, adopting names associated with devotion unto Rama (such as dasānta, prapannanta, or sharananta), always wearing a tulasi bead around the neck, and receiving the instruction of the six-syllabled Ramataraka Mantra from a Vaishnava acharya, are considered essential for spiritual liberation in Vaishnavism.

- Fifth Chapter is known as Sarvottamadharmanirūpaṇam, in this Ramananda states that the most auspicious thing in this world is non violence, nothing can be Greater than peace. A religious person should completely avoid violence for the growth of his religion. As fire is situated in the wood but can't be seen same like that God is also situated in every living organism but can't be seen, if one does violence towards anybody it is considered as a violence towards God.
- Sixth Chapter is Vaiṣṇavabhēdanirūpaṇam, in this Ramananda has described about the two types of Jivas, i.e. Baddha Jiva and Mukta Jiva and further he has explained its subtypes.
- Seventh Chapter is called as Vaiṣṇavalakṣaṇanirūpaṇam, in this chapter Ramananda has given the few definitions of being a Vaishnava, like He says:
  धृतोर्ध्वपुण्ड्रस्तुलसीसमुद्भवां दधच्च कण्ठे शुभमालिकां जनः । तज्जन्मकर्माणि हरेरुदाहरेद् गृह्णंश्च नामानि शुभप्रदानि सः ॥

This Translates to: A person who wears the upward-pointing tilaka (urdhva pundra) on twelve places of their body and adorn themselves with the sacred Tulsi bead around their neck, while singing and chanting the divine names and pastimes of Rama's incarnations, is considered a Vaishnava.

- Eighth Chapter is called as Vaiṣṇavakālakṣepanirūpaṇam, in this Ramananda describes about the daily routine of a Vaishnava who are dedicated towards getting Moksha, what they should read on daily basis:
  प्रातर्मध्याह्नसायं कृतशुचिकृतिभिः राममभ्यर्च्य सम्यक् श्रीमद्रामायणेन प्रतिदिनमखिलैर्भारतेन प्रपन्नैः । शक्तैरानन्दभाष्यैरथ च शुभतमाचार्यदिव्यप्रबन्धैः कालक्षेपो विधेयः सुविजितकरणैः स्वाकृतेर्यावदन्तम् ॥

This Translates to: A self-disciplined Vaishnava, having control over their senses, should, every morning, noon, and evening, conclude their cleansing rituals and worship Sita-Rama. Following this, they should engage in the study of sacred scriptures like the Ramayana, Mahabharata, Bhagavata, and Vaishnava texts like Anandabhashya to enrich their spiritual knowledge.

Further in this chapter Ramananda says, "If unable to perform the aforementioned practices, one should listen to these sacred texts after the daily cleansing rituals. If that's also not possible, then engaging in chanting the name of Sri Sita-Rama is recommended. If that too isn't feasible, then one should continually seek and meditate upon the divine Dvaya-mantra of Sri Rama." This shows that Ramananda has not let any stone unturned to easy the path of bhakti.

- Ninth Chapter is Prāpyanirūpaṇam, in this chapter Ramananda talks about what is most supremely attainable thing in whole universe. He says that, "The one who is eternally united with Sita, who is oceans of divine auspicious qualities, who is known through the Upanishads, and is the cause of the universe, who is eternal and beyond creation and destruction, loved by the Creator Brahma and other deities, shining brighter than stars, sun, moon, fire, and lightning, unconquerable even by the weapons of mighty enemies - such Bhagavan Sri Rama is the ultimate attainment."
- Tenth Chapter is Vaiṣṇavanivāsyasthānanirūpaṇam, it talks about the places where Vaishnavas should live. He says, "Wherever, in whichever divine playgrounds of Lord Sri Rama, in whichever forms He has incarnated, Vaishnavas should reside, worshipping and honoring those forms. (It means, the all revered - and all- worshippable Sri Rama, the bestower of all four goals of life, is being worshipped everywhere in those various forms - Vaishnavas should reside in those sacred places with this sentiment, worshipping and honoring those forms.)"

== See also ==
- Valmiki Samhita
- Maithili Maha Upanishad
- Sri Ramarchan Paddati
- Rama
- Sita
- Tulsidas
