= Valmiki Samhita =

Sanskrit text attributed to Valmiki

- Pancharatra

Information
- Religion: Hinduism
- Author: Valmiki
- Language: Sanskrit
- Chapters: 6
- Verses: 529

The Valmiki Samhita (Sanskrit: वाल्मीकिसंहिता, romanized: Vālmīkisaṁhitā) is a Sanskrit text of six chapters. It comes under the Narada Panchratra. The Valmiki Samhita is attributed to the worship of Rama and Sita. It describes them to be the ultimate reality.

According to the Valmiki Samhita, Rama is Svayam Bhagavan whose abode is higher than the highest and who is considered as the origin of Chaturvyuha, namely Vasudeva, Sankarshana, Pradyumna, and Aniruddha.

== Chapters overview ==
- First Chapter: This chapter, containing 69 shlokas, is known as Vedotpatti Nirupanam. In this chapter, Brahma reveals that the lord of the Vedas are Rama and Sita.
- Second Chapter: This chapter with 86 shlokas is known as Vishishtadvaita Siddhanta Nirupanam. In this chapter for the very first time the word Vishishtadvaita was used. Here in this chapter is a detailed explanation of Vishishtadvaita Philosophy.
- Third Chapter: This chapter, 109 shlokas long, is known as Rama Mantra Mahatmaya Varnanam. In this chapter a detailed glorification of Sri Ram Mantraraj (The Mantra King of Rama, i.e. Ram Shadakshar Mantra, rāṃ rāmāya namaḥ) is described as well as how the mantra of Rama came to this earth.
- Fourth Chapter: This 35-shloka chapter is known as Urdhvapundra Nirupanam. In this chapter the glory of the Urdhva Pundra is described and why it should be applied on forehead.
- Fifth Chapter: This chapter is known as Kalakshepa Vidhi Nirupanam. This 76-shloka chapter contains the complete Maithili Maha Upanishad (attached with Atharvaveda) in which the lineage of Sri Ram Mantraraj (The Mantra King of Rama, i.e. Ram Shadakshar Mantra, rāṃ rāmāya namaḥ) is described by Sita to seven sages including Lātyāna.
- Sixth Chapter: This is the last chapter of Valmiki Samhita and is known as Prakridvishaya Nirupanam. There are a total of 154 shlokas in the sixth chapter.

== Maithili Mahopanishad ==
Maithili Mahopanishad (Sanskrit: मैथिली महोपनिषद्) is found completely quoted in Valmiki Samhita's Chapter 5. Maithili Mahopanishad has total five chapters in a dialogue form between Sita and sages and this dialogue was described to Parvati by Shiva. This Upaniṣad describes the lineage of Sri Ram Mantraraj (i.e. Ram Shadakshar Mantra, rāṃ rāmāya namaḥ)

Maithili Mahopanishad

इममेव मनुं पूर्वं साकेतपतिर्मामिवोचत् । अहं हनुमते मम प्रियाय प्रियतराय । सर्वेद वेदिने ब्रह्मणे । स वसिष्ठाय । स पराशराय । स व्यासाय । स शुकाय । इत्येषोपनिषत् इत्येषा ब्रह्मविद्या ।

Goddess Sita says: This six-syllabled mantra, 'The Ram Mantra,' was given to me by the Lord of Saket, imparting divine instructions. I passed this Mantra to my dear and beloved servant, Hanuman. Hanuman passed it on to the knower of Vedas, Brahma. Brahma passed it on Vashishtha. Vashishtha instructed Parashara. Parashara passed it on to Vyasa. Vyasa imparted it to Shukadeva Muni. This is the essence of the Upanishads, this is the knowledge of the ultimate truth.—Maithili Mahopanishad Chapter 5

== Mentions ==
Valmiki Samhita comes under Panchratric text and Lakṣmī Narsimha Bhatt has placed it at 172 place in his work Panchratra Samhitasu and a western scholar F. Otto Schrader has kept Valmiki Samhita at 148 place in his work- Introduction to Panchratra and Ahirbudhnya Samhita. Acharya Baldev Upadhyay has also kept Valmiki Samhita under Panchratric text in his work Sanskrit Vangmay Ka Brihad Itihaas. Eminent scholars in India like Swami Karpatri and Anjani Nandan Sharan has kept Valmiki Samhita under a most important text in the worship of Rama and Sita in their works Ramayana Mimansa and Vinay Piyush respectively . Valmiki Samhita's mention is also found in other scriptures like Vishwamitra Samhita.

== See also ==
- Maithili Maha Upanishad
- Pancharatra
- Ramcharitmanas
- Sri Ramarchan Paddati
- Tulsidas
- Vaishnava Matabja Bhaskara
- Valmiki
