= Maithili Maha Upanishad =

Sanskrit Upanishad

Maithili Mahopanishad
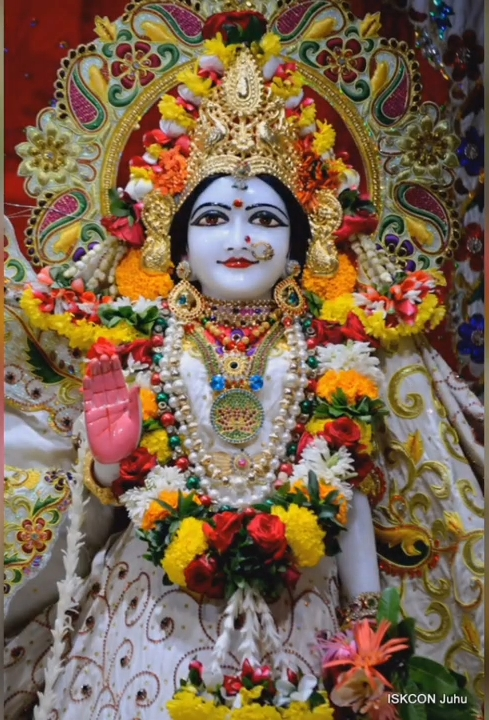
- Murti of Sita, ISKCON
- Devanagari: मैथिलीमहोपनिषद्
- IAST: Maithilī Mahopaniṣad
- Title means: The Great Upaniṣad of Maithili (Sita)
- Date: 10th to 11th Century CE
- Chapters: 5
- Philosophy: Vaishnavism

The Maithili Mahopanishad (Sanskrit: मैथिलीमहोपनिषद्, romanized: Maithilīmahopaniṣad) is a Sanskrit text and one of the minor Upanishads of Hinduism. It is featured in chapter five of the text Valmiki Samhita.

The Maithili Mahopanishad is among the important texts of the Ramanandi tradition.

== Chapters overview ==
The Maithili Mahopanishad has a total of five chapters. This Upanishad is a dialogue between Sita and the Saptarishi regarding the Supreme Reality.

The sages praise Sita as the sustainer of the world and the source for all spiritual knowledge. They identify her as the one who provided Bharmavidya to Hanuman, thus give her their salutations.

They then ask her what a person seeking salvation should chant, attain, meditate or know about.

This Upanishad also tells about the lineage of the Rama Mantraraja (The Rama Shadakshara Mantra: rāṃa rāmāya namaḥ), revealing how that lineage passed from one to another:

Sita said: This six-syllabled mantra, 'The Rama Mantra,' was given to me by the Lord of Saketa, imparting divine instructions. I passed this mantra to my dear and beloved servant, Hanuman. Hanuman passed it on to the knower of Vedas, Brahma. Brahma passed it on Vashishtha. Vashishtha instructed Parashara. Parashara passed it on to Veda Vyasa. Veda Vyasa imparted it to Shuka. This is the essence of the Upanishads, and this is the knowledge of the ultimate truth.

== See also ==
- Valmiki Samhita
- Vaishnava Matabja Bhaskara
- Upanishads
- Sita
- Rama
- Hanuman
