= Chalis =

Chalis or chalisa may refer to:

- The number forty in some South Asian languages including Hindi-Urdu
  - The Chalisa famine that hit South Asia in 1783, which is 1840 in the Vikram Samvat calendar
  - A Hindu hymn (stotra) of forty verses
    - Shiva Chalisa
    - Hanuman Chalisa
    - Ganesha Chalisa
- Stefanos Chalis (1796–1821), a chieftain in the Greek War of Independence

== See also ==
- Challis (disambiguation)
- Chalise, a surname
- Chalice, a cup used in ceremonies such as the Eucharist
- Chali, a Germanic tribe mentioned by Ptolemy
