= Rudrashtakam =

Sanskrit composition by Tulsidas

Rudrashtakam (Sanskrit: रुद्राष्टकम्, IAST: Rudrāṣṭakam) is a Sanskrit meditation stotra invoking Rudra, an epithet of Shiva. It was composed by the Hindu Bhakti poet Tulsidas (Sanskrit: तुलसीदास). Tulsidas composed this stotra in the late fifteenth century in what is now Uttar Pradesh and created many other literary pieces including the magnum opus Ramcharitmanas.

Rudrashtakam appears in the Uttara Kand of the Ramcharitmanas, where the sage Lomasha composed the hymn to invoke the energy of Shiva. This is composed in Bhujangaprayāt chhanda and Jagati meter which consists of 12 letters in each of the four stages.

== Poetry ==
The term "Astakam" is derived from the Sanskrit word aṣṭan, meaning "eight". An astakam is made up of eight stanzas.

In Rudrashtakam, each stanza is written in Jagati meter, and hence contains 48 syllables per stanza. Each line is written in the Bhujangaprayāt chhand, containing four groups of light-heavy-heavy syllables.

An Astakam belong to the genre of lyric poetry, which tends to be short, extremely melodic, and contemplative. It reflects and portrays the poet's own feelings, states of mind, and perceptions about the theme or character in the Astakam.

== Context ==
The Rudrashtakam narrates the qualities and deeds of Rudra.

The body of the Rudrashtakam includes many qualities, attributes and motifs associated with Shiva, including the destruction of Tripura, the annihilation of Kamadeva, etc. These symbols and motifs related to the life and deeds of Rudra.

== See also ==
- Shiv Chalisa, verse dedicated to Shiva
