= Challis (surname) =

Challis is a surname. Notable people with the surname include:

- Alva Challis (1930–2010), Welsh-born New Zealand geologist
- Christopher Challis (1919–2012), British cinematographer
- Ellie Challis (born 2004), British Paralympic swimmer
- George Challis (rugby league) (1889–1965), Australian rugby player
- Gordon Challis (1932–2018), New Zealand poet
- James Challis (1803–1882), British clergyman and astronomer
- John Challis (1942–2021), English actor
- John Henry Challis, Anglo-Australian merchant and philanthropist
- Louis Challis (1936–2017), Australian acoustical engineer
- Vivien Challis, Australian mathematician

== See also ==
- Chalis, surname
