= Challis =

Challis may refer to:

== People ==
- Challis (surname)

== Places ==
- Challis, Idaho
- Challis, New Zealand

== Other uses ==
- Challis (crater), a crater on Earth's moon
- Challis railway station
- "Challis", a song by American heavy metal band Dio off their 2000 studio album Magica
- Challis (fabric), a printed woven fabric.

== See also ==
- Chalice, a cup used in ceremonies such as the Eucharist
- Chalise, a surname
