= Chaupai (poetry) =

Indian poetic metre

A chaupai (Hindi 'चौपाई') is a quatrain verse of Indian poetry, especially medieval Hindi poetry. It uses a metre of four syllables.

Famous chaupais include those of poet-saint Tulsidas (used in his classical text Ramcharitamanas and poem Hanuman Chalisa).

Chaupai is identified by a syllable count 16/16, counted with a value of 1 in case of Hrasva (short sounding letter) and 2 in case of Dirgha (long sounding letter).

One of the Chalisas, is Hanuman Chalisa. It is a popular chaupai in Hindi prayers and is chanted in 40 chaupais with introductory and closing dohas.

== Examples ==
Some of the famous 40 chaupais (known as "chalisa");

- Hanuman Chalisa
- Ganesh Chalisa
- Shiv Chalisa

== See also ==
- Chhand (poetry)
- Chaupai (Sikhism)
