= C. G. Rajagopal =

Indian Malayalam-language writer and translator

- Born: 21 May 1932; Travancore, British India
- Died: August 2, 2024 (aged 92)
- Occupations: Poet, Translator
- Writing career
- Notable work: Malayalam translation of Tulasidasasa Ramayana
- Notable awards: Sahitya Akademi Translation Prize 2019

C. G. Rajagopal was a polyglot, poet and translator from Kerala, India. He received many awards including the Sahitya Akademi Translation Prize 2019, a literary honour in India, presented by Sahitya Akademi, India's National Academy of Letters.

His main literary contribution is Malayalam translation of Tulsidas's Ramcharitmanas (Thulasidasa Ramayana), which has 26152 lines and 46 Sanskrit verses.

== Biography ==
Rajagopal was born on 21 May 1932 to C. S. Gopalakaimal and K. Parukutty Amma at Neeretupuram of Kuttanad Thalavadi in present-day Alappuzha district of Kerala, India. He studied intermediate at SN College, Kollam. Although he enrolled for BA in Malayalam in University College Thiruvananthapuram, he later switched to Hindi. He graduated from University College with first rank in Hindi and went to Lucknow for higher studies. He went to Lucknow University on a scholarship given by the Government of India to students from non-Hindi states to study Hindi, and passed MA from there with a gold medal.

=== Personal life and death ===
Rajagopal and his wife T. Vijayalakshmi have two daughters. He resided in his house called 'Shaleenam' on PRS Road, Thykkad, Thiruvananthapuram. He died on August 2, 2024.

== Career ==
Rajagopal, who returned from Lucknow after his higher studies, first became a lecturer at Pala St. Thomas College. Then he served as Hindi lecturer in Government Arts College, Thiruvananthapuram, Victoria College, Palakkad and then as Head of Department at Brennan College, Thalassery and University College Thiruvananthapuram. In 1986 he retired as the Principal of Thrissur Govt. Arts College. Later, from 1993 to 1996, he became the Dean of the Department of Non-Sanskrit Indian Languages at the Sree Sankaracharya Sanskrit University.

Rajagopal, who was also a lover of Kathakali, was the founder president of Drishyavedi, a Kathakali entertainment organization in Thiruvananthapuram. He also served as the president of Tapasya and Bharatiya Vicharakendra.

== Literary career ==
Rajagopal's main literary work is the Malayalam translation of Tulsidas's Hindi work Sri Ramacharitamanasam (Thulasidasa Ramayanam). Other contributions include Nadatrayam (Poetry Collection), Bharata Brihad Tarika (Translation), Bharathiya Samskarathinu Jaina Mathathinte Sambhavana (Contribution of Jain Religion to Indian Culture) (Study) and a Hindi-English-Malayalam Trilingual Dictionary. The ghazal he composed in 1958 was the first in that field in Malayalam. He is now writing Ayyappacharitam (story of lord Ayyappan) in the form of Aattakatha.

Rajagopal completed the translation of Tulasidasasa Ramayana, which has 26152 lines and 46 Sanskrit verses, in five and a half years. Thulasidasasa Ramayana, written in verse by Rajagopal, was sung and recorded by eight singers including Kavalam Sreekumar, G. Sreeram, and his elder brother's son and singer Suresh Thenmala. Composed by P Sushila Devi, it is a forty-six hours long poetry recitation.

His book called Nadathrayam containing sixteen poems including Shilpi was a textbook for the Malayalam Vidwan course and Malayalam BA course.

== Awards and honours ==
- 2019 Sahitya Akademi Translation Prize for the translation of Tulasidasasa Ramayana
- 2020 Vivarthana Ratna Award by Bharat Bhavan, a cultural exchange center of the Government of Kerala for the translation of Tulasidasa Ramayana.
- Prof. Thuravoor Vishwambharan Memorial Award of Tapasya Kala Sahityavedi, for his contributions to translation literature and creative writings.
- Special award from the Vallathol Sahithya Samithi for the translation of Thulaseedasa Ramayanam to Malayalam.
