= Ramcharitmanas =

Awadhi poem about Rama by Tulsidas

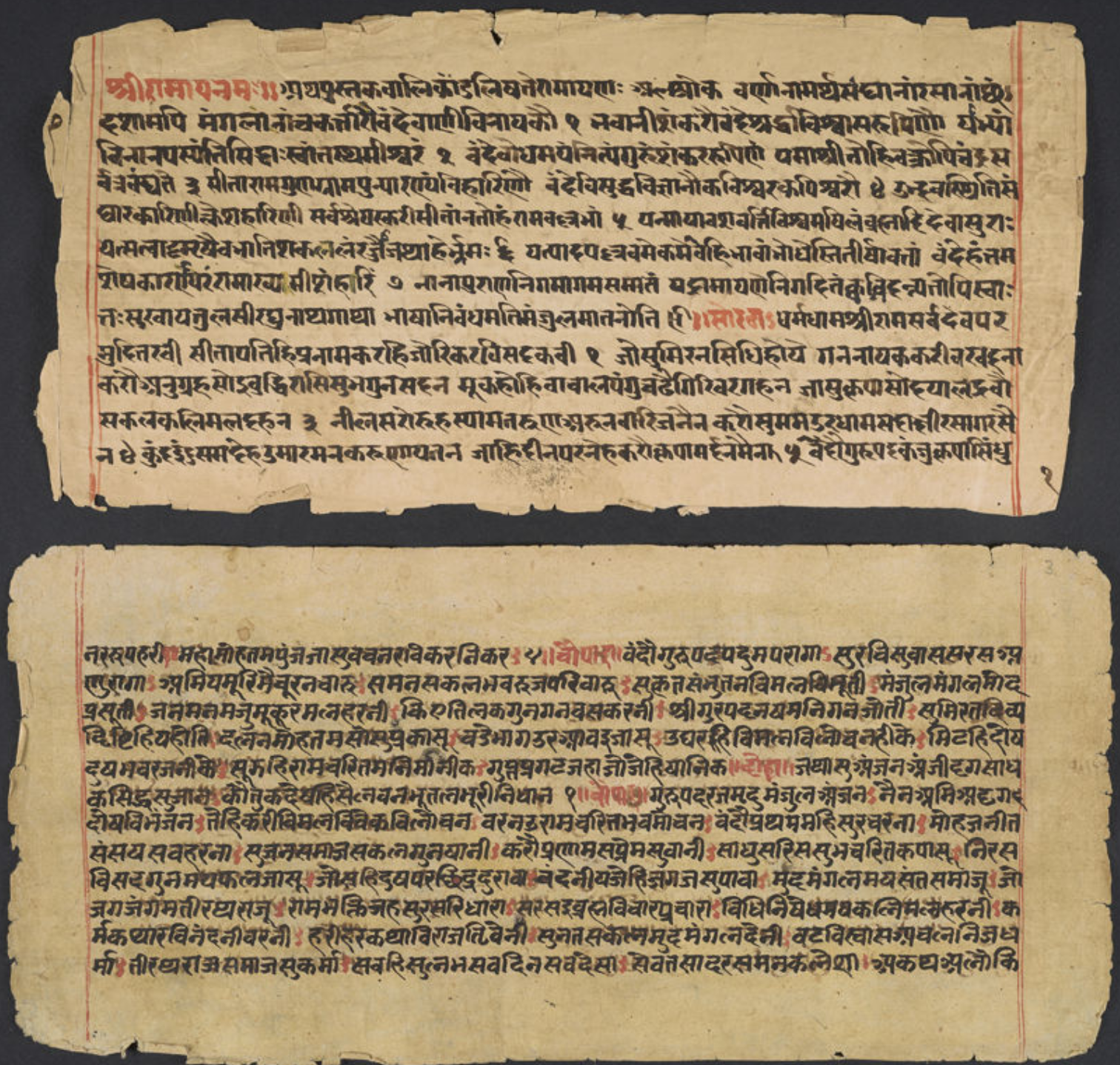
- A 19th century manuscript of the Ramcharitmanas

Information
- Religion: Hinduism
- Author: Tulsidas
- Language: Awadhi
- Chapters: 7 Khands/Sopans
- Verses: 10,902

Ramcharitmanas (Devanagari: रामचरितमानस rāmacaritamānasa), is an epic poem in the Awadhi language, composed by the 16th-century Indian bhakti poet Tulsidas (c. 1511–1623). It has many inspirations, the primary being the Ramayana of Valmiki.

This work is also called, in popular parlance, Tulsi Ramayana, Tulsikrit Ramayana, Tulsidas Ramayana or simply Manas. The word Ramcharitmanas literally means "Lake of the deeds of Rama". It is considered one of the greatest works of Hindu literature. The work has variously been acclaimed as "the living sum of Indian culture", "the tallest tree in the magic garden of medieval Indian poetry", "the greatest book of all devotional literature" and "the best and most trustworthy guide to the popular living faith of the Indian people".

Tulsidas was a great scholar of Sanskrit, but due to limited accessibility of the language, he chose to write it in the vernacular, Awadhi, making his work more accessible to the general public. Tradition has it that Tulsidas had to face much criticism from the Sanskrit scholars of Varanasi for being a vernacular poet. However, Tulsidas remained steadfast in his resolve to simplify the knowledge contained in the Vedas, the Upanishads and the Puranas to the common people. Subsequently, his work was widely accepted.

Ramcharitmanas made available the story of Rama to the common man to sing, meditate and perform on. The writing of Ramcharitmanas also heralded many a cultural tradition, most significantly that of the tradition of Ramlila, the dramatic enactment of the text. Ramcharitmanas is considered by many as a work belonging to the Saguna school of the Bhakti movement (Note: Tulsidas, Kabir, Mirabai, and Surdas are considered the greatest devotional poets of Bhakti kāl) in Hindi literature.

In May 2024, during the tenth meeting of the Memory of the World Committee for Asia and the Pacific, the Ramcharitamanas manuscripts were added to UNESCO's Memory of the World Asia-Pacific Regional Register. One manuscript was authored by Tulsidas, and the other was written in Arabic in the 18th century, showcasing the text's appeal in West Asia and other parts of the world.

== Background ==
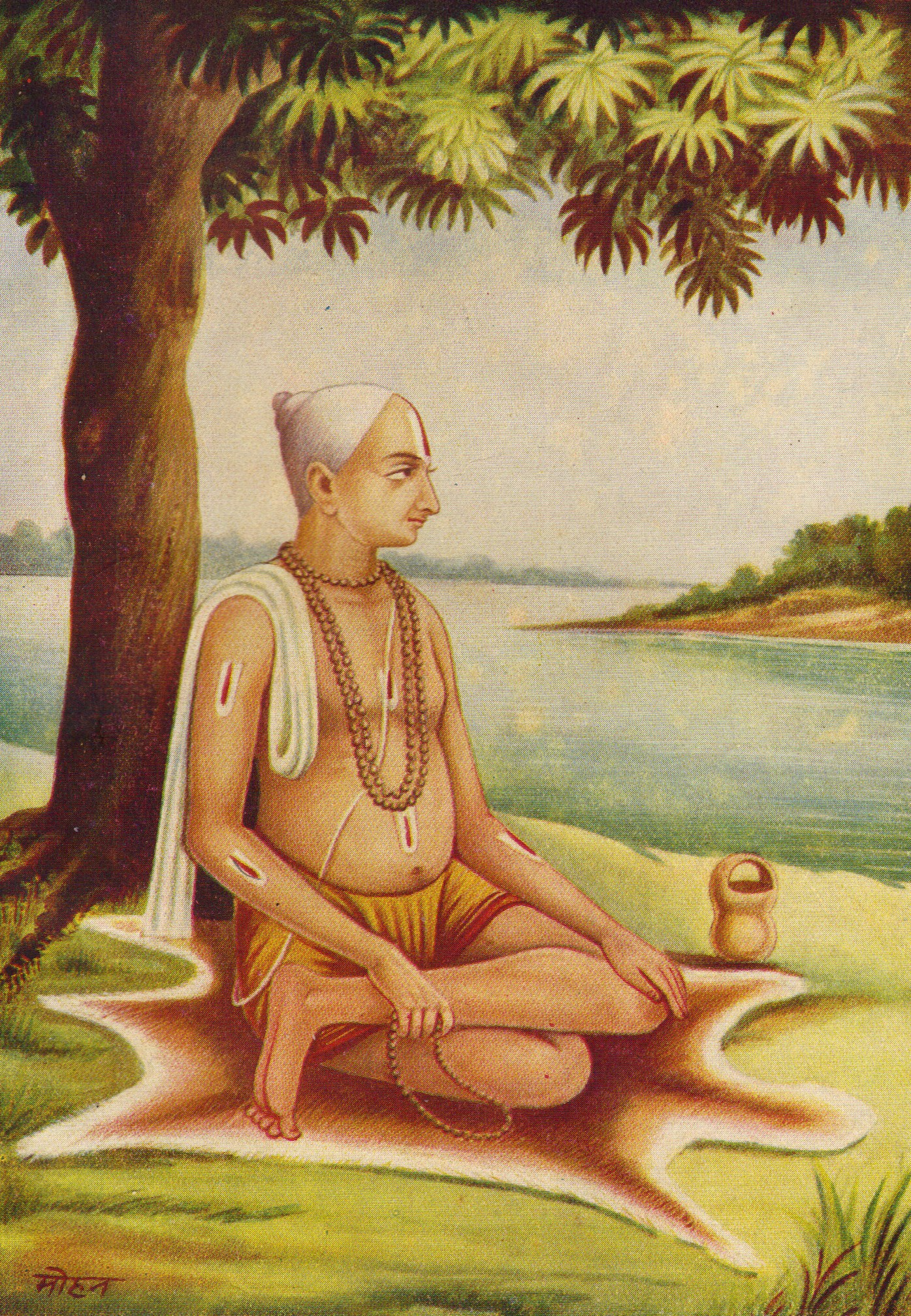
Picture of author, Tulsidas published in the Ramcharitmanas, 1949.

Tulsidas began writing the Ramcharitmanas in Ayodhya in Vikram Samvat 1631 (1574 CE). (Note: In verse 1.33.2 of Bālkānd, the first chapter of Rāmcaritmanas, Tulsidas mentions 1631, Tuesday, as the date according to Vikram Samvat calendar, which is 1574 in Gregorian calendar or Common Era.) The exact date is stated within the poem as being the ninth day of the month of Chaitra, which is the birthday of Rama or Rama Navami. Ramcharitmanas was composed at Ayodhya, Varanasi and Chitrakoot.

The Ramcharitmanas is written in vernacular Awadhi language. The core of the work is considered by some to be a poetic retelling of the events of the Sanskrit epic Ramayana^{[1]} by Valmiki. The Valmiki Ramayana is centered on the narrative of Rama. Rama was the crown prince of Ayodhya and is considered in Hindu tradition as the seventh avatar of Vishnu. However, the Ramacharitmanas is by no means a replica of the Valmiki Ramayana nor an abridged re-telling of it. Ramcharitmanas has elements from many other Ramayanas written earlier in Sanskrit, and other Indian dialects as well as stories from Puranas. Tulsidas is said to have some spiritual powers to see the events occurred till Tretayuga that he used to narrate Ramcharitmanas. He calls the epic Ramcharitmanas as the story of Rama, which was narrated by Shiva to his wife, Parvati. Tulsidas claims to have received the story through his guru, Narharidas as a child until he wrote it down as the Ramcharitmanas. His guru graciously repeated it again and again so that he could understand and remember it. Then he narrated the story and named it Ramcharitmanas as Shiva himself called it. The epic poem is, therefore, also referred to as Tulsikrit Ramayana (literally, The Ramayana composed by Tulsidas).

== Etymology ==
The word Ramcharitmanas literally means "Lake of the deeds of Rama". Additionally, Phillip Lutgendorf uses W.D.P Hill's English translation of the Ramcharitmanas titled "The Holy Lake of the Acts of Ram." The word Ram refers to the main character of the epic, the Hindu god Rama; carita means "acts or deeds" and manas loosely refers to the "mind or heart." Manas is also a proper noun, referring to a Himalayan lake, thus rendering Hill's entire translation of "The Holy Lake of the Acts of Ram."

== Manuscripts ==
A manuscript of the Ramcharitatmanas dated to 1648 CE is kept at a Hanuman temple in Tulsi Ghat, Varanasi.

Relatively few manuscripts of the epic survive from the seventeenth century, with a much larger number dating from the eighteenth. As many as ten per cent of the early manuscripts are written in Kaithi, the script of the Kayastha scribal caste, and a smaller but significant number in the Persian script; the second-oldest translation of the epic, made in 1804, was into Persian. Lutgendorf takes this as evidence of the text's early popularity among aristocratic and mercantile groups, and suggests that its acceptance by Brahmans as a work of the highest religious authority came about only gradually.

The first printed edition of the Ramcharitmanas appeared in Calcutta in 1810, where popular publishing in Hindi and Bengali had begun under the patronage of the Fort William College; editions followed from Kanpur (1832), Agra (1849), Meerut (1851) and Banaras (1853). Later nineteenth-century editions grew in size as they added introductory matter, glossaries, line-by-line prose paraphrases and commentaries, and editions printed in Gurmukhi script (from about 1870), in Bengali script with Bengali commentaries (from the 1880s) and in Gujarati (in the following decade) indicate the text's spread beyond its linguistic homeland.

== Structure ==
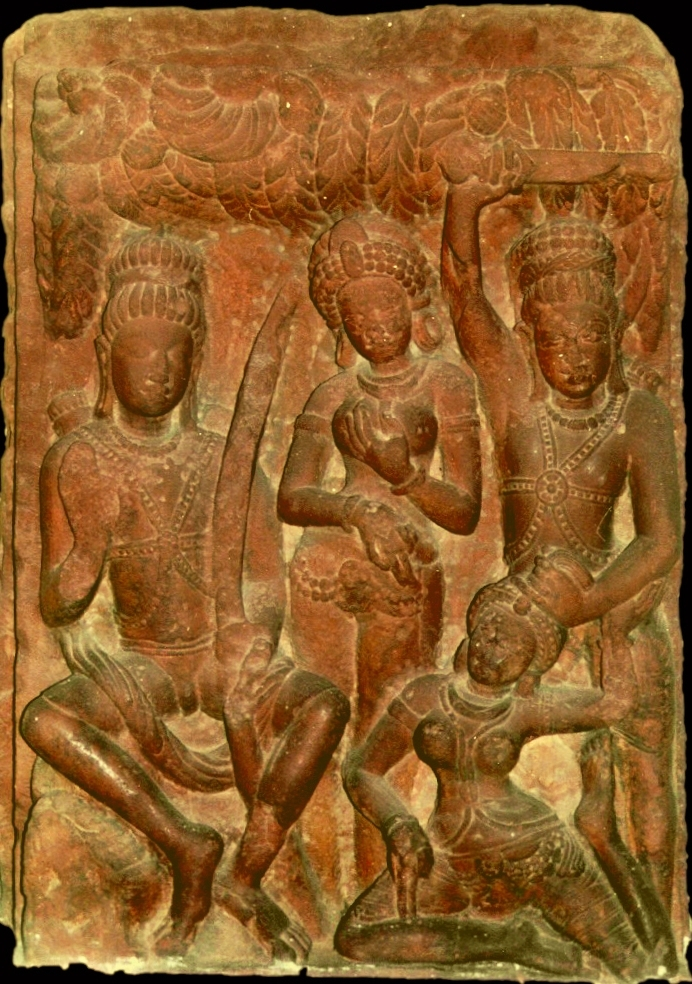
Scene Ramayana, Gupta art

Ramcharitmanas consists of seven Kānds (literally "books" or "episodes", cognate with cantos) and composed of approximately 12,800 lines, divided into 1,073 stanzas. Tulsidas compared the seven Kāndas of the epic to seven steps leading into the holy waters of Lake Manasarovar "which purifies the body and the soul at once".

The first two parts, Bāl Kāṇḍ (Childhood Episode) and Ayodhyā Kāṇḍ (Ayodhya Episode), make up more than half of the work. The other parts are Araṇya Kāṇḍ (Forest Episode), Kiśkindhā Kāṇḍ (Kishkindha Episode), Sundar Kāṇḍ (Pleasant Episode), Laṅkā Kāṇḍ (Lanka Episode), and Uttar Kāṇḍ (Later Episode). The work is primarily composed in the Chaupai metre (four-line quatrains), separated by the Doha metre (two-line couplets), with occasional Soratha and various Chhand metres.

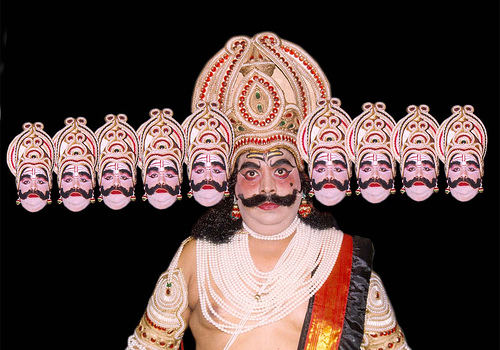
A Ramlila actor playing Ravana in traditional attire.

=== Invocations ===
Every chapter of the Ramcharitmanas begins with an invocation or Mangalācharaņ. It is customary in the Indian tradition of writing for the author to begin a new book with invocation to the gods to ensure that the sankalpa is finished unhindered. The first three or four verses of each Kānd are typically in the form of invocations.

Bāl Kāṇḍ begins with a hymn honouring the goddess Saraswati and the god Ganesha, the deities related to knowledge, wisdom, speech and auspiciousness. The deities Lord Shiva, Lord Rama, and Goddess Sita are also honoured in succeeding verses. In the Pushpavatika Nireekshan chapter, the detailed description of the legendary garden Baag Taraag Pushpavatika is explained.

Ayodhyā Kāṇḍ begins with the famous verse dedicated to the god Shiva: May He in whose lap shines forth Parvati, the daughter of the mountain-king, who carries the celestial stream Ganga on His head, on whose brow rests the crescent moon, whose throat holds deadly poison & whose breast is graced by serpent-king, & who is adorned by the ashes on His body, may that chief of gods, the Lord of all, the Destroyer of the universe, the omnipresent Shiva, the moon-like Shankar, ever protect me.

Araṇya Kāṇḍ's first verse again extols Shiva: I reverence Bhagavan Śańkara, the progeny of Brahmā, the very root of the tree of piety, the beloved, devotee of King Śri Rama, the full moon that brings joy to the ocean of wisdom, the sun that opens the lotus of dispassion, the wind that disperses the clouds of ignorance, who dispels the thick darkness of sin & eradicates the threefold agony & who wipes off all calumny and obloquy.

Kiśkindhā Kāṇḍ commences with the following verse: Lovely as a jasmine & a blue lotus, of surpassing strength, repositories of wisdom, endowed with natural grace, excellent bowmen, hymned by the Vedas, & lovers of the cow & the host of Brāhmaņas, who appeared in the form of mortal men through their own Māyā (deluding potency) as the two noble scions of Raghu's lineage, the armours of true dharma, friendly to all & journeying in quest for Sita, may they Sri Rama & Laksmana both grant us Devotion.

Sundar Kāṇḍ begins with a hymn in the praise of Rama: I adore the Lord of the universe bearing the name of Rama, the chief of the Raghu's line & the crest-jewel of kings, the mine of compassion, the dispeller of all sins, appearing in human form through His Māyā (deluding potency), the greatest of all gods, knowable through Vedānta (the Upanishads), constantly worshiped by Brahmā (the Creator), Śhambhu (Śivā), & Śeşa (the serpent-god), the bestower of supreme peace in the form of final beatitude, placid, eternal, beyond the ordinary means of cognition, sinless & all-pervading.

Laṅkā Kāṇḍ begins with this hymn: I adore Śri Rama, the supreme Deity, the object of worship even of Śivā (the destroyer of Cupid), the Dispeller of the fear of rebirth, the lion to quell the mad elephant in the form of Death, the Master of Yogīs, attainable through knowledge, the repository of good qualities, unconquerable, attributeless, immutable, beyond the realm of Māyā, the Lord of celestials, intent on killing the evil-doers, the only protector of the Brāhmaņas, beautiful & dark complexioned as a cloud laden with moisture, who has lotus-like eyes & Supreme Brahma, who appeared in the form of an earthly king.

Uttar Kāṇḍ begins with the following hymn: I unceasingly adore Śri Ramā, the praiseworthy lord of Jānakī, the chief of Raghu's lineage, possessed of a form greenish blue as the neck of a peacock & adorned with a print of Brahmāna's lotus-foot, which testifies to His being the greatest of all gods, rich in splendour, clad in yellow robes, lotus-eyed, ever-propitious, holding a bow & arrow in His hands, mounted on the aerial car named Puşpakā, accompanied by a host of monkeys & waited upon by His own brother Lakşmaņa.

=== Kānd endings ===
Tulsidas ends every chapter in a similar manner describing the ending in the Sanskrit language.

Every Kānd is formally concluded by Goswami Tulsidas. The following is an example of the ending of Kiśkindhā Kāṇḍ:

"Iti Srimadramacharitamanase sakalakalikalusavidhvamsane caturthah sopanah samaptah."

Translation: "Thus ends the fourth descent into the Mānasa lake of Sri Rama's exploits, that eradicate all the impurities of the Kali age." All the other Kāndas are concluded in the same way where the word caturthah is substituted, according to the Kānd being concluded.

== Narrative ==
Ramcharitmanas is structured around three separate conversations. The conversations happen between Shiva and Parvati, Sages Bharadwaj and Yajnavalkya and finally Kakbhushundi and the king of birds, Garuda. Some scholars are of the opinion that there is also an underlying personal conversation between Tulsidas and Lord Rama all through the text of Ramcharitmanas.

=== Bāl Kāṇḍ ===
The Child Episode

Tulsidas begins the story with an invocation to various deities, his guru and saints who have preceded him and those who will succeed him in the future. Homage is paid to Valmiki for bringing the Ramayana to the devotees of Rama. Next, the various characters of the Ramayana are introduced and praised beginning with the birthplace of Rama, the holy city of Ayodhya. Praises are bestowed on Dasharatha, the king of Ayodhya and Rama's father and his queens Kausalya, Kaikeyi and Sumitra. Tulsidas then praises King Janaka (the father-in-law of Rama), and his family. He goes on to praise the brothers of Rama - Bharata, Lakshman and Shatrughna and sings the glories of Hanuman, the constant companion to Rama, Sugriva, the monkey king and Jambavan, the leader of bears. Next, the characters of Sita and Rama are introduced.

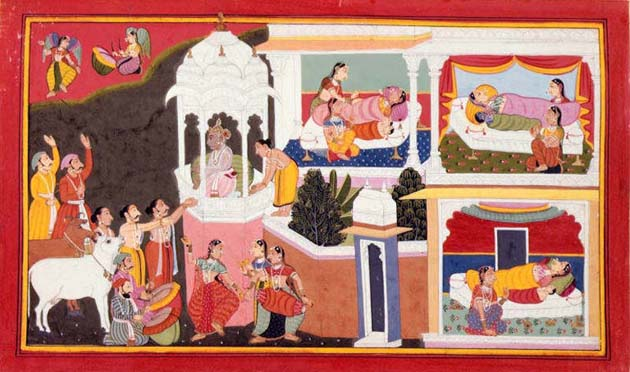
The birth of the four sons of Dasharatha.

The story of Ramcharitmanas is then underway. It begins with the meeting of two sages - Bharadwaj and Yajnavalkya. Bharadwaj asks Yajnavalkya to narrate in detail the story of Rama. Yajnavalkya begins with how Shiva came about retelling the story of Rama to his wife Parvati. (The story of Sati's self-immolation, the destruction of her father Daksha's sacrifice, the rebirth of Sati as Parvati and her marriage to Shiva). Shiva explains five different reasons as to why Rama incarnated on earth in different ages or Kalpa (aeon). Each of these stories is discussed in detail, with the primary message being that Rama incarnated on earth to protect the righteous who followed the path of Dharma. The story then moves to the birth of Ravana and his brothers. Following this, the narration is done at different times by Shiva, Yajnavalkya, Kakbhushundi and Tulsidas.

The story now moves to the abode of Brahma where Brahma and the other Hindu Devas (transl. deities) are found mulling on the ways to rid the earth of Ravana and his excesses. Unable to find a solution, they pray to Shiva and ask him for his guidance on where to find the supreme God who will come to their rescue. Shiva tells them that they don't need to go anywhere to find the Supreme God for he resides in the hearts of his devotees. All the Devas then pray to the supreme Brahman/Vishnu to rid the earth of the demons wreaking havoc on men as well as Devas. Brahman shows compassion to all and announces in an Akashvani that he will be born in the Sun Dynasty to save the Devas and his devotees from the demons.

The story then moves to Ayodhya. One fine day, Dasharatha, the king of Ayodhya, realizes that he has become old and still without children. He conveys his distress to sage Vasistha, the family guru, and seeks the way forward. Vasistha comforts Dasharatha and tells him that he will have four sons. Vasistha requests Rishyasringa to perform the Putrakām yajna (vedic yajna for the birth of sons). Tulsidas states that the birth of Rama and his brothers took place on the ninth day of the Chaitra month. It was the fortnight of the moon, known as the shukla period.

The story then moves on and Rama and his brothers are now grown-up boys. The sage Vishvamitra arrives at Dasharatha's royal court where the King receives his eminent guest with great honour. Vishvamitra lived in the forest and was performing great sacrifices. However, the demons Maricha and Subahu would always desecrate the ceremonial offerings. He knew that Rama had taken birth on earth to protect his devotees and so he decided to visit Dasharatha to ask him a favor. The sage asks the king to let his sons accompany him to the forest. Reluctantly the king agrees. Rama knew beforehand the intention of Vishvamitra in asking him to come along with him. He assures the sage that he would obey his commands. Lakshman kills Subahu and Rama kills Tataka and defeats Maricha, the dreaded demons.

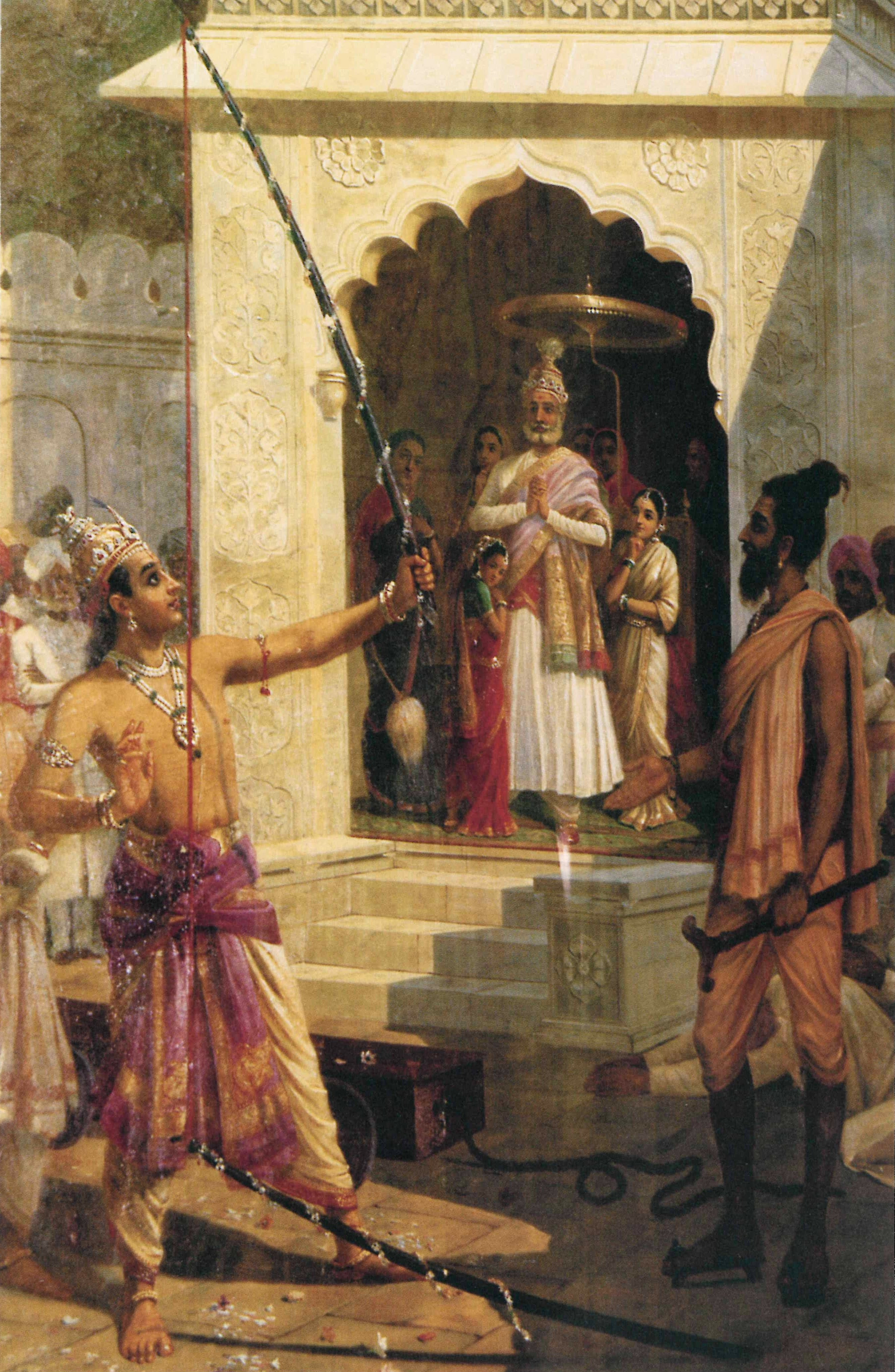
Vishvamitra looks as Ram breaks the bow, to win the hand of Sita in marriage.

The story then moves to the deliverance of Ahalya. Rama, Lakshman and Vishvamitra venture on a journey and reach the beautiful kingdom of the Videhas, Mithila. The king of Mithila, Janaka, welcomes the great sage and asks him who are the two boys accompanying him. Janaka is overcome by great emotion as he is able to sense the true nature of their mission. The brothers then set out to discover the beautiful city and visit Janaka's garden. This is an important section of the Ramcharitmanas as it portrays the first meeting of Rama and Sita.

In the meanwhile, King Janaka arranges a swayamvara ceremony for his daughter Sita. A swayamvara ceremony is a Vedic ritual in which a prospective bride selects her groom from among a group of suitors who attend the ceremony. Sita falls in love with Rama at first sight in Janaka's garden and prays to Parvati that she may get Rama as her husband. King Janaka sends a messenger to invite Rama, Laksman and Sage Vishvamitra to attend the swayamvara. Janaka puts a condition to identify the right groom for Sita. The great bow of Shiva by the name of Pinaka was kept in the arena. Any suitor who would be able to string Pinaka would be married to Sita. Many princes tried but failed to even nudge the bow. This caused great distress to Janaka who wonders aloud if the earth has become devoid of brave men. This statement of Janaka angers Lakshman who retorts that no one should talk in this vain manner, when a gathering like this, has the presence of scions of the Sun Dynasty. Rama gently nudges him to keep calm as Vishwamitra asks him to break the bow and make Janaka happy once again. Rama steps in and effortlessly lifts and strings the divine bow. In a swift move, he breaks the bow. The breaking of Pinaka causes a great noise that disturbs the great sage Parashurama in his meditation and he storms into the swayamvara arena in great anger vowing to kill whoever had dared to break the bow of lord Shiva. Lakshman enters into an argument with Parashurama, paying scant respect to the sage who was known for his bursts of anger and was known to slay whoever dared to oppose him. Ultimately, Rama brings him around. Parashurama discovers the real nature of Lord Rama as the ultimate Brahman, pays his respects and leaves for the forests for meditation. Sita places the wreath of victory around the neck of Rama in accordance with the rules of the swayamvara and is thus wedded to him.

However, Sita being his beloved daughter, Janaka desired to conduct a grand marriage of Sita and Rama in accordance with both Vedic and laukik (traditional) customs. Janaka dispatches messengers to Ayodhya to inform Dasharatha and his family about the marriage of Rama and Sita and invites them for the formal consummation of the marriage ceremony. Dasharatha starts with a great marriage procession, consisting of Rama's family, friends and well wishers in addition to Shiva, Brahma and all Devas arrive in Mithila. Along with Rama-Sita, Bharat-Mandavi, Lakshman-Urmila and Shatrughna-Shrutakirti's marriages are also arranged.

After a wedding, the kind of which had never been witnessed in the universe, Rama and Sita return to Ayodhya where there was a celebration and rejoicing.

=== Ayodha Kāṇḍ ===
The Ayodhya Episode

Ayodhya was described as being like a heaven on earth ever since Rama and Sita came back from Mithila. As King Dasharatha was getting old, he wanted to install his son Rama as Prince Regent. He decided to start the ceremonies for his coronation the very next day. The Devas however became very concerned at the prospect of Rama remaining in Ayodhya and not pursuing the wicked Ravana, and vanquishing him. Something had to happen if Rama was to embark on his mission to rid the world of Ravana. They approached Goddess Saraswati for help.

King Dasharatha had three wives. Queen Kaushalya is the principal queen and the mother of Rama. Queen Kaikeyi is the mother of Bharata and Queen Sumitra is the mother of Lakshman and Shatrughna. Saraswati decides to influence the mind of one of Queen Kaikeyi's maid servants named Manthara. Manthara's mind harbors evil intentions and she begins to talk to Queen Kaikeyi in harsh and conceited tones. She finds fault with Kaikeyi for being supportive of the king's plan of installing Rama as Prince Regent when her own mind tells her that Bharata would clearly be a greater king. At that time Bharata is visiting his uncle and so he is unaware of what is happening in Ayodhya. Slowly, Queen Kaikeyi becomes influenced. Manthara reminds Queen Kaikeyi of the two boons that the King had promised her. Kaikeyi enters the private room in the royal palace, where the King gives audience to his queens and awaits Dasharatha. Dasharatha is greatly alarmed and concerned that Kaikeyi is sitting in the sulking chamber, while the entire population of Ayodhya is greatly happy and eagerly anticipating the coronation of Rama. Queen Kaikeyi reminds him of the two boons he promised her and to his bewilderment, asks him to install her son Bharata as Prince Regent and send Rama into the forest for fourteen years. Queen Kaikeyi is unmoved by Dasharatha's lamentations and finally the king emotionally breaks down. The king's assistant Sumantra sends for Rama with a request to meet his father.

Queen Kaikeyi speaks to Rama and explains to him the boons that she had asked of his father. Rama is actually the Supreme Personality of Godhead incarnated on earth, yet he accepts his stepmother's request and decides to leave the kingdom as it serves his purpose as well. The people of Ayodhya remonstrate against Queen Kaikeyi who firmly believes that she is doing the right thing. Rama attempts to dissuade Lakshman and Sita from joining him but is unable to do so. The scene becomes very emotional as Rama, Sita and Lakshman greet their mothers before finally going to Dashratha to take leave of him. Dasharatha attempts, in vain, to try to talk Sita out of joining Rama in the forest.

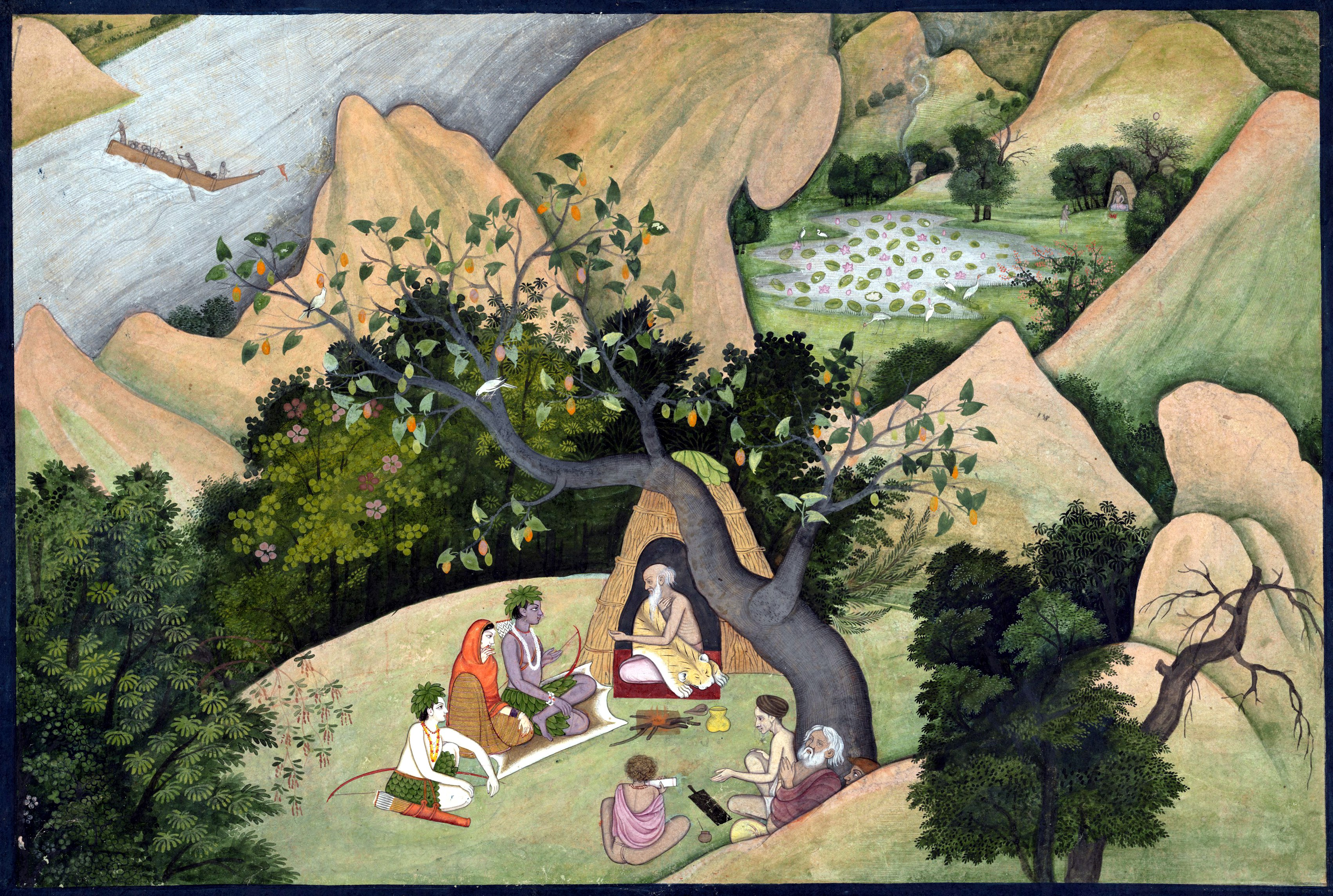
Rama, Sita and Lakshman meeting Sage Bharadwaj at his ashram in Prayag.

The residents of Ayodhya can't spare the thought of being away from Rama and decide to join him in the forest. Rama, Sita, Lakshman and Sumantra go incognito and in the dead of the night leave the city and head for the forest. They leave for a place called Sringaverapur after which they meet Guha, the Nishad king. They arrive at Prayag, the holy city where the Rivers Ganges, Yamuna and Saraswati meet. Rama meets with the Sage Bharadwaj at his ashram. Rama is overwhelmed with the reception and love shown by the people inhabiting the banks of the Yamuna. Rama then meets Sage Valmiki, the author of the Ramayan at Chitrakoot dham. Valmiki recognises the true opulence of Rama and sings his praises. At this point Tulsidas takes great care to describe the beauty of the land of Chitrakoot with some inspiring poetry.

Rama asks Sumantra to return to Ayodhya which saddens Sumantra. He not only wants to stay with Rama, he is also afraid of going back only to face the anger and wrath of the citizens of Ayodhya. Rama persuades him to go back. On returning to Ayodhya, Sumantra meets Dasharatha, who asks him of the whereabouts of Rama. Unable to bear the pain of separation from Rama Dasharatha dies.

Sage Vashishtha knows that Rama will not return to the kingdom and so immediately sends an envoy to call Bharata and Shatrughna back to Ayodhya. Bharata learns of all that has happened and chastises his mother, Queen Kaikeyi. He is greatly pained and blames himself for Rama leaving Ayodhya. He accuses her of bringing ruin to the family. Shatrughna comes across Manthara and beats her in rage. They approach Queen Kaushalya and see her in a sorry state. Bharata begs for her forgiveness and loudly laments while the Queen attempts to pacify him. She asks him to carry out his duty and rule Ayodhya, but Bharata cannot bear the thought of sitting on the throne with his father dead and his brothers in exile in the forest. The cremation of King Dasharatha takes place. Bharata and Shatrughna decide to go into the forest and ask Rama to return to Ayodhya and take the throne. Many citizens as well as the royal family, who have been grieving ever since Rama had left them, decide to join the brothers.

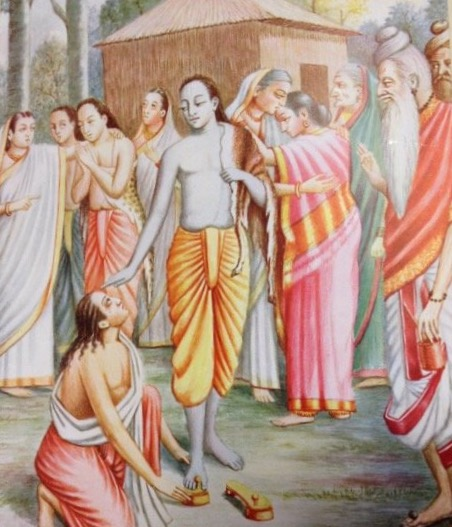
Bharata asks for Rama's paduka (footwear).

The Nishads see the approaching royal party and become suspicious. Guha approaches Bharata to understand his motive for bringing such a large party to the forest. He assumes that Bharata has some sinister motive. Bharata shows his love for Rama and Guha is moved to tears by his love for his brother. The royal procession then moves forward to Chitrakoot. Lakshman sees the huge army of people with Bharata and immediately begins to chastise Bharata. Rama counters this by praising the greatness of Bharata, leaving Lakshman feeling sorry for his harsh words. Bharata finally arrives at Chitrakoot where the brothers are all reunited once again. They collectively mourn the passing of their father and perform his Shraddha (obsequies) along with Sage Vashistha leading the ceremony.

Despite all of Bharata's convincing, Rama is true to the word given to his father and step mother Kaikeyi, and vows that he will fulfill her wish. Bharata says that he simply cannot sit on the throne while Rama wanders in the forest. He asks Rama for his sandals, which he would place at the throne and would only act as Rama's representative and not as a full-fledged king.

With much sorrow and hurt, Bharata leaves Rama and returns to Ayodhya. He decides that he would not live in the kingdom while Rama is in exile and so lives like a hermit in a nearby town called Nandigram.

=== Araṇya Kāṇḍ ===
The Forest Episode

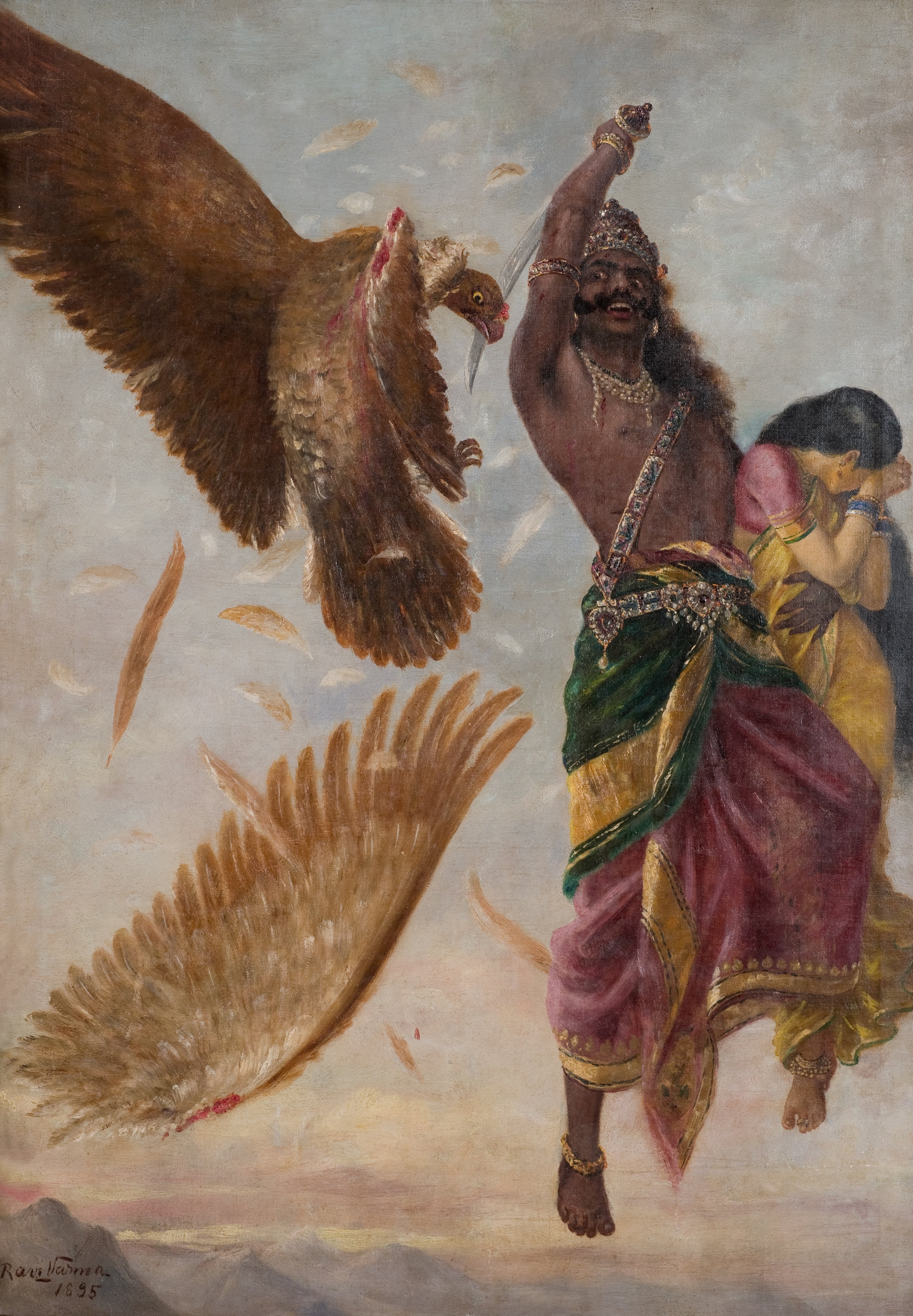
Ravana fights Jatayu as he carries off the kidnapped Sita.

Rama, Sita and Lakshman wander in the forest and come across the hermitage of a sage called Atri. Atri sees them approaching and is overcome with great joy. Sita is embraced by Atri's wife, Anasuya. Anusuya talks to Sita at length about the duties of a devoted wife.

Rama, Sita and Lakshman venture further into the forest and encounter Viradha. Viradha attempts to capture Sita. Rama kills him by burying him in a ditch. They then visit the ashram of Sage Sarabhanga. Rama asks him of where he should go for shelter in the forest. He is advised to visit the sage Sutiksna. As Rama approaches Sutiksna, the latter comes out of his meditation. He tells Rama that he had been awaiting his arrival and had even turned down the offer of entering the heavenly planets.

Thirteen years pass. Continuing on their journey through the forest, they meet with Sage Agastya where Rama pays his respect to the sage. Agastya gifts divine weapons to Rama and advises him to venture further into the forest and into the region of Dandaka. Rama meets with the eagle, Jatayu. Rama, Sita and Lakshman take up abode at Panchavati and build a beautiful ashram, as per the advice of Agastya. Lakshman becomes nostalgic of the past and begins to talk harshly about Kaikeyi. Rama pacifies him and explains that it is sinful to speak of his mother in such a way.

The story takes a new turn, as Rama, Sita and Lakshman are approached by the sister of the demon-king Ravana, called Surpanakha. She immediately takes a liking to Rama and falls in love with him. She disguises herself and talks to Rama in sweet tones. Rama rejects her advances explaining that he is already married and advises her to approach Laksman as he is unmarried. However, Laksman also rejects her advances. Surpanakha takes it as a great insult to be spurned like this, and attempts to hurt Sita. Laksman takes hold of his sword and lops off Surpanakha's ear lobes and nose. Feeling humiliated, Surpanakha leaves the forest and goes to the abode of her brothers Khara and Dusana. They are angry at the treatment meted out to their sister and leave with the intention of killing Rama. Both the brothers are vanquished by Rama.

Surpanakha is greatly upset and visits Ravana at his residence in Lanka. She explains all that has happened, after which Ravana calls for his old friend Maricha. Ravana hatches a plot and asks Maricha to disguise himself as a golden deer, so that Ravana may then kidnap Sita. Maricha has already felt the power of Rama (as mentioned in Bālakāṇḍa) and is apprehensive, however, he thinks that he is going to die either way since Ravana will kill him in rage for refusing him. Ravana and Marich immediately leave for Rama's forest abode.

Maricha takes his position and instantly Sita is attracted by his deer form. Rama knows that Ravana's intentions and orders Sita to place her shadow (Maya Sita) in her place, while she would hide in the fire. She asks Rama time and time again to hunt for the deer and bring it to her. Rama runs after the deer and is soon quite a far distance away from the ashram. Rama releases an arrow and hits the deer. Impersonating Rama's voice, Marich shouts out to Lakshman to help him. Maya Sita (hereafter called simply Sita) hears the cry and orders Laksman to go help his brother. Ravana, while posing as a begging minstrel, uses this opportunity to forcibly kidnap Sita from the ashram.

Jatayu, the eagle, sees Ravana's sinful act and attempts to fight with him, but Ravana has too much power and cuts off Jatayu's wings and leaves him for dead. Rama and Lakshman return to find the ashram empty. They anxiously set out to find Sita and find the severely wounded eagle. Jatayu dies in Rama's lap and receives liberation.

As they continue to look for Sita they come across the hermitage of Shabari. Tulsidas says that Shabari washes the feet of Ram with tears from her eyes and feeds him half eaten wild berries to ensure he gets only sweet ones. She is given liberation by Rama. The brothers then head towards the Pampasarovar lake.

=== Kiśkindhā Kāṇḍ ===
The Kiśkindhā Region Episode

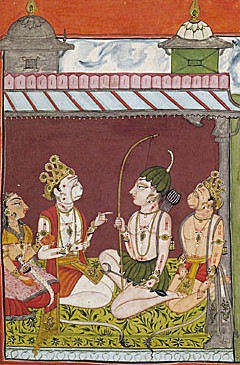
Lakshman meets with Tara, Sugriva and Hanuman in the Palace of Kishkandha

High up in the Rishyamukha mountains, Sugriva sees Rama and Laksman at the foothills. He consults Hanuman as to whether he thinks they have been sent by his brother Bali. Hanuman disguises himself as a Brahmin and approaches the brothers. Hanuman recognises the true nature of Rama as God-incarnation and surrenders himself to his Holy feet. He tells the brothers that his king, Sugriva, wishes to extend his friendship to them and will help them to find Sita. Rama asks Sugriva why he resides in the mountains instead of Kishkindha, where Sugriva tells of his feud with his brother Bali. Rama sympathises with Sugriva and decides to help Sugriva in return for the latter's help in finding Sita. Rama kills Bali and installs Sugriva as king of Kishkindha and Angada, Bali's son, as prince regent.

Sugriva becomes too attached to his new regal lifestyle and forgets about his agreement with Rama, which fills Rama with great anger. Rama asks Lakshman to bring Sugriva to him. Lakshman enters the royal court and threatens to burn the entire city to ashes. Sugriva is gravely worried and asks Hanuman to pacify him. Lakshman escorts Sugriva to Rama and upon seeing Him, Sugriva falls as his feet and begs forgiveness.

Sugriva immediately orders the gathering of the region's bear and monkey community. Armies of bears and monkeys are dispatched north, south east and west to search for Sita. Rama knew that only Hanuman was really capable of finding Sita. He asks Hanuman to narrate the agony of separation from her and then hands over his ring. Hanuman is joined by Angad, Nala, Nila, Kesari and Jambavan as well as many others as they head to the south. As the army approach the coast, Jambavan and Angad see a cave by the shore of the ocean. The cave is occupied by Sampati (who is actually Jatayu's older brother). There is a conversation during which Angad explains that Jatayu died serving Rama and thereafter Sampati narrates his biography. He tells the monkeys that he is sure that Sita is captive in Ashok Vatika in Lanka. The island is 400 miles away and requires someone who is able to jump the distance. Jambavan deduces that Hanuman is the only one capable of the task.

=== Sundar Kāṇḍ ===
The Pleasant Episode

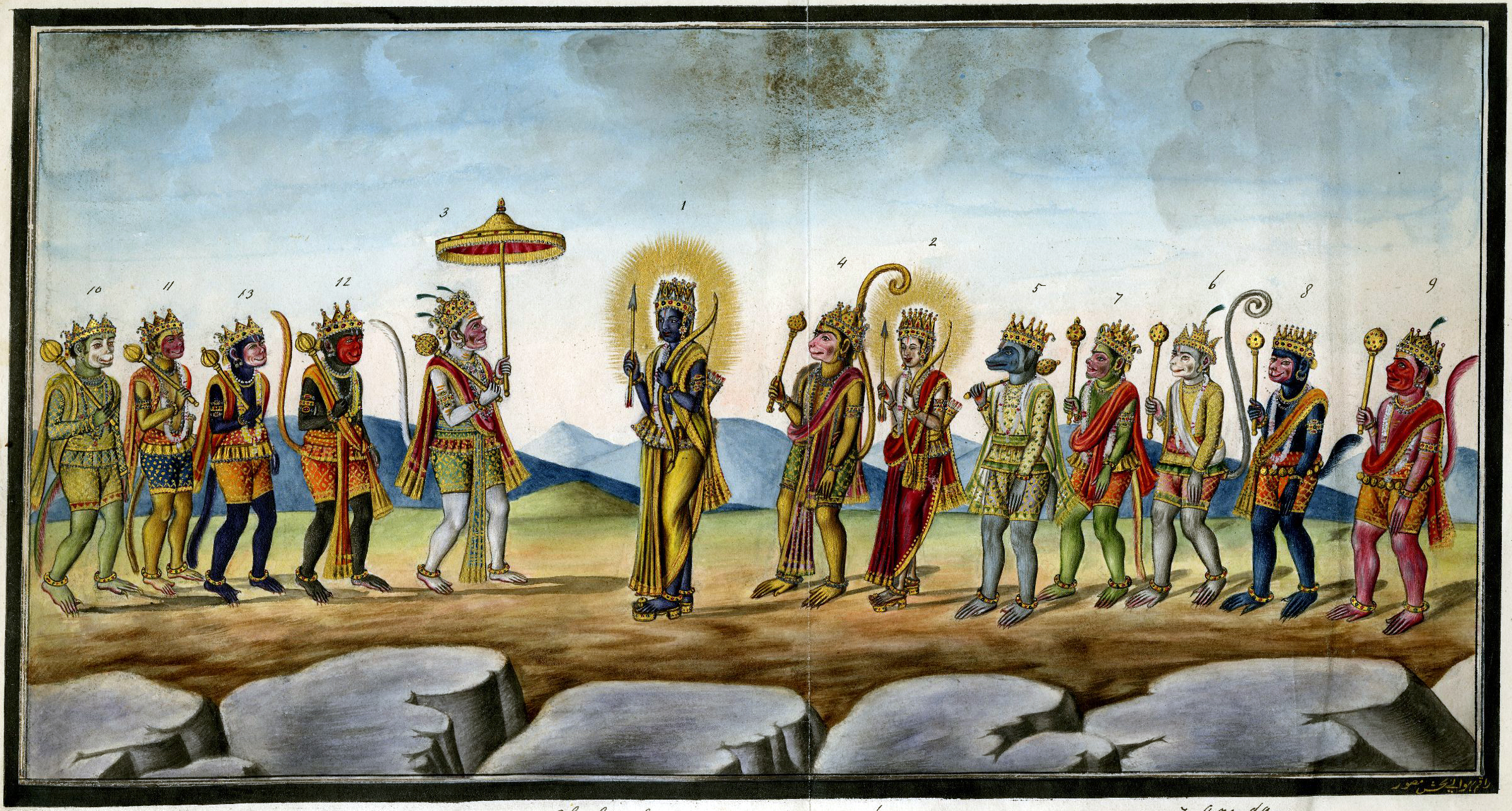
Rama and the monkey chiefs.

Hanuman takes Jambavan's suggestion and immediately takes off for Lanka. He climbs onto the mountain and using it as a pivot, launches himself into the air. He meets Surasa, the mother of serpents and passes her test. The ocean demoness tries to capture Hanuman, thinking of him as a bird. He quickly kills her and then lands on the shore of the ocean in Lanka. He sees beautiful lush gardens, groves, lakes and reservoirs. Hanuman takes a minute form and remembering Rama, enters Lanka. He is accosted by the demon Lankini whom he hits with his fist and causes her to fall to the ground. She recites that curse given to her would cure only when a huge monkey hits her and on the same day the starting of the end of Lankesh Ravan would be marked.

Hanuman flies through the various palaces and gardens for his search of Sita and amongst all the demonic activities going on in Lanka, Hanuman sees a palace where Shri Hari's name is being chanted. He is drawn towards the palace and decides to visit the inhabitant. The palace belongs to Ravana's brother, Vibhishan. Hanuman narrates Rama katha (story) and then introduces himself. Hanuman proceeds to Ashok Vatika where he finally sees Sita. He positions himself on a branch of a tree, under which Sita was sitting and contemplates his next move. He sees Ravana walk towards Sita and beg her to glance at least once toward him. She simply looks at a blade of grass to insult him. Ravana threatens to behead Sita but is calmed down by his wife, Mandodari. Hanuman has to use all his powers of calm not to react to Ravana's threats. When all is quiet again, Hanuman begins to sing the glory of Rama in sweet tones. He then approaches Sita and explains who he is. He presents the ring lord Rama had given him and Sita is overjoyed. She blesses Hanuman with many kind words and boons.

Hanuman tells Sita that he is hungry and asks for her permission to eat fruits from the grove. He not only eats but manages to destroy large parts of it. He easily kills one of Ravana's sons, prince Akshaya. Indrajit arrives in the grove and Hanuman allows himself to be captured. He is brought in front of the king of Lanka, Ravana. Ravana orders his death, however, Vibhishan reminds him that Hanuman is an envoy and cannot be killed according to religious principle. Ravana decides to humiliate Hanuman by setting his tail on fire. Large amounts of clothes are tied to his tail and soaked in oil. Hanuman chants the name of Rama and his tail begins to get longer and more cloth and oil is used. He changes from his small form into a gigantic form and decides to torch alight the whole of Lanka.

He returns to the ocean to extinguish his tail and then goes to Sita to reassure her that the next time she sees him, it will be with Rama. He bids farewell to Sita and leaps back towards Angad and Jambavan. The monkey army then ventures back to where Sugriva, Rama and Lakshman are waiting. On arrival, Hanuman explains all that happened and immediately an army is prepared to go south towards Lanka.

Meanwhile, in Lanka, both Mandodari and Vibhishan ask Ravana to hand Sita back to Rama. Ravana takes great exception to this suggestion and begins to insult Vibhishan particularly. He tells him he has no need for a weakling like him and that he is no longer needed. Vibhishan decides to join Rama at Kishkindha. Vibhishan falls at Ram's feet and asks him for protection.

The army deliberate over how to cross the ocean to Lanka. The deity of the seas tells Rama of the boon obtained by the monkey brothers Nila and Nala and that they have the power to build a bridge to link the seashore to Lanka.

=== Lanka Kāṇḍ ===
The War Episode

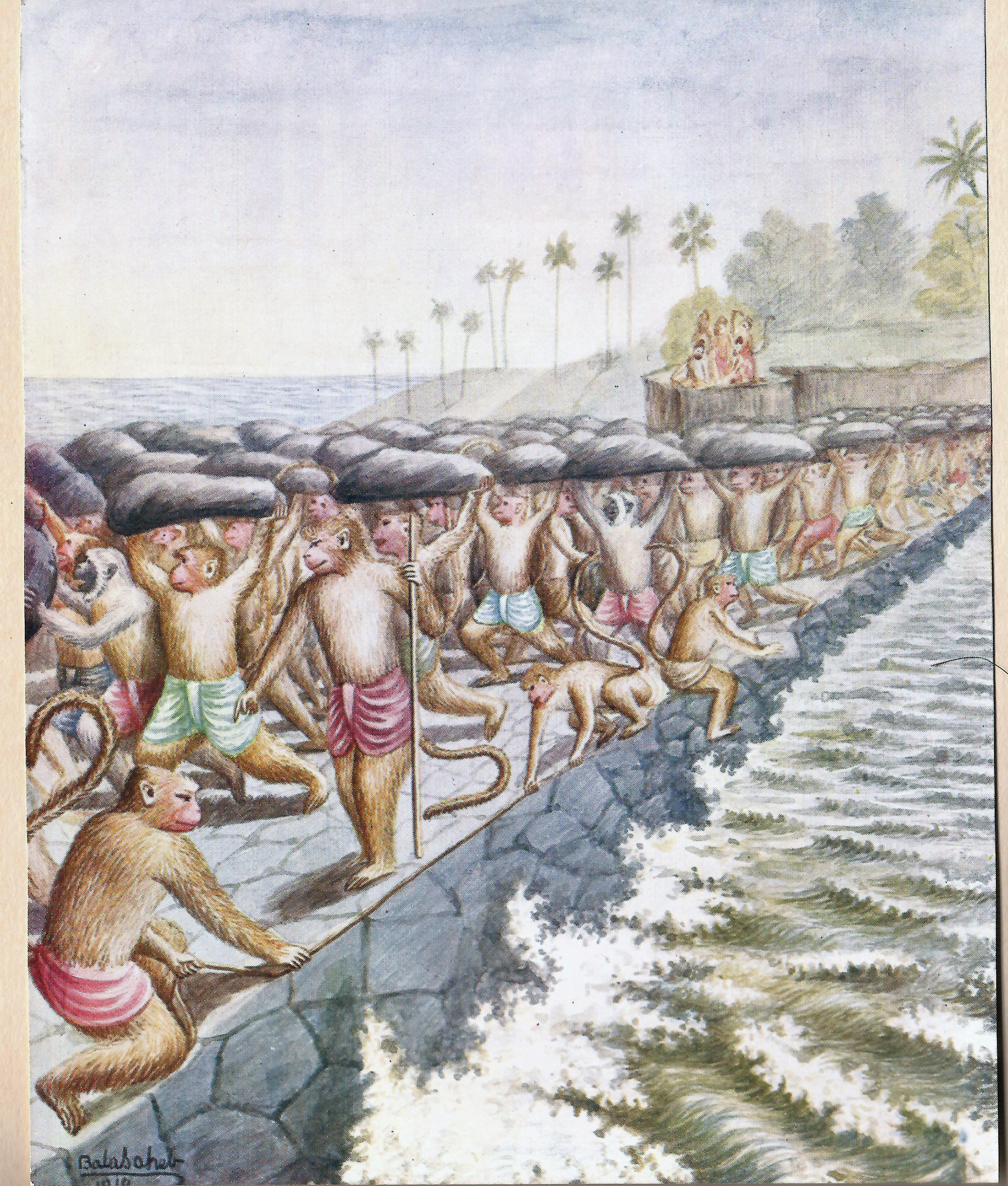
Building Rama Setu Bridge to Lanka.

Jambavan asks the monkeys Nala and Nila to begin work on building the bridge across the sea. The Mānas states that entire mountain ranges were used by Nala and Nila to complete their objective. Rama remembers Lord Shiva and decides to install a shrine for Rameswaram. Upon completion, the army of Rama begins to cross the bridge and arrives at Lanka, taking camp on Mount Suvela. Ravana hears of the advances of Rama's army and feels greatly agitated. Mandodari asks Ravana to return Sita to Rama as she fears for her husband's life. Ravana is dismissive of Rama's power and pacifies his wife. Next, Ravana's son Prahasta attempts to reinforce his mother's sentiments, but all to no avail.

Rama fires a warning shot from his retreat in Suvela. The arrow strikes Ravana's crown and royal umbrella. Mandodari once again attempts to convince Ravana of handing Sita back to Rama. Meanwhile, Rama asks Jambavan what should be done. Jambavan suggests that they send Angada, as messenger, to give Ravana a chance to return Sita. On reaching Ravana's court, Angada explains he is the ambassador of Rama and tells Ravana that he still has time to save himself from destruction. Ravana insults Angada and his refusal to comply makes war inevitable.

The war begins with great ferocity as Ravana loses half of his army on the first day. Indrajit, Ravan's son, is required to enter the battle far earlier than he expected. He severely wounds Lakshman with his special weapon, the Saang. Hanuman is ordered to fetch the doctor of Lanka called Sushena. Sushena tells Rama that there exists a herb called Sanjivani which can only be found in the Himalayan mountains. It is the only hope to save Lakshman. Hanuman immediately reassures Rama that he shall find this herb. As Hanuman is about to leave, Ravana orders the demon Kalanemi to impede him. However, Hanuman kills Kalanemi with ease. Hanuman reaches the mountain and can't find the herb. In his frustration he decides to take the entire mountain to Lanka.

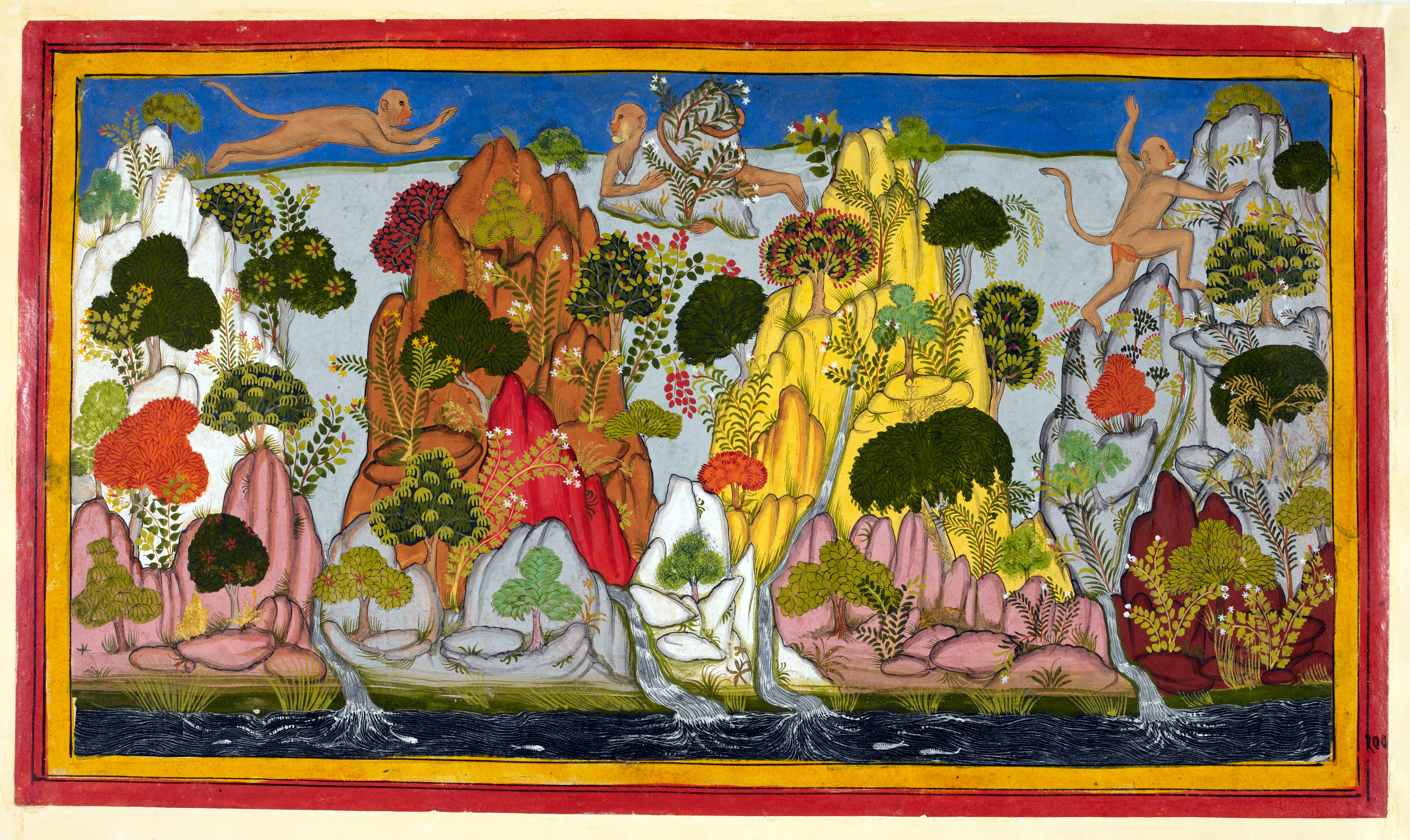
Hanuman searching for the Sanjivani herb. Miniature by Sahibdin from the Mewar Ramayana, 1653. British Library

Hanuman makes good speed towards Lanka when suddenly he is shot by an arrow as he approaches Nandigram. Hanuman is mistaken to be a demon by Bharat. Hanuman falls to the ground together with the great hill. Hanuman regains consciousness and recognises that Bharata is Rama's brother. He continues on to Lanka where he delivers the Sanjivani herb and Sushena treats Lakshman. Rama embraces Hanuman with great pride and affection. Ravan takes the news of Lakshman's recovery very badly and decides to awaken his brother Kumbhakarna.

Kumbhakarna kills indiscriminately and wreaks much havoc. Rama releases an arrow which kills him instantly. The death of his brother scares Ravan greatly. Indrajit hastily tries to arrange a ceremony to receive great boons and powers but is interrupted by Hanuman and Angada. Lakshman takes up arms against Indrajit and kills him. Rama throws numerous arrows at Ravana but is unable to kill him. He asks Vibhishan on how to kill his brother after which Rama finally kills Ravana. The war is over.

Ravana's funeral takes place and Vibhishan is crowned the king of Lanka. Hanuman carries the happy news to Sita in Ashok Vatika. Finally Rama and Sita are reunited. Rama and the army prepare to depart Lanka and return towards Ayodhya. Rama, Sita, Lakshman and the senior monkeys travel back in Ravana's flying vehicle, Pushpak Vimaan.

=== Uttar Kānd ===
The epilogue

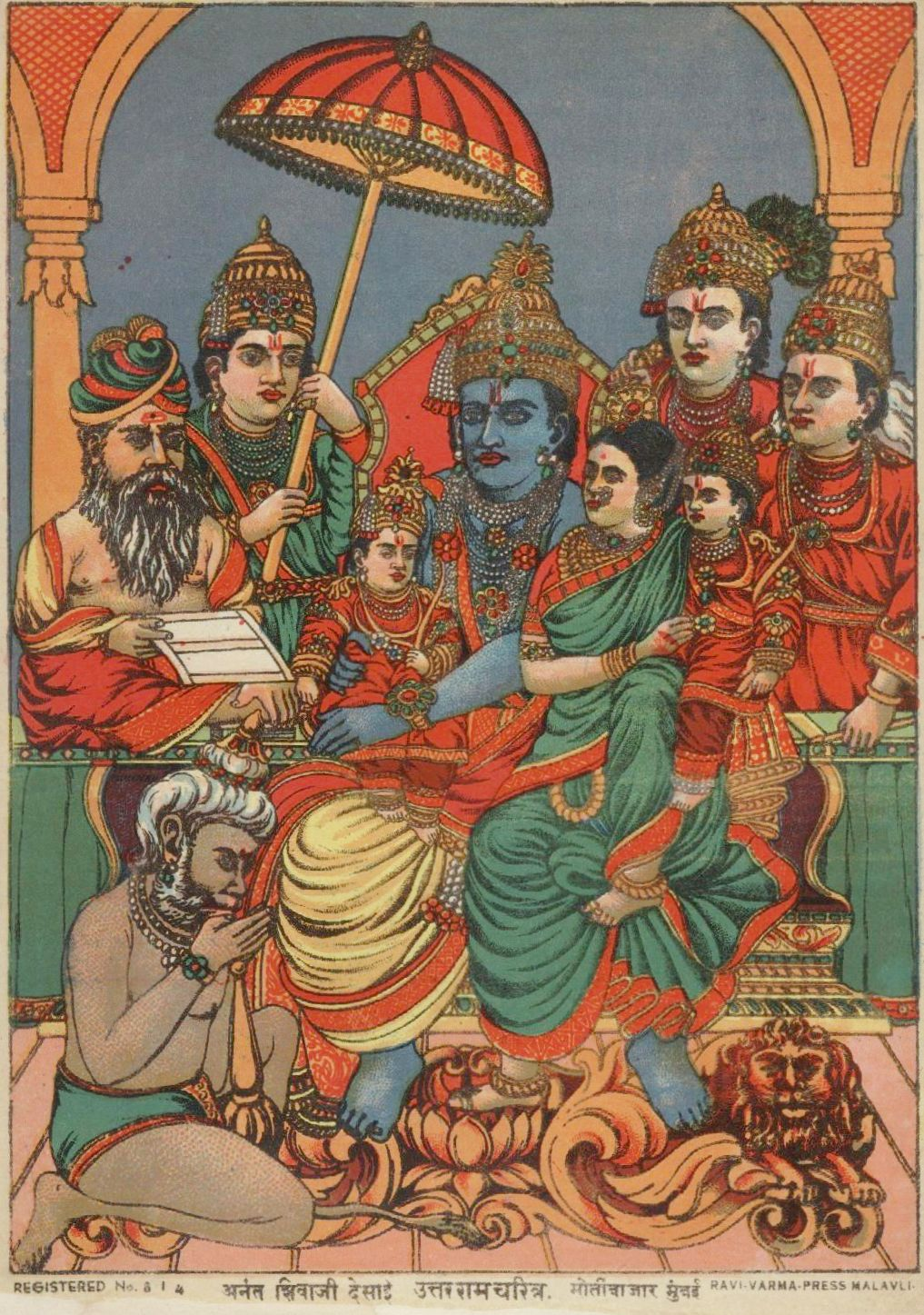
The Family of Rama

It is now the day before Rama is to return to Ayodhya after serving his exile. Bharata is anxious that his brother still hasn't arrived. The Mānas mentions that Bharata had passed his days shedding tears for fourteen years in Nandigram. Hanuman meets Bharata telling him of the arrival of Rama, Sita and Laksman. Bharata rushes to Ayodhya to tell the citizens of the great news. As the Pushpak Vimaan landed in Ayodhya the citizens shouted chants of 'Glory be to Ramchandra'. Rama, Sita and Laksman collectively touch the feet of the sage Vashishta on arriving in Ayodhya and thereafter greet all that have gathered in the assembly. Lastly Rama meets Bharata with great affection and love. Rama's coronation takes place and he is finally crowned king of Ayodhya. Shiva arrives to glorify the festivities further and asks Rama of the boon that he may have firm and undeviating devotion of Rama's feet.

In conclusion to the tale, Rama has twin sons named Lava and Kusha. The other brothers each have two sons as well. It is mentioned that great sages like Nārad and Sanaka visit Ayodhya to meet with Rama and to see his great city.

In the subsequent passages of Uttar Kānd the biography of Saint Kakbhushundi is given, followed by a description of what is to be expected in the current age of Kali Yuga. Shiva ends his narration of the Rama Katha to Parvati as does Kakbhushundi to Garuda. It is not mentioned whether Yajnavalkya finishes his recitation to Bharadwaj. Finally, Goswami Tulsidas concludes his retelling of the Shri Ramcharitmanas. The Rudrastakam in Sanskrit is a part of this Kanda.

== Stories behind the incarnation of Rama ==
During the Bālakāṇḍa, it is mentioned that Shiva is retelling the story of Rama (Rama Katha) to his spouse Parvati. During this retelling, Shiva explains as many as five reasons why Rama incarnated on earth.

=== Jay and Vijay ===
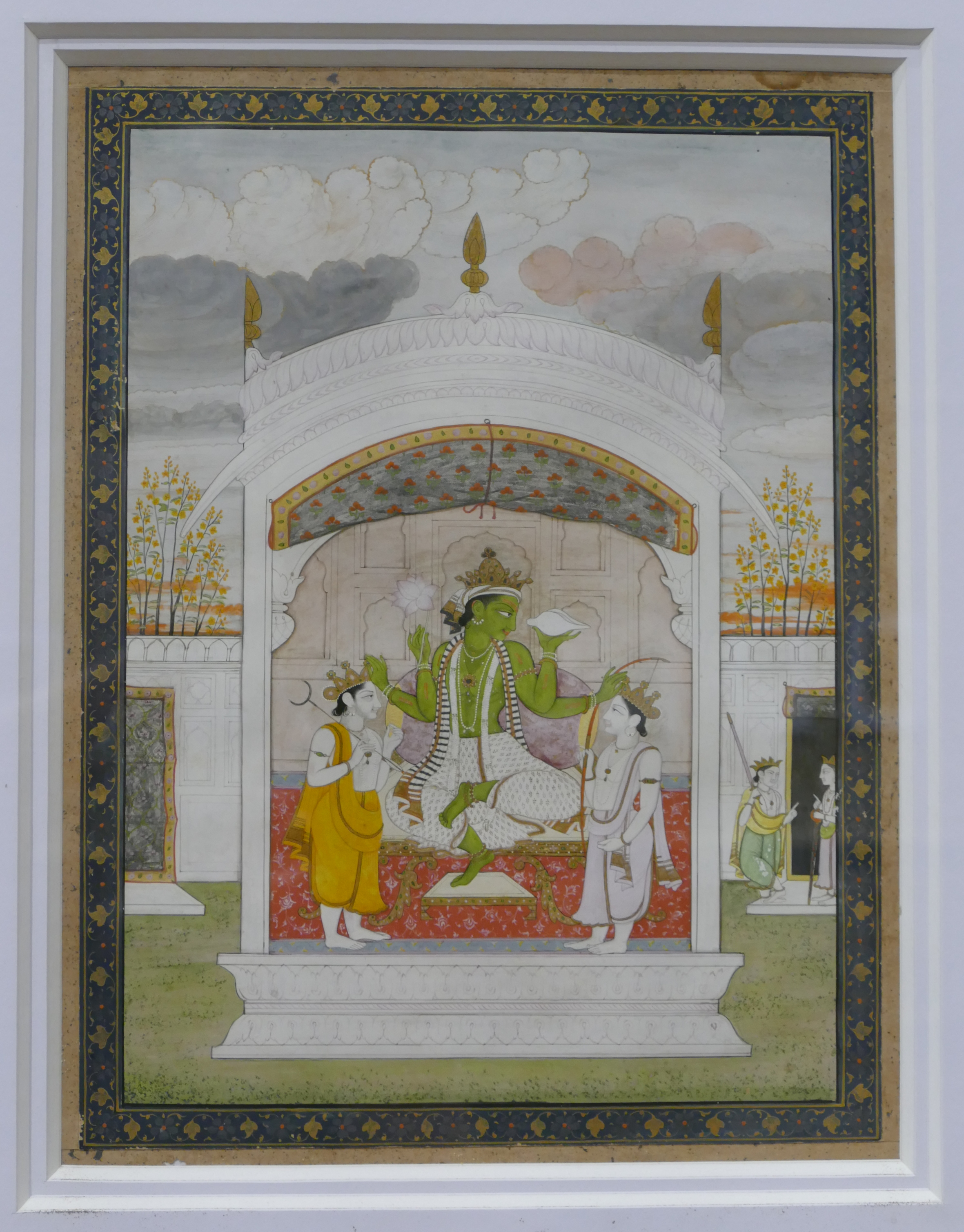
Vishnu with Jay and Vijay

The brothers Jay and Vijay are the two favoured gate keepers of Vishnu. Due to a curse by the four Kumaras, Jay and Vijay were born as demons. One took the birth of Ravana and the other was born as Kumbhakarna. Vishnu then incarnated as Rama to kill Ravana and Kumbhakarna.

=== The Curse of Nārad Muni ===
Nārad Muni was wandering in the Himalayan mountains and begins to think of Vishnu. He instantly falls into a deep meditative trance. Seeing the sage's state, Indra becomes apprehensive as he sees Nārad's trance as a threat to his own position as the chief of demigods in heaven. Indra asks Kamadeva to disturb Nārad's trance. Unable to defeat Narada, Kamadeva falls at Nārad's feet, addressing him with deep humility. Narada recalls all that happened to Shiva and becomes prideful of defeating Kamadeva. Shiva admonishes him not to repeat the story to Vishnu.

Nārad visits Vishnu at his abode and unable to control his pride, re-tells his episode with Kamadeva, ignoring all that Shiva had advised. Vishnu further fans Nārad's pride by telling him that his steadfast vow of celibacy is so strong that he can never be smitten. Nārad then departs Vishnu's abode. Vishnu tells Laksmi that he has a plan and sets his illusory powers (maya) into operation. As Nārad departs Vaikuntha, Vishnu creates a beautiful illusory city with illusionary inhabitants. The city is ruled by King Sheelanidhi, who has a beautiful daughter called Vishvamohini. Nārad is intrigued with the city and decides to visit the king. Nārad sees the king's daughter and falls in love with her. The king explains that he wishes to marry his daughter to a suitable man. Nārad devises a plot to get the princess to choose him.

Nārad approaches Vishnu and asks him for the gift of great beauty. Vishnu says that he will do only that which is beneficial to Nārad. The sage is glad at heart and thinks that with Vishnu's favor, the princess will surely choose him. Narad desired the appearance of Vishnu. He asked Lord to give him "Hari mukh", which translates into "face of Hari." The word "Hari" also refers to "monkey." Vishnu granted his wish by giving him face of a monkey. The entire royal court is aware of Nārad's appearance, but says nothing. The princess filled with rage as soon as she sees Nārad's ugly form and completely ignores him. When Narad sees his reflection in water he curses Vishnu, "You made me look like a monkey; therefore You shall have monkeys for Your mates. And as You have grievously wronged me, so shall You suffer the pangs of separation from Your wife." Vishnu accepts Nārad's curse and instantly withdraws his illusionary spell.

Nārad realises that there is no city and there is no Visvamohini, and is dismayed at what he has done. He begs Vishnu to invalidate his curse. Vishnu explains that it was His will and advises Nārad to chant Lord Shiva's name to absolve himself of any sin. Nārad returns to his abode chanting the praises of Ram.

=== Svayambhuva Manu and Shatarupa ===
Svayambhuva Manu had a wife named Shatarupa. After ruling the earth for many years, he decides pass the throne to his son and retires to the forest with Shatarupa and meditate upon the Lord.

Manu and Shatarupa first sacrifice food and then water and are finally willing to sacrifice air. Brahma, Hari and Shiva call on Manu but Manu and Satarupa are resolute and do not swerve on their sacrifices. A great voice from the heavens tells Manu, in sweet tones, to ask for a boon. Rama and Sita approach Manu in a beautiful form, which leaves Manu overcome with emotion. Manu explains now that he and Satarupa have seen the Lord's lotus feet, all their desires have been met. Manu has one longing but doesn't know how to ask the Lord. Finally he asks, "O gracious Lord, I tell You my sincere wish: I would have a son like You. I have nothing to conceal from You."

The Lord announces that it shall be, however, where would he find a son like Himself? The Lord tells Manu that He Himself would be a son to him. The Lord then asks Satarupa of her wish. She says that she greatly likes the boon received by her husband and wants the same. Bowing at the Lord's feet, Manu then asks one more favour. He asks that he be dependent on which is granted. The Lord then commands the couple to dwell in Indra's capital in heaven.

The Lord explains that after some time Manu would be born as the king of Ayodhya, Dasharatha and Satarupa as Kausalya. He would then manifest Himself in the royal household as their son. He reassured the couple that their desire would be accomplished.

=== Tale of King Pratapbhanu ===
Prior to the birth of Rama, Muni Bharadwaja is told the story of King Pratapbhanu by Yajnavalkya.

Once Pratapbhanu goes into the forest to hunt and sees a wild boar. The boar is actually the demon Kalaketu in disguise who runs away from the king. Pratapbhanu gives chase deeper into the forest. Pratapbhanu chases for many miles and becomes thirsty. He approaches a fake saint's ashram, where the resident fake saint wants to hurt and insult Pratapbhanu due to a previous incident. Pratapbhanu doesn't recognize the saint, who begins to sweet talk the king and says that by pure love, he wishes to impart boons onto the king. The king asks to be invincible and never ageing, which the fake saint grants, but with the condition that he needs to win favor of all Brahmans. The fake saint advises that the king arrange the cooking of holy food (prasadam) to feed the bramanas, who would surely be in his favor for such an act of kindness. The fake saint's real intention is to trap the king and repay him for his old grievances.

The fake saint asks the king to go rest, and that he would arrange the feast for the bramanas using his mystic powers. Pratapbhanu waits for three days for the fake saint. Kalaketu, now disguised as a priest, approaches the King in his court and says that he has been sent to cook the holy food. The entire brahmana community is invited. A heavenly voice from above warns the brahmanas that the food is impure and they should run away immediately. They curse the king that he, his kingdom and entire family are wiped from the face of earth. They also curse that he be born a demon in his next life. The heavenly voice says that the brahmana's curse is ill thought, as Pratapbhanu is not to blame. Since their curse cannot be taken back, the voice says that it is the Brahmana community that will bear the brunt of the evil of his next life.

Pratapbhanu is distraught and quickly goes to his kitchen to find Kalaketu. The king is pained and cries as he realizes Kalaketu has vanished. The brahmanas feel sorry for Pratapbhanu and tell him that his evil next life will be ended by Supreme Vishnu himself. As per the curse, Pratapbhanu, Arimardam and Dharmaruchi are all killed as other neighboring kings invade Kaikay.

Pratapbhanu is reborn as Ravan, Arimardam is reborn as Kumbhkarna and Dharmaruchi as Vibhishan. All three take great penances and are approached by Brahma and Shiva and are asked for any boon. Ravan asks that no one should be able to kill me except the tribes of man and monkeys. Kumbhkarna asks for uninterrupted sleep for periods of six months. Vibhishan asks for unshakable love for the feet of Vishnu.

== The immolation of Sati and the incarnation of Parvati ==
The story of how Shiva came about retelling Ramkatha to his consort Parvati is retold in great detail within the Bālakāṇḍa. This part of the story is narrated by Sant Yajnavalkya to Bharadvaj Muni.

=== Sati's doubts ===
In the age of Treta, Shiva, accompanied by his consort Bhavani Sati, went to visit Rishi Agastya. The Rishi being pleased with Shiva's visit, began to narrate the eternal story of Ram. Shiva listens with great pleasure and then they return towards Their abode. Around these exact days Ram had descended on earth and was wandering the Dandaka forest with Sita and Lakshman. Shiva ponders how he can catch sight of Ram. He finally sees Ram, who is frantically searching for Sita and instantly joins his palms and prays "Glory to the Redeemer of the universe, who is Truth, Consciousness and Bliss". Sati cannot recognize Ram and wonders why her Supreme Shiva is praising a mortal. Shiva is the knower of all truth and instantly reads Sati's thoughts. He advises her to not harbor such doubts and accept that she had seen Ram, whom Agastya had praised earlier. He finally says that if she is still not convinced then she should seek to verify this truth herself. Shiva observes as Sati takes the guise of Sita. Ram and Lakshman instantly see through Sati's disguised and asks about Shiva's whereabouts. Sati feels very uncomfortable and heads towards Shiva, thinking of how she is going to explain her folly of questioning his word.

Shiva asks her to tell the truth of how she tested Ram. Sati is unable to tell the truth and says that she did not test Ram, but praised his as You had. Sati forgets that Shiva knows all that has happened and is disappointed that she was disguised as his Sita. He decides that Sati is too chaste to abandon and it is a sin to continue to be her Husband and so from then he has no connection with Sati in her current body. Sati concludes that Shiva has come to know everything and feels foolish for having tried to deceive Him. Shiva sits under a banyan tree and enters into a long trance. Sati feels sorry but accepts that providence is repaying her for her sins. Many years pass and Shiva finally ends his trance whilst praising Ram. Sati bows down at Shiva's feet, after which he seats Sati opposite him and he begins to tell stories of Vishnu's exploits.

=== Daksha's sacrifice ===
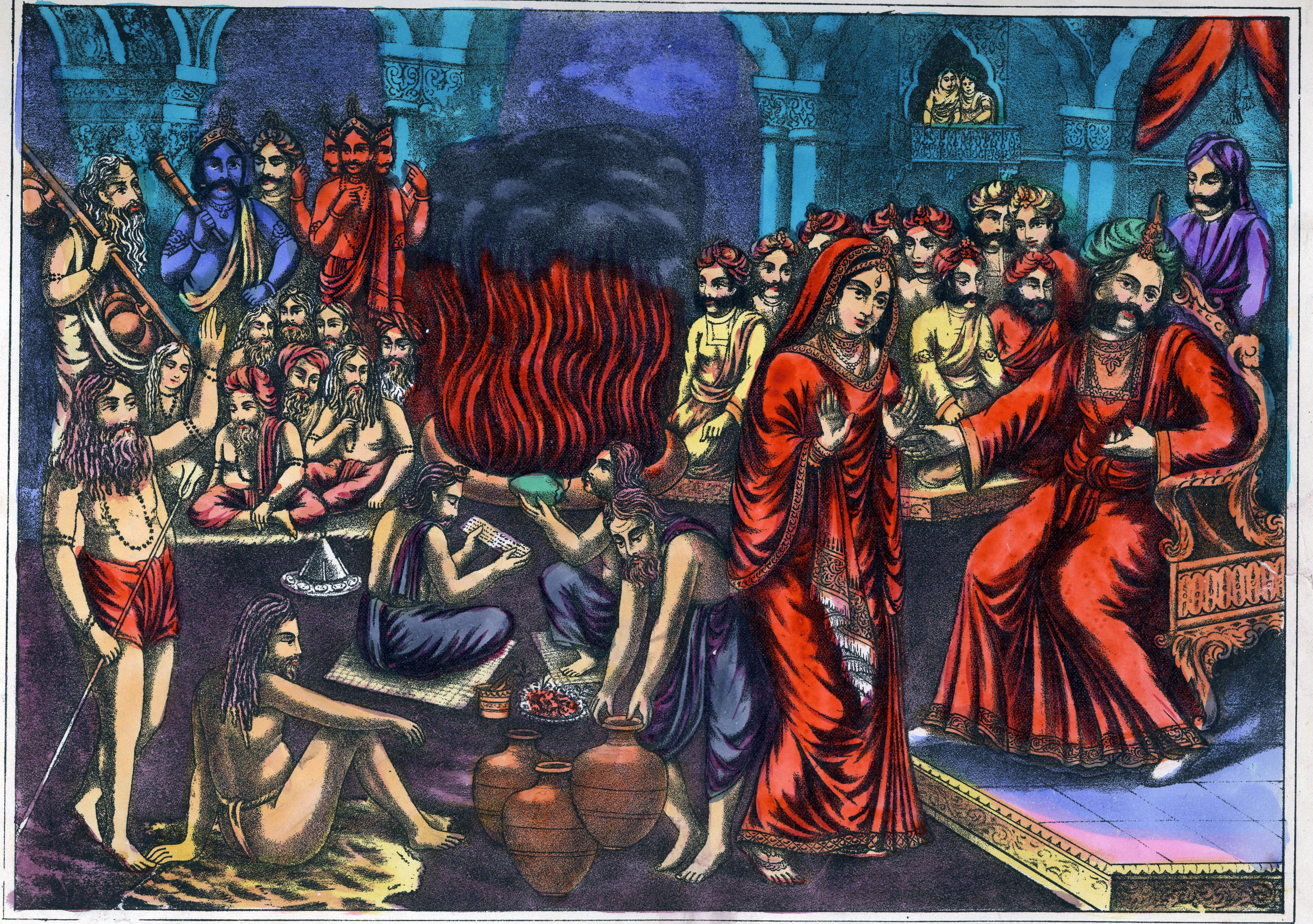
Daksha insults Sati in his sacrifice

While Shiva is narrating the stories of Vishnu, the air is filled with celestial beings. Sati asks Shiva what the occasion is. Shiva explains that her father Daksha has organised a great sacrifice where many demigods were invited. All except Brahma, Vishnu and Shiva were invited as Daksha had developed a hatred towards the Gods. Sati thinks of her father and asks if She may visit him at this time. Shiva says that they have no formal invite and that all of Sati's sisters are invited but because of his animosity towards Shiva, Her father has not invited us. Shiva tries to reason with Sati, that no good can come of her attending, but Tulsidas explains that a daughters ties to her father are very strong.

When she reaches her father's abode, no one welcomes her apart from her mother. Daksha does not even acknowledge her and actually burns with anger that she has turned up uninvited. Sati looks around and sees no oblations set apart for Shiva and the lack of respect of her father causes her mind to rage with great anger. She faces her father's court and announces that Shiva is the father of the universe and the beneficent of all. It is the same Shiva that her father vilifies. She burns her body with the fires of Yoga. Her guards are beaten and thrashed. When Shiva discovers this, he sends Virabhadra, who wreaks havoc of the sacrifice and Daksha is slain. As Sati is about to die, she asks Lord Hari of the boon that she be devoted to Shiva's feet in successive births. She is reborn as Parvati, the daughter of Himavan and Mainavati.

=== Parvati and Nārad's prophecy ===
Years after the birth of Parvati, Nārad Muni visits her parents Himavan and Maina. Himavan asks Nārad what the future holds for his daughter. Nārad says that Parvati will be adorned with good traits and win unfailing love of her husband. She will remain ever united with him and bring great glory upon her parents. The only drawback is that her husband will be an ascetic with matted hair who is naked and of hideous accouterments. Himavan and Maina become disconsolate while Parvati is greatly pleased, as she senses from Nārad's words that her boon from Vishnu is coming true. Nārad explains to Himachal that the only person who shows the virtues as described by him is Shiva. Parvati's parents are immediately uplifted and as Nārad leaves, he asks Parvati to fix Her thoughts on Hari and practice austerity. The young Parvati enters the forest and performs great penances in order to obtain Shiva. Her body thins greatly due to her self-mortification after which Brahma declares that she should cease her severe penances as Shiva would soon be hers. History had produced many great sages, but none had performed such penances as this. Brahma instructs that her father would soon come for her and that she should return home with him.

Ever since Sati had quit her body, Shiva had begun chanting Ram's name and entered into a great trance. Through his mystic power, Ram asks Shiva to marry Parvati. Shiva says that this is not a justifiable request but the word of a master cannot be set aside and must be obeyed. Shiva remains in his great trance. Around that time the demon Tāraka was causing distress and was in full flourish. Brahma declares that the son of Shiva will kill Tāraka, but for this to happen His wedding with Parvati needs to be arranged and for that to happen, Shiva's trance has to be broken. It is decided that the God of Love should be sent to awaken Shiva. He fires five arrows of flowers at Shiva's breast, the trance is broken and Shiva awakens. Shiva is enraged and, through his third eye, reduces Love to ashes. Love's consort Rati faints as soon as she hears of her husband's demise. Seeing the helpless woman, Shiva foretells that her husband will now be called bodiless and shall dominate all without a body form. When Krishna descends on earth, her husband would be born as his son Pradyumna. Thereafter Brahma and other gods approach Shiva and declare that they wish to witness His wedding with their own eyes. Remembering Vishnu's early request, Shiva gladly agrees and Brahma proceeds to arrange the marriage.

=== The wedding of Shiva and Parvati ===
Shiva has no real family and so his attendants begin to adorn him for his wedding to Parvati. His hair is formed into a crown with serpents forming a crest. Serpents form His earrings, bracelets and adorn his neck and He is smeared in ashes and has lion's skin wrapped around His loins. He heads the wedding procession and Vishnu and Brahma, as well as a host of spirits, Gandharavs and Danavs follow behind. After the wedding, Parvati and Shiva return to Kailash where Parvati asks questions around Rama's divinity. Here Shiva begins his narration of Ram Leela.

== The divinity of Ram in the Manas ==
=== Ram's divine birth ===
On the ninth day of the Chaitra month, the Manas describes that the Sun is at its meridian and the climate is neither cold nor hot. There is a cool, soft and fragrant breeze. The woods are full of blossom and the rivers are in full flow. Brahma deduces that the time for Ram's birth is approaching and the heavenly beings all crowd over the skies to glimpse sight of the auspicious moment. The sky resounds of music and songs as the heavenly beings offer their praises to the Supreme Personality of Godhead.

Here begins one of the most famous chhands from the Manas, the Ram Janam Stuti. The stuti begins with the appearance of Ram. Mother Kaushalya's heart is filled with joy as she marvels over Ram's dark complexion and his four armed form. He is adorned with jewels and a garland of Sylvan flowers and is described as being an ocean of beauty. Kaushalya joins her palms and prays. "O Infinite, How can I praise You! The Vedas and Puranas reveal you to be the repository of all virtues. You are the Lord of Lakshmi and the lover of all of Your devotees and have appeared for my good. Every pore of Your body contains multitudes of universes and the thought that You stayed in my womb is truly staggering." Ram smiles and exhorts Kaushalya by telling her the charming account of her previous birth so that she can accept Him as her own child. Kaushalya asks Ram to give up his current superhuman form and to start to indulge in childish sports that are dear to a mother's heart. Ram, described as the Lord of immortals, immediately becomes an infant and begins to cry.

Tulsidas concludes that whoever sings this Stuti attains the abode of Lord Vishnu and never falls into the well of mundane existence. The Stuti has therefore been immortalized and it is a popular prayer sung on the occasion of Ram's birthday.

=== Deliverance of Ahalya ===
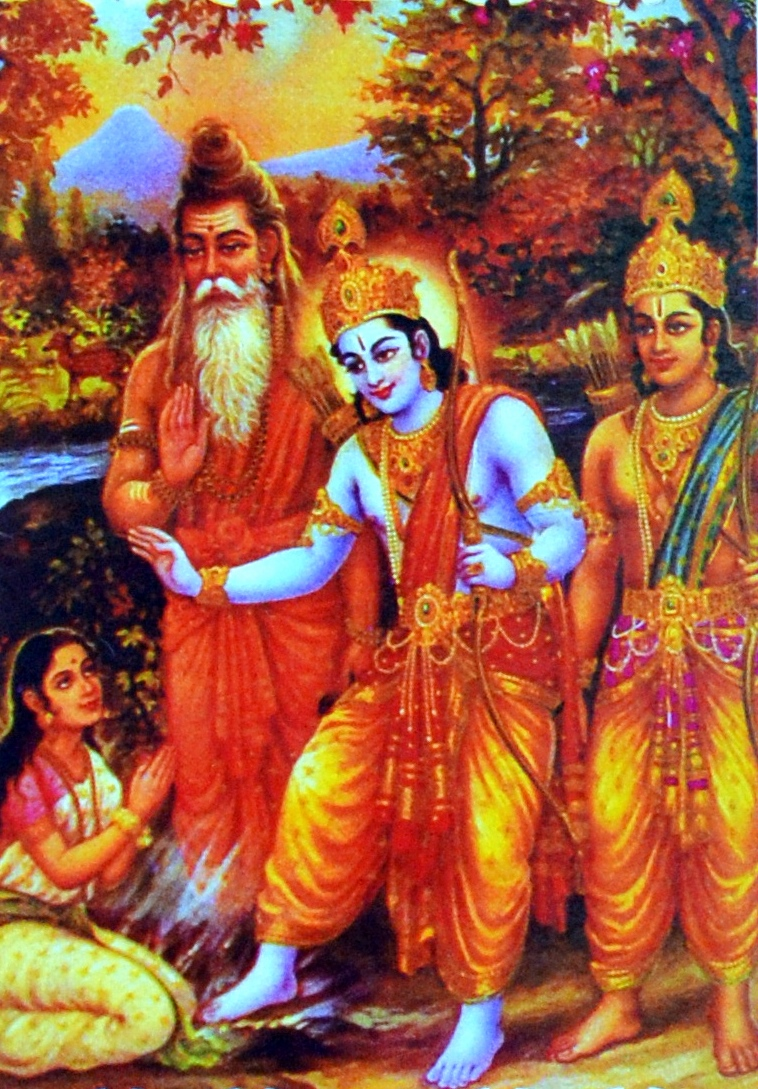
Rama touches the stone by his foot, which turns to Ahalya

Ahalya, the wife of Rishi Gautam, was a beautiful woman. Indra, king of the gods, was tempted and decided to seduce her with trickery. Early morning Rishi Gautam when the dawn had arrived go down to the nearby Ganges for his usual morning bath. While the Rishi was bathing at the river, Indra assumed Gautam's form and visited Ahalya, fooling her into thinking he was her husband. When Gautam returned, he encountered Indra, emerging from his hut in his (Gautam's) form. Spiritually powerful, Gautam employed his divine vision to see the whole episode. Enraged, he cursed Indra with impotence. Losing his potency, Indra lost heaven to demons and sat prayerfully in a lotus flower for thousands of years in order to repent. Rishi Gautam, in a blind rage, also cursed his wife, Ahalya, to turn into a boulder. Innocent of any intentional wrongdoing, Ahalya begged for forgiveness. Gautam relented somewhat and said that when Ram is incarnated, he will bless her and break her curse.

Ram, while going to Mithila for Sita Svayamvar along with Sage Vishwamitra and Laksman, stopped at the, then-uninhabited, hermitage of Rishi Gautam. Vishwamitra narrated Ahalya's story to Ram, and asked him to free her. Ram touched the boulder with his foot and Ahalya was immediately released from the curse. She fell to Ram's feet and washed his feet with her tears. She felt that her curse had become her fortune as she got the opportunity to seek Ram's refuge in person. She then returned to her husband's place.

== The abrupt ending ==
Many scholars have commented on the sudden ending to the Manas. Valmiki's Uttar Kānd goes into great detail about Sita going into the forest, as a result of disapproving gossip of the citizens of Ayodhya, during the rule of Ram over Ayodhya. Sita asks Mother Earth to receive her, while Ram leaves his human form and returns to his celestial abode. Tulsidas decides not to mention these at all. The Katha Kar Morari Bapu has mentioned in many of his retellings of Ram Katha, that Tulsidas didn't want to end the Manas in heartache for Sita. There are some Vaishnav devotees who only recite the Bālakāṇḍa of the Manas, as this is seen as the happiest period of Ram and Sita's leela on earth.

== Recitation ==
Two formalised modes of sequential recitation (pārāyaṇ) of the epic are widely practised: the nine-day navāh pārāyaṇ and the thirty-day mās pārāyaṇ; a third form, akhaṇḍ pāṭh ("unbroken reading"), is the recitation of the entire text within twenty-four hours. Most printed editions mark the stopping points for the nine- and thirty-day readings and give instructions for the accompanying rituals; the divisions now in common use are those of the Gita Press editions, whose nine-day scheme allots 119 or 120 stanzas to each day. These systems appear to derive from the Puranic tradition of seven- and nine-day recitation, but some scholars question whether either much predates the nineteenth century, since instructions for systematic recitation are absent from pre-1800 manuscripts.

== Translations ==
=== English ===
Frederic Growse translated the Ramcharitmanas into English under the title The Ramayan of Tulsidas during the nineteenth century.

=== Malayalam ===
C. G. Rajagopal translated Ramcharitmanas into Malayalam as Tulasidasasa Ramayanam. For this translation, he received the Sahitya Akademi Translation Prize 2019, presented by Sahitya Akademi, India's National Academy of Letters.

== Adaptations ==
The television serial Ramayan, produced and directed by Ramanand Sagar, premiered on Doordarshan on 25 January 1987 and took the Ramcharitmanas as the major source for its screenplay; according to Philip Lutgendorf it closely followed Tulsidas's version of the story. Lutgendorf notes continuities between the serial and older genres of Manas performance, including its serialised format, the presence of a storyteller-commentator, and its alternation of spoken dialogue with sung narration consisting largely of Manas verses set to music.

== See also ==
- Tulsi Manas Mandir
- Vaishnava Matabja Bhaskara
- Sri Ramarchan Paddati
- Valmiki Samhita
- Maithili Maha Upanishad
- Ramnami Samaj

== Notes and references ==
Notes

Online sources

- "1318_Sri Ramchritmanas_Roman" (PDF). Gorakhpur, India: Gita Press. Archived from the original (PDF) on 22 September 2013.

Bibliography

- Ascher, William; Heffron, John M. (15 November 2010). Cultural Change and Persistence: New Perspectives on Development. Palgrave Macmillan. ISBN 978-0-230-11733-4.
- Agarwal, Mirgandra (1 January 2005). Philosophy of Inspiration. Sterling Publishers Pvt. Ltd. ISBN 978-1-84557-280-8.
- Bakker, Freek L. (2009). The Challenge of the Silver Screen: An Analysis of the Cinematic Portraits of Jesus, Rama, Buddha and Muhammad. BRILL. ISBN 978-90-04-16861-9.
- Bulcke, Camille; Prasāda, Dineśvara (2010). Rāmakathā and Other Essays. Vani Prakashan. ISBN 978-93-5000-107-3.
- Callewaert, Winand M. (1 January 2000). Banaras: Vision of a Living Ancient Tradition. Hemkunt Press. ISBN 978-81-7010-302-8.
- Coogan, Michael D. (2003). The Illustrated Guide to World Religions. Oxford University Press. ISBN 978-0-19-521997-5.
- Duiker, William J. (2 March 2012). Cengage Advantage Books: World History, Complete, 7th ed. Cengage Learning. ISBN 978-1-133-71009-7.
- Ghosh, Amitav (2002). The Imam and the Indian: Prose Pieces. Orient Blackswan. ISBN 978-81-7530-047-7.
- Gupta, Kulwant Rai; Gupta, Amita (1 January 2006). Concise Encyclopaedia Of India. Atlantic Publishers & Dist. ISBN 978-81-269-0637-6.
- Jones, Constance; Ryan, James D. (2006). Encyclopedia of Hinduism. Infobase Publishing. ISBN 978-0-8160-7564-5.
- Kirpal Singh, Annie Mathew (2012). Frank Middle School Social Sciences Class VII. Frank Brothers. ISBN 978-81-8409-102-1.
- Kumar, A. (1 January 2001). Social Transformation In Modern India. Sarup & Sons. ISBN 978-81-7625-227-0.
- Lamb, Ramdas (29 August 2002). Rapt in the Name: The Ramnamis, Ramnam, and Untouchable Religion in Central India. SUNY Press. ISBN 978-0-7914-5385-8.
- Lele, Jayant (1981). Tradition and Modernity in Bhakti Movements. Brill Archive. ISBN 978-90-04-06370-9.
- Lochtefeld, James G. (2002). The Illustrated Encyclopedia of Hinduism: N-Z. The Rosen Publishing Group. ISBN 978-0-8239-3180-4.
- Lorenzen, David N. (1995). Bhakti Religion in North India: Community Identity and Political Action. SUNY Press. ISBN 978-0-7914-2025-6.
- Lutgendorf, Philip (1991). The Life of a Text: Performing the Rāmcaritmānas of Tulsidas. Berkeley: University of California Press. ISBN 978-0-520-06690-8.
- Lutgendorf, Philip (13 December 2006). Hanuman's Tale: The Messages of a Divine Monkey. Oxford University Press. ISBN 978-0-19-988582-4.
- MacFie, J. M. (1 May 2004). The Ramayan Of Tulsidas Or The Bible Of Northern India. Kessinger Publishing. ISBN 978-1-4179-1498-2.
- Mathur, Suresh Narain; Chaturvedi, B. K. (2005). The Diamond Book of Hindu Gods and Goddesses. Diamond Pocket Books (P) Ltd. ISBN 978-81-288-0802-9.
- McLean, Malcolm (1998). Devoted to the Goddess: The Life and Work of Ramprasad. SUNY Press. ISBN 978-0-7914-3689-9.
- Mehta, Jarava Lal (January 1992). J.L. Mehta on Heidegger, Hermeneutics, and Indian Tradition. BRILL. ISBN 978-90-04-09488-8.
- Melton, J. Gordon (13 September 2011). Religious Celebrations: An Encyclopedia of Holidays, Festivals, Solemn Observances, and Spiritual Commemorations. ABC-CLIO. ISBN 978-1-59884-205-0.
- Miller, Kevin Christopher (2008). A Community of Sentiment: Indo-Fijian Music and Identity Discourse in Fiji and Its Diaspora. ISBN 978-0-549-72404-9.
- Pillai, Poornima; Bharti, Jyotsna (2005). Gateway to Indian Classical Literature. Asiapac Books Pte Ltd. ISBN 978-981-229-427-2.
- Pinch, William R. (17 March 2006). Warrior Ascetics and Indian Empires. Cambridge University Press. ISBN 978-0-521-85168-8.
- Puri, B.N.; Das, M.N. (1 December 2003). A Comprehensive History of India: Comprehensive history of medieval India. Sterling Publishers Pvt. Ltd. ISBN 978-81-207-2508-9.
- Quinn, Edward (1 January 2009). Critical Companion to George Orwell. Infobase Publishing. ISBN 978-1-4381-0873-5.
- Rajagopal, Arvind (25 January 2001). Politics After Television: Hindu Nationalism and the Reshaping of the Public in India. Cambridge University Press. ISBN 978-0-521-64839-4.
- Richman, Paula (1 January 2001). Questioning Ramayanas: A South Asian Tradition. University of California Press. ISBN 978-0-520-22074-4.
- Sadarangani, Neeti M. (2004). Bhakti Poetry in Medieval India: Its Inception, Cultural Encounter and Impact. Sarup & Sons. ISBN 978-81-7625-436-6.
- Saraswati, Prakashanand (1 January 2001). The True History and the Religion of India: A Concise Encyclopedia of Authentic Hinduism. Motilal Banarsidass. ISBN 978-81-208-1789-0.
- Singh, Khushwant (1 January 1990). India An Introduction. HarperCollins Publishers. ISBN 978-93-5029-243-3.
- Tulasīdāsa; Subramanian, V. K. (2008). Hymns of Tulsidas. Abhinav Publications. ISBN 978-81-7017-496-7.
