= Ramnami Samaj =

Hindu sect

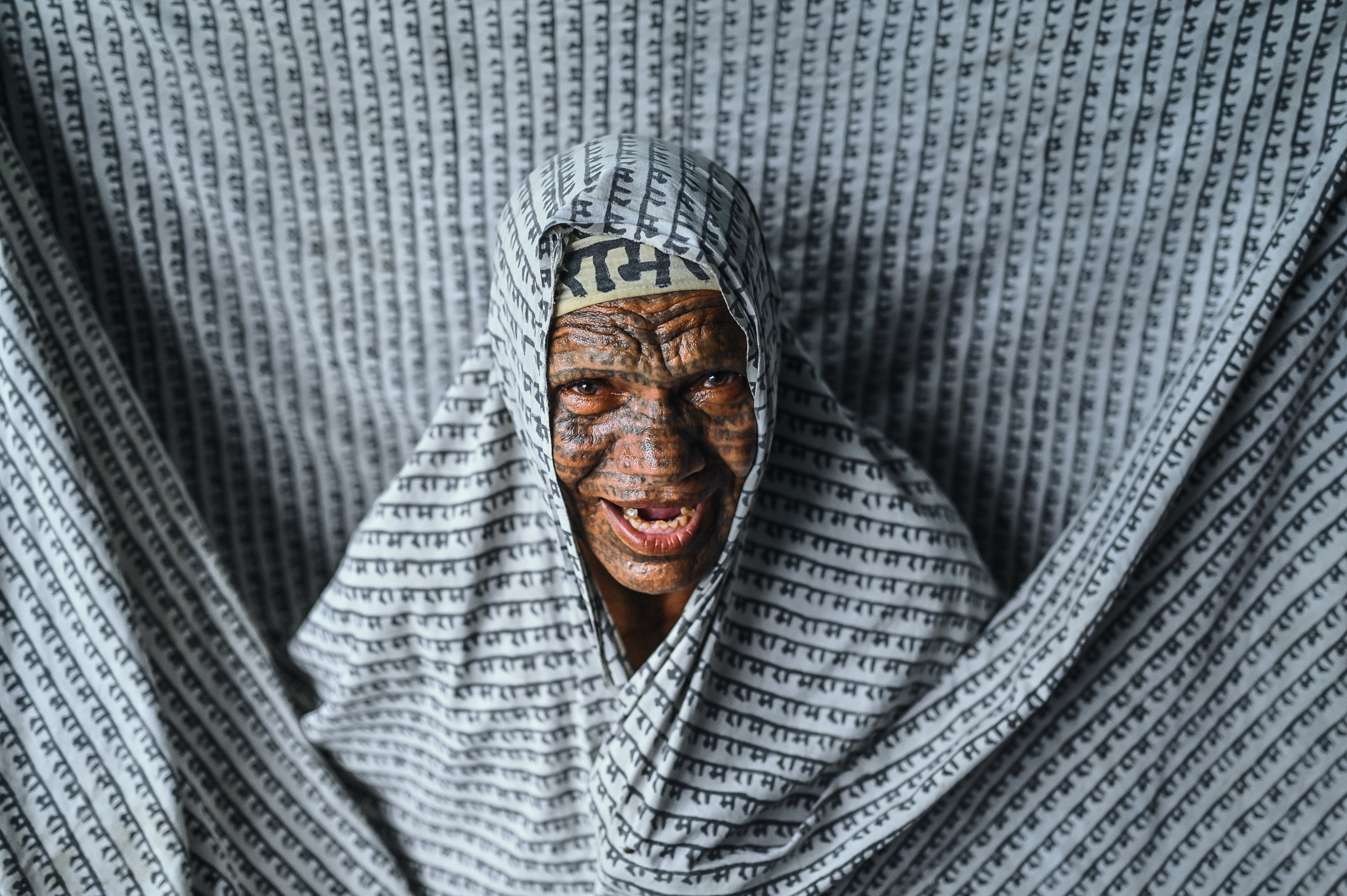
A member of the Ramnami sect in 2022, with tattoos and shawl

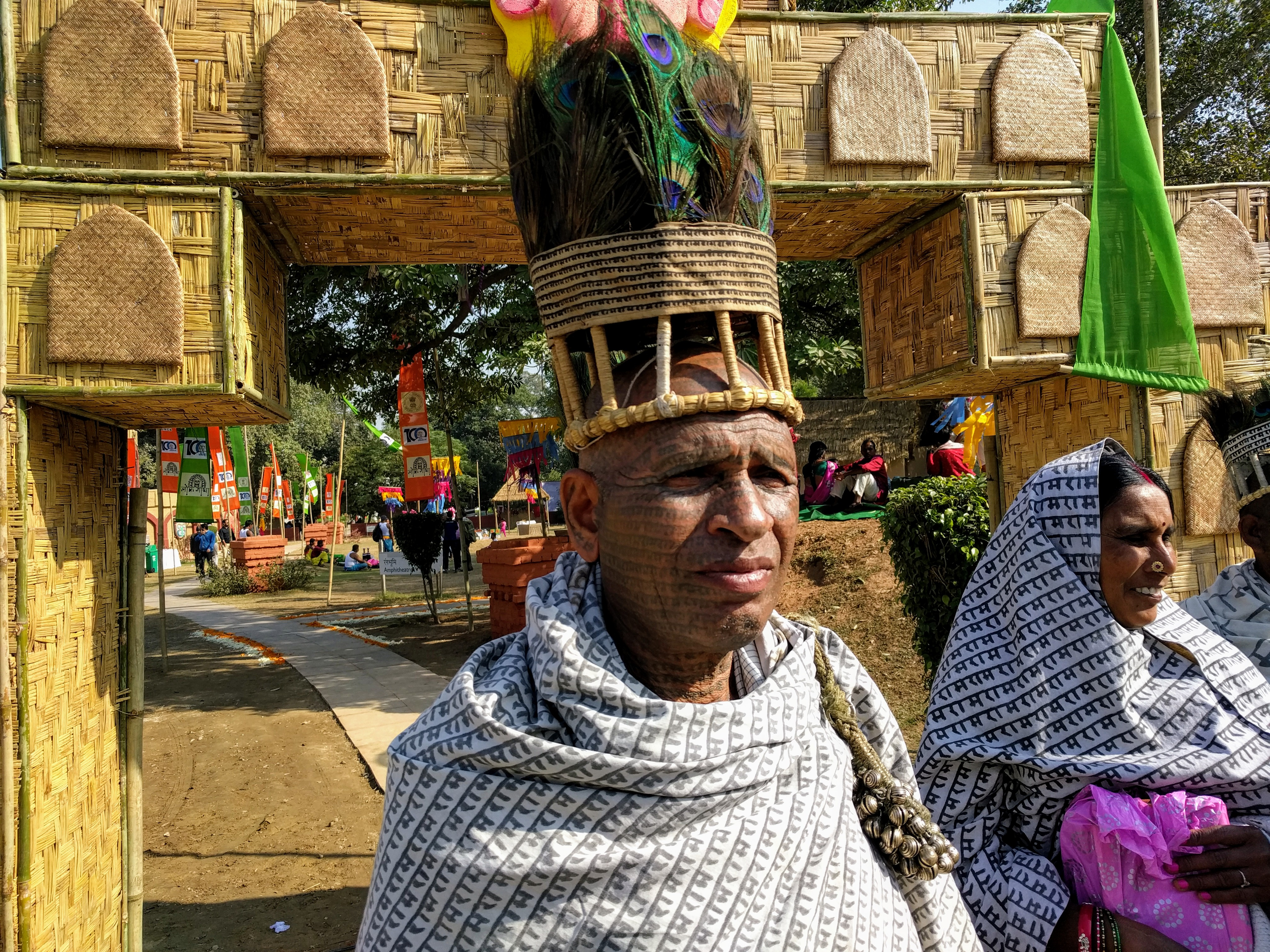
A Ramnami couple

The Rāmnāmī Samāj (lit. 'Community of Ram the Renowned') is a Hindu sect founded by Sant Parasurām, in the 1890s, that worships Rama, a major deity in Hinduism. Living mainly in Chhattisgarh, its adherents tattoo the word "Ram" (Sanskrit: राम) on their bodies and wear shawls with the word "Ram" printed on it and headgear made of peacock feathers. Estimates of the group's population range from about 20,000 to more than 100,000.

== History ==
Sant Parasuram, the Chamar founder of Ramnami samaj born in the 1870s at Charpora village according to anecdotal accounts, is believed to be the first person to tattoo the word "Ram" on his forehead in the 1890s and is considered to be the sect's founder. Parasuram tattooed himself as an act of defiance after being denied entry to a temple because of his caste. According to Ramdas Lamb, the sect is a continuation of the 15th-century Bhakti movement.

In 1910, the Ramnamis won a court case against upper caste Hindus over the right to use the name of the god Ram. As late as the 1980s, tattooed followers were denied entrance to temples because their tattoos "gave away their caste."

== Practices ==
The sect's adherents do not drink or smoke, chant the name of Ram every day, tattoo the word "Ram" on their body, and wear a shawl with the word "Ram" printed on it and a headgear made of peacock feathers. Those with full body tattoos are known as "purnanakshik" and are mostly in their seventies; the younger generations of Ramnamis are no longer tattooed, fearing that they might be discriminated against and denied work because of the tattoos. Ramnamis gather every year for a three-day Bhajan Mela at the end of the harvest season in December–January in the village of Sarsiwa in Raipur district where they erect a jayostambh (a white pillar with the name of Ram inscribed on it) and chant from the Ramcharitmanas.

== Demographics ==
Since Ramnamis are listed simply as Hindus in official records, accurate demographic data is unavailable but elders estimate their population to be no more than 20,000 based on the attendance at the annual Bhajan Mela; however, others estimate it to be more than 100,000. Ramnamis live primarily in villages along the Mahanadi river in Chhattisgarh, but some adherents also live in border regions of Maharashtra and Odisha.
