= Ganesha Chalisa =

Hindu hymn dedicated to Ganesha

The Ganesha Chalisa (Awadhi: गणेश चालीसा, romanized: Gaṇeśa Chālisā, lit. 'forty quatrains on Ganesha') is a Hindu devotional hymn (stotra) addressed to the deity Ganesha. It consists of forty chaupais (quatrain verses in Indian poetry). It is written in the Awadhi language. The Ganesha Chalisa's author is Ram Sunder Prabhu Das, which is mentioned in hymn, but Tulsidas, a well-known poet, and saint who lived in the 16th century CE, is also commonly thought to have written it.

Each of the forty verses of the Ganesha Chalisa conveys one particular form of blessing and, depending on the bhava or shraddha (faith and devotion) of the devotee, how the fruits of the particular verse are attained.

== See also ==
- Ganesh Chaturthi
