= Vivien Challis =

Australian mathematician

Vivien Joy Challis is an Australian applied mathematician whose research involves topology optimisation through the level-set method and its application to bone implants, piezoelectric metamaterials, and robotics. She is a senior lecturer in applied and computational mathematics at the Queensland University of Technology.

== Education and career ==
Challis has a PhD from the University of Queensland, completed in 2009. Her doctoral dissertation, Multi-Property Topology Optimisation with the Level-Set Method, was jointly supervised by Anthony P. Roberts and Andrew H. Wilkins.

She remained at the university as a postdoctoral researcher and lecturer until moving to the Queensland University of Technology as a lecturer in 2019. In 2021, she became a senior lecturer.

== Recognition ==
Challis is the 2024 recipient of the J. H. Michell Medal of ANZIAM.
