= Stefanos Chalis =

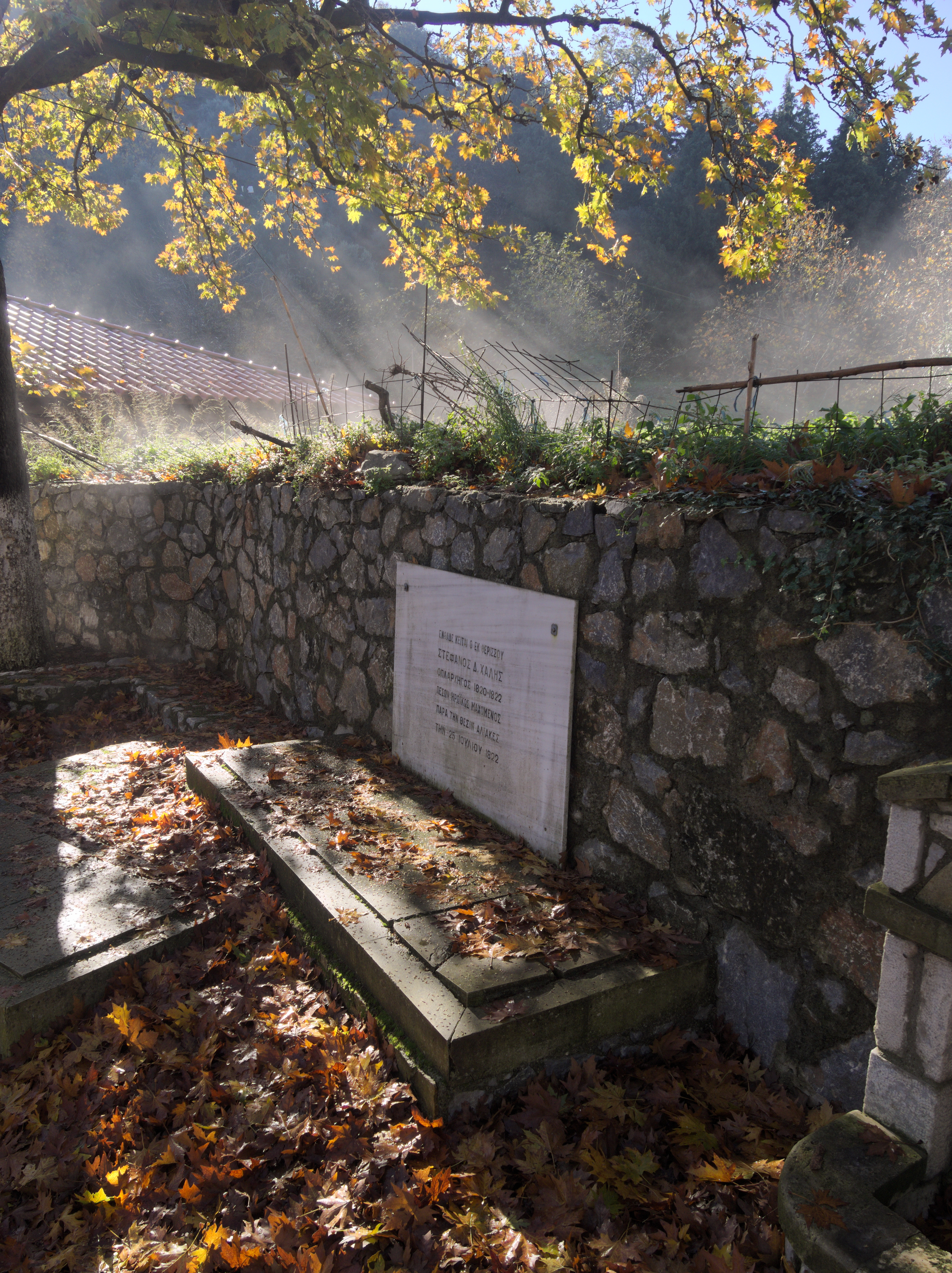
Chalis grave in Theriso

Stefanos Chalis (Greek: Στέφανος Χάλης, c. 1796 – August 19, 1821) was a Greek chieftain and a fighter of the Greek War of Independence from Crete. He was the younger brother of fighters of the Revolution, Vassilios and Ioannis, who were also notable chieftains.

== Biography ==
Chalis was born in the village Theriso near Chania circa 1796 and was the youngest son of Dimitrios Chalis, who took care the education of his children so that Stefanos and his brothers to become major recipients of education. Specifically, Stefanos was student of the renowned scholars of the time, Iakovos Manolessos and Gregorios Perdikaris. This broad education that he acquired, resulted in his appointment under the clerical staff of British consulates, initially in Crete and then in Patras. During his stay in Patras, he was initiated into the Filiki Eteria and when the revolution broke out he returned to his birthplace where he became chieftain.

He participated in the victorious for the Greek forces battle of Theriso on 15 July 1821 while on 19 August of the same year he participated in the also victorious battle on Aliakes, near Souda Bay, where he was killed during a raid.

Stefanos Chalis is also attested as a poet, singer and lyre player. According to one theory, it is claimed that Chalis is the creator of the famous traditional song Cretan song Pote Tha Kanei Xasteria (When will the sky clear).

== Bibliography ==
- Dionisios A. Kokkinos, Η Ελληνική Επανάστασις, εκδόσεις Μέλισσα, 1974, vol. 2.
- Agne Vlavianou-Arvaniti, Βασίλειος Χάλης - Η Επανάσταση του 1821 στην Κρήτη, 2004.
- Ιστορία Ελληνικού Έθνους, Εκδοτική Αθηνών, Athens 1975, vol. 12.
