= Challis (fabric) =

Lightweight woven fabric, originally of silk and worsted

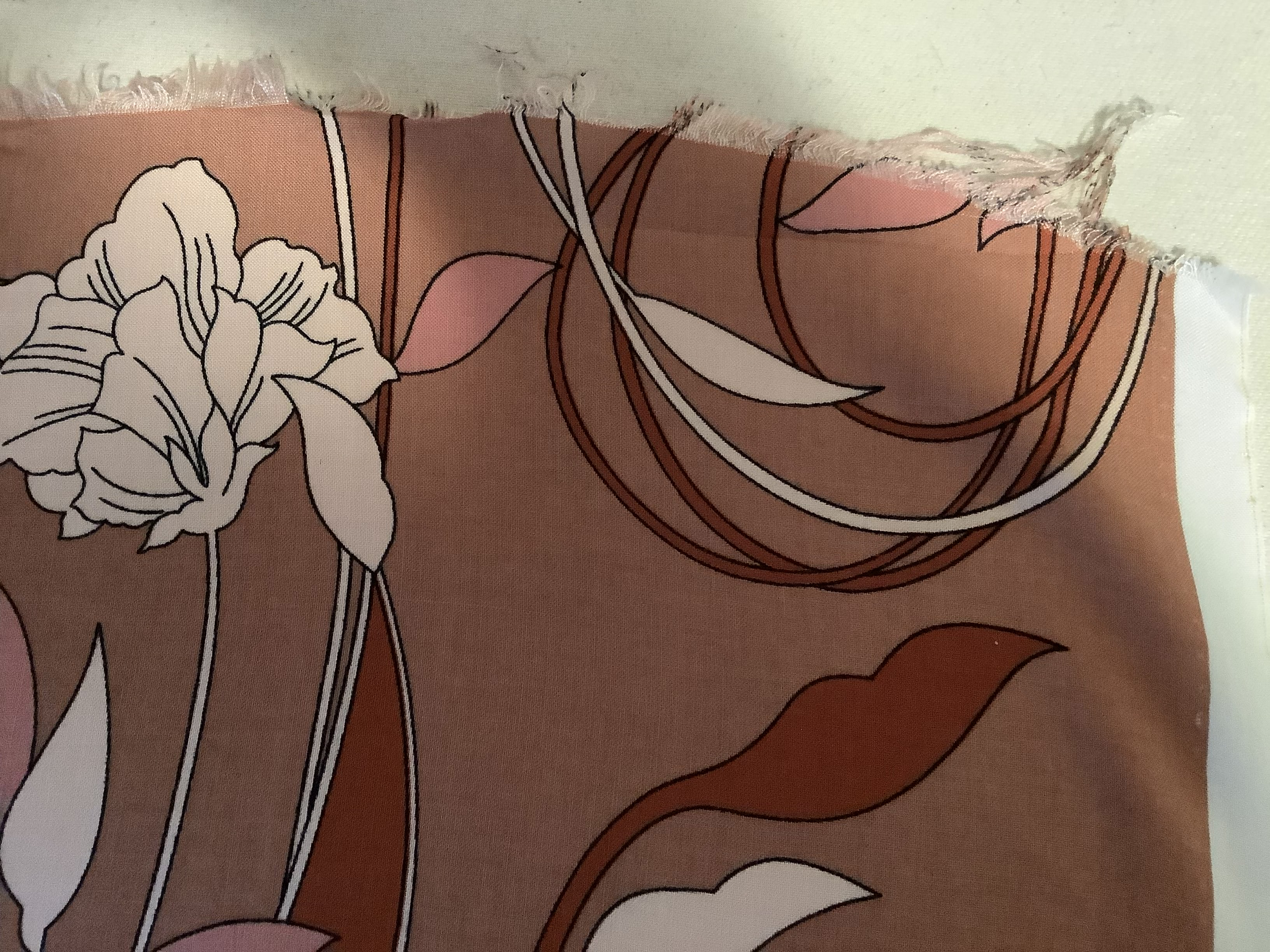
Printed rayon challis fabric

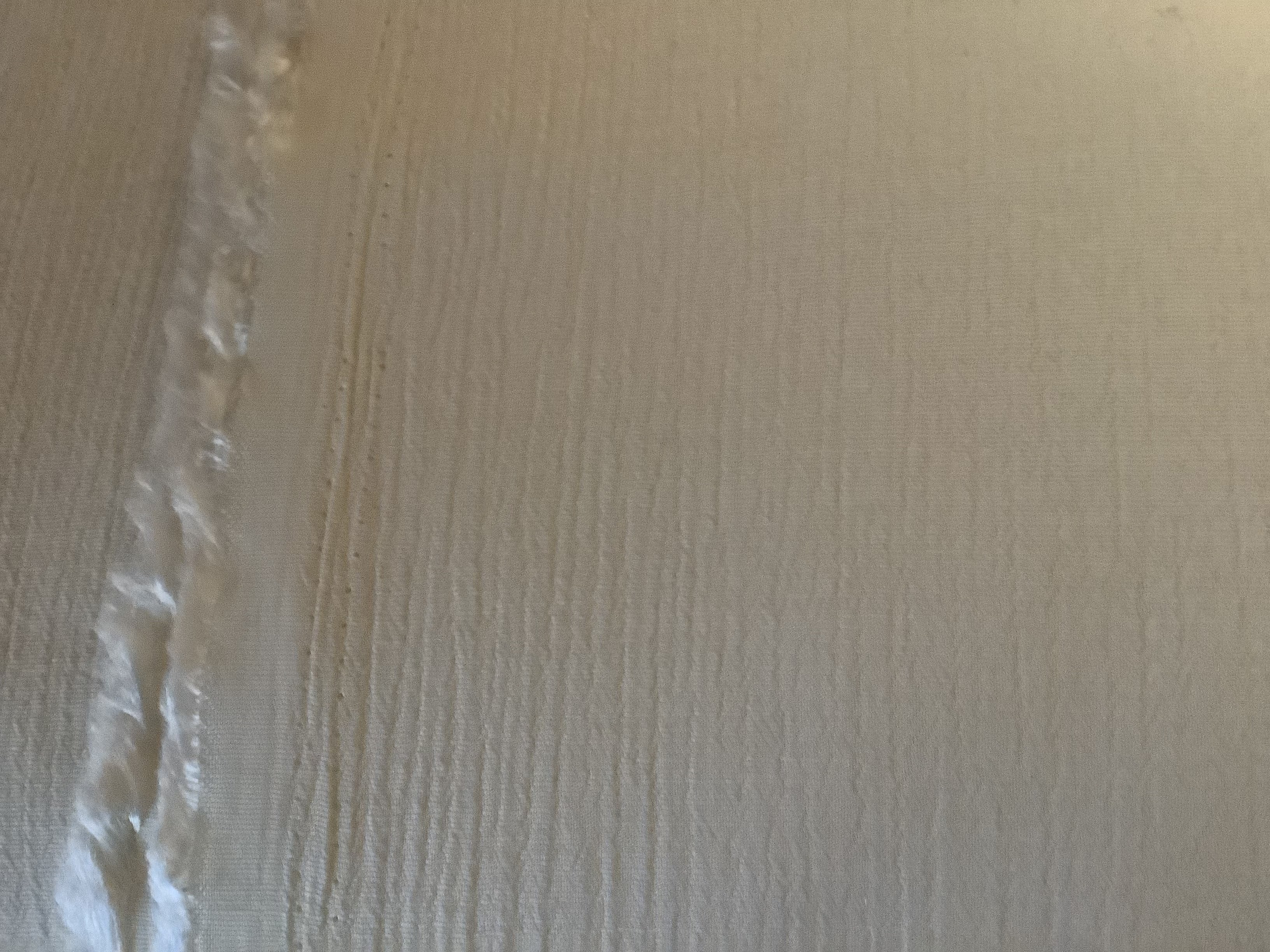
Crinkle rayon challis fabric

Challis, sometimes referred to as challie or chally, is a lightweight woven fabric, originally a silk-and-wool blend, which can also be made from a single fibre, such as cotton, silk or wool, or from man-made fabrics such as rayon. It was first manufactured in Norwich, England, in about 1832, when it was designed as a thin, soft material similar to Norwich crepe, but matte-textured rather than glossy, and more pliable. It was being exported to Australia in 1833. Challis could be made with woven designs, or printed. 'French challis' has a glossy finish. The designs were often floral, paisley, or geometric, and based on French silk patterns.

The term is derived from an Anglo-Indian word, shallee, which means 'soft'. At least one source suggests the term is American Indian.
