= Shiva Chalisa =

Hindu hymn dedicated to Shiva

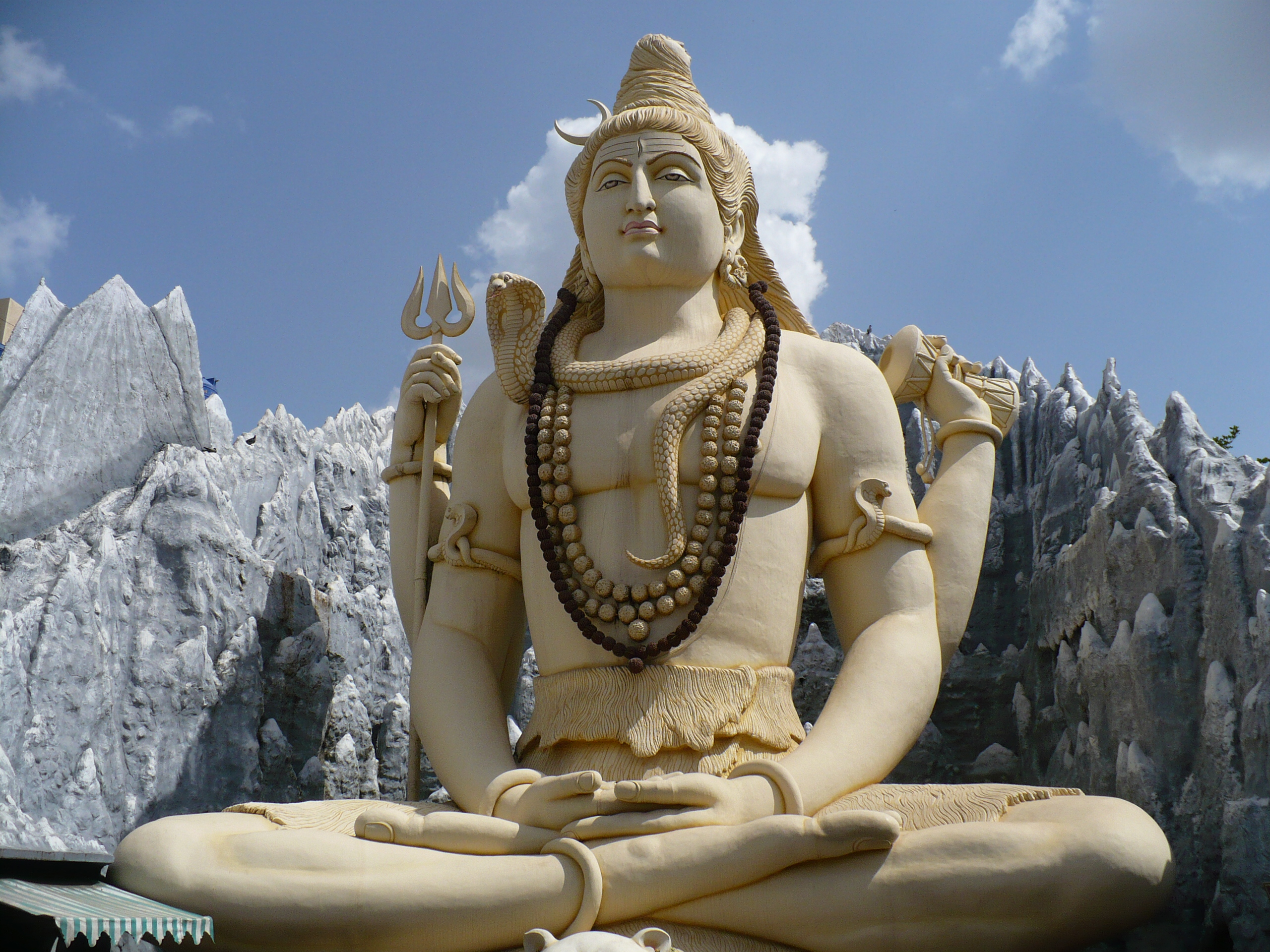
Shiva, the deity to whom the hymn is devoted

The Shiva Chalisa (Hindi: शिव चालीसा, literally Forty chaupais on Shiva) is a Hindi stotra dedicated to Hindu deity Shiva. Adapted from the Shiva Purana, it consists of 40 (chalis) chaupais (verses) and recited daily or on special festivals like Maha Shivaratri by Shaivas, the worshippers of Shiva.

== Hymn ==
The Shiva Chalisa's first stanza extols the attributes of Shiva:

jaya girijāpati dīnadayālā
sadā karata santana pratipālā
bhāla candramā sohata nīke
kānana kuṇḍala nāga phanī ke Glory to Girija’s consort Shiva, who is compassionate to the destitute, who always protects the saintly, the moon on whose forehead sheds its beautiful lustre, and in whose ears are the pendants of the cobra hood.

== See also ==
- Hanuman Chalisa, Hindu devotional hymn
