= Ramopakhyana =

Section of Indian epic Mahabharata

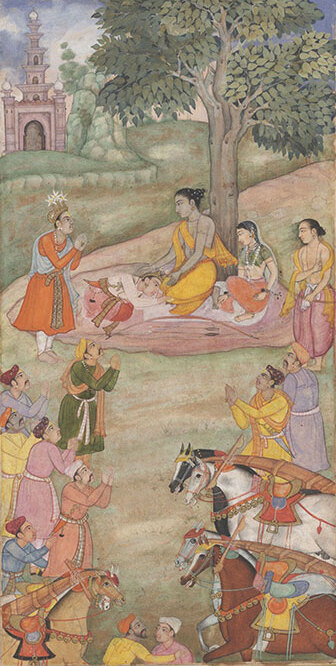
Bharata begs Rama to return from exile, from Vana Parva

Rāmopākhyāna is a section of the Indian epic Mahabharata, telling the story of Rama and Sita, a tale best known from the other great Sanskrit epic, the Ramayana.

== Content ==
The story comprises 704 verses spread across book 3 (the Vana Parva, also known as the Aranyaka-parva or Aranya-parva). In the standard numbering of the chapters of book 3, it comprises chapters 257–75.

At the beginning of the Ramopakhyana section of the Mahabharata, the character Yudhishthira has just suffered the abduction of his wife and been exiled to the forest. Asking whether there has ever been someone more unfortunate than himself, he is told the comparable story of Rama and Sita as a moralising tale, counseling him against despair. The account of Rama and Sita in the Rāmopākhyāna is noted for treating Rāma as a human rather than a divine hero; in not mentioning Sita's banishment following her return to Ayodhya; and in not mentioning how she disappears into the earth thereafter.

=== Plot summary ===
Markandeya begins with the ancestry of Rama and Sita, after which Ravana’s ancestry is narrated which deviates from that in the Ramayana. It begins with Prajapati (Brahma), who fathers Pulastya, the father of Vaishravana (Kubera). When Vaishravana deserts his father to serve Prajapati, Pulastya, in anger, creates another son, Vishravas. Prajapati favors Vaishravana, granting him dominion over Lanka. Vishravas fathers Ravana and Kumbhakarna with Kaikesi, Vibhishana with Malini and Khara and Shurpanakha with Raka. These offspring dwell in the Gandhamadana mountains and perform intense penance, earning boons from Brahma. Ravana requests invincibility except against humans; Kumbhakarna asks for endless sleep; and Vibhishana seeks righteousness and is granted immortality. Ravana later overthrows Kubera and seizes Lanka, earning a curse. Vibhishana, loyal to Kubera, departs with him. Ravana then begins to terrorize the gods. They complain to Brahma, who reveals that Vishnu has already incarnated to destroy Ravana. The gods are instructed to sire sons through vanara to aid in this mission. Dundubhi becomes the servant Manthara.

Dasharatha's eldest son Rama is born, endowed with extraordinary virtues. Dasharatha announces plans to appoint Rama as his heir. Manthara informs queen Kaikeyi, who reminds the king of an old promise to grant her two boons. She demands that her son Bharata be made king, and that Rama and his brother Lakshmana be exiled. Rama, Lakshmana, and Rama’s wife Sita depart for the forest. After Dasharatha dies, Bharata refuses the throne, serving instead as regent from Nandigrama. Rama resides in the Dandaka forest, where he maims Shurpanakha, prompting her to flee to her brother Ravana. Ravana consults his old minister Maricha. Though wary, Maricha is coerced into aiding Ravana. Disguising himself as a golden deer, Maricha lures Rama away from his hermitage. Sita asks Rama to capture the deer. Rama pursues and kills it, but as Maricha dies, he mimics Rama’s voice, calling for help. Alarmed, Sita sends Lakshmana to assist. Though skeptical, he eventually goes after Rama. Ravana then appears in disguise before Sita, attempting to seduce her. When she rebuffs him, he abducts her. The vulture Jatayu witnesses this and attempts to stop Ravana. Jatayu berates Ravana and attacks, but Ravana wounds him severely. As Sita is carried off, she drops her jewelry as a trail, and later, her robe in view of five apes on a mountain plain. Rama and Lakshmana return to find her gone. During their search, they find the dying Jatayu, who tells them of Ravana’s crime before dying. Continuing south, the brothers encounter the demon Kabandha, who captures Lakshmana. Together they slay Kabandha, who is revealed to be a cursed Gandharva. Freed, he instructs them to seek out the monkey Sugriva, who can help locate Ravana’s stronghold in Lanka.

Rama, grieving for Sita, is comforted by Lakshmana. They ascend Mount Rishyamuka and meet Sugriva, who shows Sita’s robe. They form an alliance: Rama will kill Sugriva’s rival Vali, and Sugriva will help find Sita. In the forest of Kishkindha, Sugriva challenges Vali. Vali's wife Tara warns him, but he suspects her of betrayal. In the ensuing duel, Rama kills Vali on Sugriva’s signal. Sugriva then claims Kishkindha and Tara. Rama spends four months on Mount Malyavat during the rainy season. Meanwhile, Ravana confines Sita and has her guarded by demonesses who threaten to eat her. Despite this, Sita remains devoted to Rama. The demoness Trijata recounts a prophetic dream from the rakshasa Avindhya: Ravana, cursed to impotence, will die along with his followers; Vibhishana will survive and rule on Mount Shveta. Portents begin to emerge, foretelling Rama’s victory and his eventual reunion with Sita. Ravana visits Sita in full regal splendor and attempts to woo her with promises and praise. Sita scorns his advances. Though rejected, Ravana remains courteous and refrains from harming her. As autumn arrives, Rama notes the season’s change and begins to suspect that Sugriva is neglecting his promise. He sends Lakshmana to remind the monkey king of their agreement. Sugriva welcomes Lakshmana and reports that search parties have been dispatched and should return soon. Together they inform Rama. All parties return empty-handed except for the one that went south. After two months, Hanuman and his group are spotted playfully ravaging a nearby grove, lifting Rama’s spirits.

At Rama’s request, Hanuman recounts their journey: they had entered a cave where they encountered the ascetic Prabhavati in a celestial palace. She fed them and directed them to the ocean’s shore. At the ocean, despairing of finding Sita, the monkeys resolved to fast unto death. While discussing Jatayu, they are joined by his brother Sampati, who, upon hearing of Jatayu’s death and Rama’s grief, reveals the location of Lanka. Encouraged, Hanuman leaps across the ocean, discovers Sita, and informs her of Rama’s alliance with the monkey armies. Sita gives him tokens to prove their encounter. The monkey forces rally to Rama, and he advances with Hanuman leading the vanguard. They arrive at the ocean. Rama rejects various ideas for crossing it and eventually prays, after which the ocean god appears in a dream. Rama threatens him, prompting the deity to advise that the monkey Nala construct a causeway. The causeway is built, and Vibhishana visits Rama, who acknowledges him as the rightful king of the rakshasas. The army takes a month to cross over into Lanka. Ravana fortifies the city. Angada is sent as an envoy to demand Sita’s release. Enraged, Ravana refuses, but Angada escapes.

Rama launches his war against Lanka, and the battle culminates in the city's devastation. Ravana personally enters the battle, while other rakshasas confront Lakshmana and the monkey generals. Prahasta is slain by Vibhishana. Dhumraksha scatters the monkeys but is killed by Hanuman. Ravana then commands Kumbhakarna to fight. Kumbhakarna wreaks havoc on the monkey forces and captures Sugriva. Lakshmana slays Kumbhakarna, and he and Hanuman also defeat Vajravega and Pramathin. Ravana now sends his son Indrajit into the fray. Indrajit battles with Lakshmana, Angada, and later Rama, eventually subduing them. Rama and Lakshmana become ensnared in a net of magical arrows. Vibhishana revives them and introduces a yaksha messenger from Kubera who brings water that enables them to see their invisible foes. Lakshmana then kills Indrajit. Ravana, devastated by the loss of his son, considers killing Sita in vengeance but is persuaded by the sage Avindhya to instead confront Rama. The monkey warriors devastate Ravana’s forces. In desperation, Ravana resorts to magic. Indra’s charioteer Matali appears and instructs Rama on how to defeat the demon. Rama and Ravana engage in a climactic duel, and Rama kills Ravana with an enchanted arrow, causing him to disintegrate.

The gods honor Rama for his victory. He grants Lanka to Vibhishana. Avindhya brings Sita before Rama, but he refuses to accept her, stating that he has merely fulfilled his duty. This shocks Sita and the others. Brahma, along with the gods Agni, Vayu, and the Dikpalas—and Dasharatha himself—appear. Sita appeals to the elements to affirm her purity. Vayu, Agni and Varuna vindicate her. Reassured by Brahma and Dasharatha, Rama accepts Sita and is told that he is destined to rule Ayodhya. He rewards Avindhya and Trijata, and receives boons from Brahma: righteousness, victory, and the revival of the fallen monkeys. Sita grants Hanuman immortality for as long as Rama’s name endures. Rama returns to the mainland on the Pushpaka chariot, generously rewarding the monkey warriors. He appoints Angada as the young king and reunites with his brothers Bharata and Shatrughna. Vasistha and Vamadeva perform Rama’s coronation. He allows Sugriva and Vibhishana to leave, and returns the Pushpaka chariot to Kubera. Rama goes on to perform ten ashvamedha yajna.

== Origins ==
According to W. J. Johnson, 'most current scholarship believes it to have been derived from a memorized version of the story drawn from the northern recension of the Rāmāyaṇa prior to the completion of that text as we now have it'.

== Editions and translations ==
- Kisari Mohan Ganguli (trans.), The Mahabharata of Krishna-Dwaipayana Vyasa (Calcutta: Bharata, 1883–96). In this widely used translation, the Ramopakhyayana appears at book 3, chapters 275-90.
- Peter Scharf, Ramopakhyana: The Story of Rama in the Mahabharata. An Independent-study Reader in Sanskrit (London: RoutledgeCurzon, 2003), ISBN 978-1-136-84655-7.
- Pendyala Venkata Subrahmanya Sastry worte a critical analysis of Ramopakhyana by Errana entitled Ramopakhyanamu-Tadvimarsanamu (1938) in Telugu language, who is one of the authors of Mahabharata.
