= Raavan (TV series) =

Indian mythological drama television series

- A promotional logo image of Raavan
- Created by: Films & Shots Productions
- Written by: Umesh Chandra Upadhyay, Chandan N Singh
- Directed by: Ranjan Singh
- Opening theme: Raavan
- Country of origin: India
- No. of seasons: 3
- No. of episodes: 105

Production
- Running time: 52 minutes

Original release
- Network: Zee TV
- Release: 18 November 2006 – 16 November 2008

Raavan is an Indian mythological drama series aired on Zee TV from 18 November 2006 to 16 November 2008, based on the life of the primary antagonist of the epic Ramayana, Ravana.

== Cast ==
- Narendra Jha - Dasanan Ravan (10-headed King of Lanka)
  - Tapasvi Mehta - Child Dasanan Ravan
  - Jay Soni - Teenage Dasanan Ravan
- Rajesh Singh - Kumbhkaran
  - Kavin Dave - Teenage Kumbhkaran
- Sandeep Bhanushali/Ehsaan Khan - Vibhishan
  - Meghan Jadhav- Teenage Vibhishan
- Ratan Rajput / Divya Dwivedi - Chandranakha (Dasanan Ravan's sister)
- Ravee Gupta - Kaikesi (Dasanan, Kumbhkaran,Vibhishan & Chandranakha's mother, Maharashi Vishrava's wife)
- Rajendra Gupta - Sumali (Malyavan's brother & Dasanan's grandfather)
- Arun Mathur - Malyavan (Sumali's elder brother)
- Sunil Singh - Prahasta (Sumali's son)

=== Supporting Cast ===
- Mahendra Ghule - Akampana (Sumali's son)
- Sanjeev Siddharth - Dand (Sumali's Son)
- Sanjeev Tyagi - Dhumraksh (Sumali's son)
- Shailendra Srivastav - Mayasura (Mandodari's Father)
- Manasi Salvi / Rashami Desai - Mandodari (Queen of Lanka & Dasanan Ravan's wife)
- Shashi Sharma - Tadka ( Marecch & Subahu's mother)
- Gajendra Chauhan - Maharaj Dasharath (King of Ayodhya)
- Diwakar Pundir - Shri Ram (Avatar of Bhagwan Vishnu/Husband of Sita)
  - Chirag Ruia - Child Lord Ram
- Ujjwal Rana - Sumitranandan Lakshman (Younger brother of Shri Ram, Bharat & twin brother Shatrughna)
  - Paras Arora - Child Lakshman
- Namrata Thapa - Janaknandini Sita (Wife of Shri Ram)
- Shweta Dadhich - Kaushalya (Shri Ram's mother & Dasharath's first wife)
- Sonia Kapoor - Kaikeyi (Bharat's mother & Dasharath's second wife)
- Yashodhan Rana - Shiva
- Amit Pachori - Hanuman (Avatar of Kalashpati Shankar (Shiva) & Shri Ram's true devotee)
- Shahbaaz Khan - Mahishmati Raj Kartavirya Sahastrarjun/Patalok Raj Ahiravan (Double Role/Dasanan Ravan's Cousin)
- Richa Soni - Chitrangada (Ravan's second wife)
- Alihassan Turabi - Patalok Raj Mahiravan (Brother of Ahiravan/Dasanan Ravan's Cousin)
- Nimai Bali- Bali, (Sugriv's twin brother & Devraj Indra's son)
- Vinod Kapoor - Maharashi Gautam/Maharashi Agastya (Double Role/Ahilya's husband)
- Pawan Chopra - Kuber (Dasanan Ravan's elder brother)
- Malini Kapoor - Devayani(Sage Shukracharya's daughter)
- Anjali Rana - Manorama (Ravan's second wife's best friend)
- Pankaj Bhatia - Shrihari Vishnu (Preserver of the Universe)
- Radhakrishna Dutta - Rishi Vishrava (Father of Kuber, Dasanan Ravan, Kumbhkaran, Vibishan, Chandranakha)
- Tarakesh Chauhan - Guru Vashistha
- Anil Yadav - Vishwamitra
- Sanjay Swaraj - Parashurama
- Ranjeev Verma - Virupaksha (Malyavan’s son)
- Sunil Nagar - Jamdagni (Father of Parashurama)
- Jassi Singh - Mali (Younger brother of Malyavan and Sumali, killed by Shrihari Vishnu)
