= List of characters in the Ramayana =

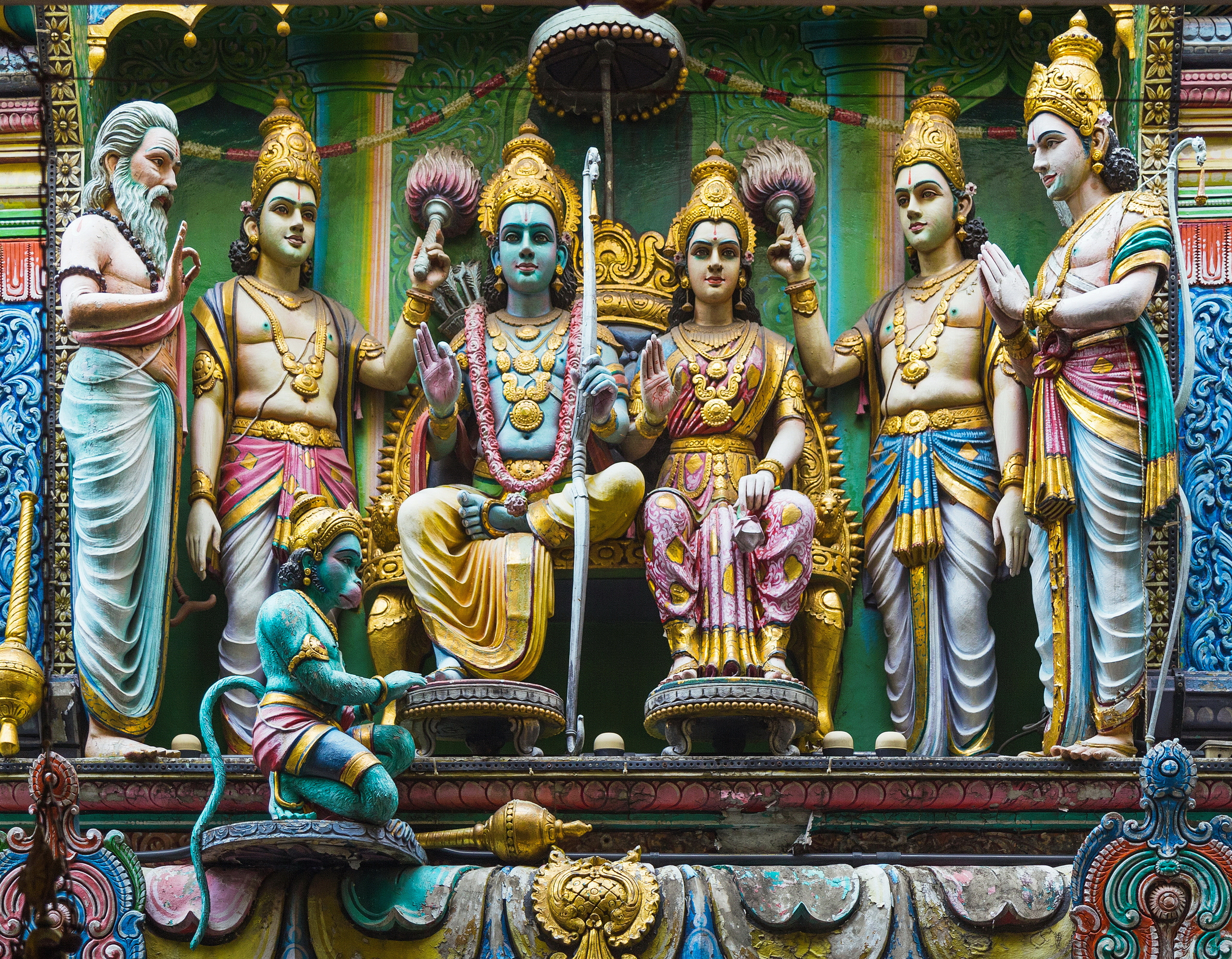
Ramayana characters - Rama and Sita enthroned, surrounded by sage Vasishtha and Rama's brothers Lakshmana, Bharata, and Shatrughna. Hanuman seated at the feet of Rama.

The Ramayana is one of the two major Sanskrit ancient epics of Hindu literature. It is attributed to the sage Valmiki. This is a list of important figures that appear in the epic.

== A ==
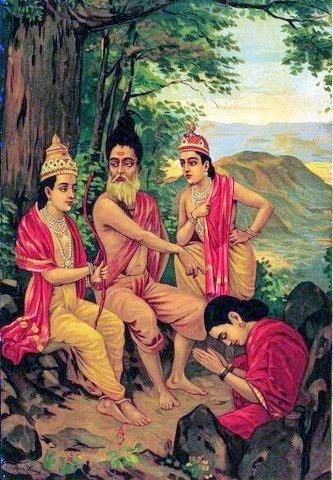
Rama releasing Ahalya from her curse. Lakshmana and Sage Vishvamitra are present.

- Agastya: A rishi (sage). Son of sage Pulastya and brother of sage Vishrava. He was an uncle of Ravana. Agastya and his wife Lopamudra met Rama, Sita, and Lakshmana during their exile and gave them a divine bow and arrow.
- Ahalya: Wife of the sage Gautama Maharishi. Many Hindu scriptures say that she was seduced by Indra (the king of the gods), who disguised as sage Gautama and entered inside her cottage. She was cursed by her husband for infidelity, and liberated from the curse by Rama (an avatar of Vishnu).
- Akampana: A maternal uncle of Ravana. He was one of ten sons of Sumali and Ketumathi. He also had four sisters. He was one of the survivors of the battle between Khara and Dushana along with Shurpanakha. After escaping the deadly carnage, he instigated Ravana to kidnap Sita, thus indirectly making him one of the masterminds behind the war. Later he was killed in the battle by Hanuman.
- Akshayakumara: Youngest son of Ravana and Mandodari. He was killed by Hanuman during the encounter in the Ashoka Vatika.
- Angada: A vanara and the son of Vali and Tara. He was the grandson of Indra, the king of devas and the nephew of Sugriva. Angada led the southward search party, which consisted of Hanuman, Jambavan, Nala and Nila which successfully located Sita in Lanka. He was dispatched by Rama to Ravana's court as an envoy but Ravana rejected all the negotiations for peace, seeing this, he challenged Ravana and his courtiers to move his leg but nobody succeed and Ravana himself bent down for the challenge his crown fell, he catched threw it out of palace which then fell in Rama's feet. In the battle, he killed Narantaka, one of Ravana's son and Mahaparshava.
- Añjanā: Mother of Hanuman. According to a version of the legend, Añjanā was an apsara named Puñjikastalā, who was born on earth as a vanara princess and married Kesari, a vanara chief. In some Shaiva traditions, Vayu, the god of the wind, carried the divine power of Shiva to Anjana's womb, and thus Hanuman was born as an incarnation of Shiva.
- Atikaya: Son of Ravana and his second wife Dhanyamalini. He was killed by Lakshmana by the Brahmastra, after the advice given by Vayu at the behest of Indra, that an otherwise invincible armour of Brahma was granted to Atikaya, that could only be pierced by a Brahmastra, during the battle when Lakshmana struggled to kill Atikaya.

== B ==
- Bharata: The second son of Dasharatha, born to Kaikeyi, and the younger half brother of Rama. He was married to Sita's cousin Mandavi with whom he had two children.
- Bhaskarna: King of Nisthal. Maternal Uncle of Ravana.

== C ==
- Chandrabhaga: Wife of Janaka's younger brother Kushadhvaja. Chandrabhagha 's two daughters Mandavi and Shrutakirti were married to Rama's younger brothers Bharata and Shatrughna respectively.

== D ==
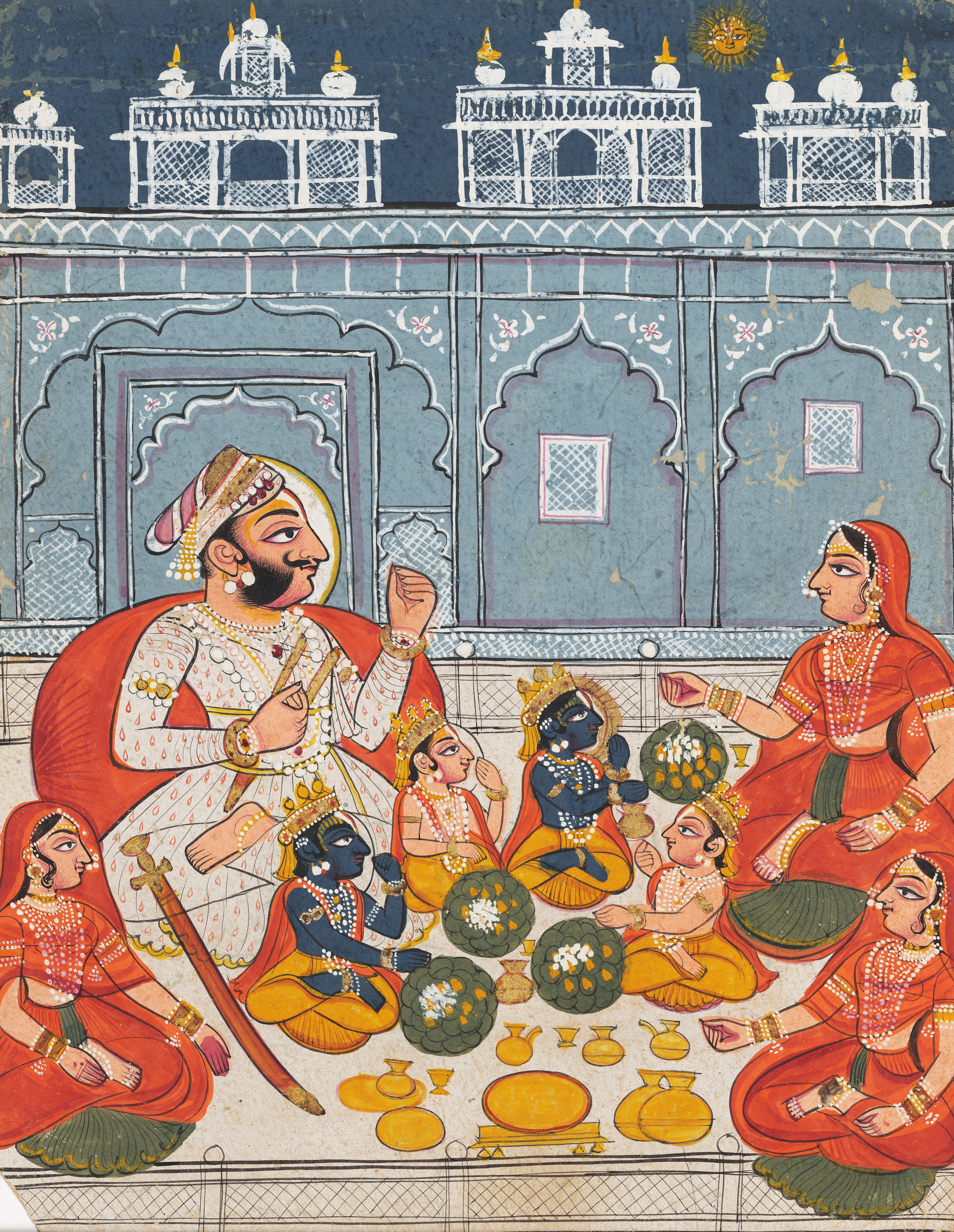
Rama and his brothers in the company of Dasharatha and his three queens.

- Dasharatha: King of Ayodhya. He had three queens, Kaushalya, Kaikeyi and Sumitra, and four sons: Rama, Bharata, and twins Lakshmana, Shatrughna. Dasharatha also had a daughter named Shanta. Once, Kaikeyi saved Dasharatha in a battle, and as a reward, she acquired two boons from her husband to be invoked at a later time. Manipulated by Manthara, she asked Dasharatha to make their son Bharata the crown prince and send Rama into exile for a period of fourteen years. Dasharatha died heartbroken after Rama went into exile.
- Devantaka: A son of Ravana who was described as a warrior with a machete as his weapon. He was killed by Hanuman in a duel.
- Dhanyamalini: The second wife of Ravana. Her origin is unknown but some stories refer to her as the daughter of Maya and sister of Mandodari. She was the mother of Atikaya.
- Dhumraksha: A maternal uncle of Ravana and one of ten sons of Sumali. He was killed by Hanuman.
- Dundubhi: A rakshasa who takes the form of a buffalo with a body as enormous as a mountain. He challenged Vali, the vanara king of Kishkindha at the gates of his capital. Vali fought and slayed him after a duel and throwed his carcass so far that it fell near the ashram of Sage Matanga. When Sugriva showed his skeleton to Rama, he hits it with just his great toe and it got pushed further away.
- Dushana: A man-eating rakshasa. He is the twin brother of Khara, the younger male cousin of Ravana, and son of Kaikesi's sister Raka. They were demons who ruled the Dandaka Forest. After Lakshmana humiliated Shurpanakha by cutting off her nose and ears, Khara and Dushana went to war against Lakshmana and Rama. During this fight, Dushana was killed by Rama.

== G ==
- Ganga: A river goddess and the daughter of Himavan. Because of her incomparable beauty, she was given to the devas. At Bhagiratha's request, she assumed the form of a river and flowed down to the earth with the assistance of Shiva and became the river Ganga.
- Guha: The king of Śṛṅgiverapura, a nation of the Nishadas, and one of the allies of Rama. He helps the deity and his companions be ferried across the river Ganga during his exile.

== H ==
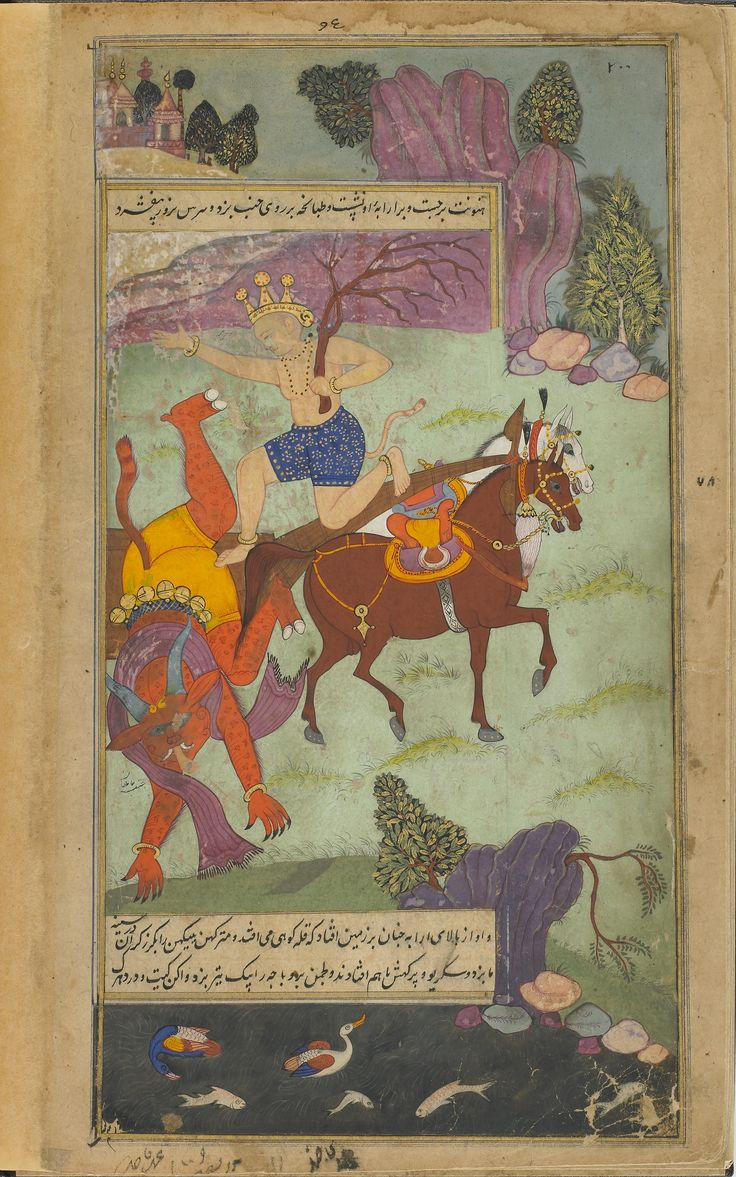
Hanuman fells Jambumali

- Hanuman: A divine vanara companion and devotee of the god Rama. Hanuman is one of the central figures of the epic. He is a brahmachari (life long celibate) and one of the chiranjivis.
- Hema: An apsara in Indra's court. When Mayasura visited Svarga, he saw and married her. They had two sons, Mayavi and Dundubhi, and a daughter named Mandodari. She later left them and returned to Svarga.

== I ==
- Indrajit (Meghanada): The elder son of Ravana mothered by Mandodari and a prince of Lanka. In the epic, he is described to be a great warrior and master of illusions. he is also known as Indrari.

== J ==
- Jambavan: The king of the bears. He was created by Brahma to assist Rama in his struggle against Ravana.
- Janaka: The king of Mithila and the father of Sita and Urmila.
- Jambumali: One of the eight sons of Lanka's commander-in-chief Prahasta. He was killed by Hanuman during the encounter in the Ashoka Vatika
- Jatayu: A divine bird and the younger son of Aruṇa. He was an old friend of Dasharatha (Rama's father). Jatayu's wings were lopped off and he was killed by Ravana when he tried to save Sita during her abduction.

== K ==
- Kabandha: A gandharva, cursed by sage Shtulashira to become a repulsive demon with no head or neck but his mouth in the belly and a single fiery eye on the chest along extremely long arms. He was freed from the curse when his arms were sliced off by Rama and Lakshmana and he was cremated.
- Kaikasi (Nikasha, Malini, Sukeshi): A wife of sage Vishrava, and mother of Ravana, Kumbhakarna, Vibhishana, and Shurpanakha. She was a daughter of the daitya king Sumali by his wife Ketumati/Ketumali. Her elder sisters, Raka and Pushpotkata, were also wives of Vishrava.
- Kaikeyi: The third and most favorable wife of King Dasharatha, and mother of Bharata. After she saved the life of Dasharatha in battle, he offered to grant anything she would ask of him. She later calls in this favour to have Bharata crowned king and Rama sent into the forest, manipulated by the words of her maid, Manthara.
- Kausalya: The mother of Rama and the first wife of King Dasharatha.
- Khara: man-eating rakshasa. He is the twin brother of Dushana, younger male cousin of Ravana, and son of Kaikasi's sister Raka. He was killed by Rama and Lakshmana when he attacked Rama after Shurpanakha's humiliation. After Lakshmana cut off Shurpanakha's nose and ears, Khara fought against Lakshmana and Rama. During this fight, Khara lost and was killed by Rama, who also killed his brothers Dushana and Trishiras.
- Kumbhakarna: The second son of Vishrava and Kaikasi. He was the younger brother of Ravana and the elder brother of Vibhishana and Shurpanakha. Despite his gigantic size and great appetite, he was described to be of good character and a great warrior in those times. When offered a boon by Brahma, he was tricked into asking for eternal sleep. A horrified Ravana, out of brotherly love, persuaded Brahma to amend the boon. Brahma mitigated the power of the boon by making Kumbhakarna sleep for six months and being awake for the rest six months of a year (in some versions, he is awake for one day out of the year). He was one of the rakshasas who opposed Ravana's abduction of Sita.
- Kusha: One of the two sons of Rama and Sita. He was the twin brother of Lava.

== L ==
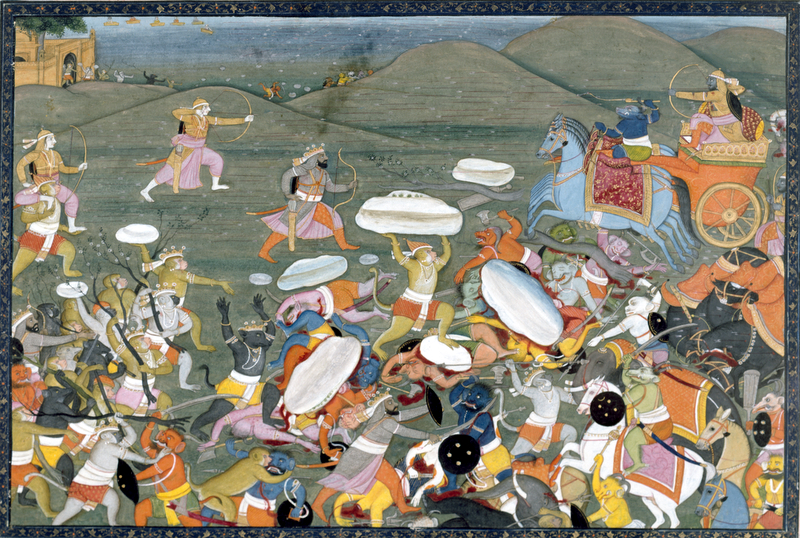
Meghanada fights against Lakshmana.

- Lakshmana: The third son of King Dasharatha, and a half-brother of Rama. He was the twin brother of Shatrughna, both born to queen Sumitra. In some traditions, he is regarded to be an incarnation of Shesha. He was deeply devoted to his brother, whom he followed through many dangerous adventures and quests. He was married to Sita's younger sister, Urmila. He is stated to have guarded his brother Rama and Sita during their exile for fourteen years without sleeping .
- Lava: One of the two sons of Rama and Sita. He had a twin brother named Kusha, one of the youths to whom Valmiki taught the Ramayana.
- Lankini: A powerful demoness from the ancient Hindu epic Ramayana. Her name literally means "the woman of Lanka" as she was the female personification of the city itself and was the guardian to the doors of Lanka.

== M ==
- Mali: A son of rakshasa king Sukesa and gandharva princess Devavati.[14] He had two elder brothers Malyavana and Sumali. He was the maternal granduncle of Ravana, Kumbhakarna, Shurpanakha and Vibhishana.
- Malyavan: A maternal granduncle of Ravana and his siblings. He was one of three sons of Sukesha. He had two younger brothers named Sumali and Mali. Malyavan's wife was Sundari. He had seven sons - Vajramusthi, Virupaksha, Durmukha, Suptaghna, Yajnakopa, Matta, Unmatta, and a daughter named Anala. He was one of the rakshasas who opposed Ravana's abduction of Sita.
- Mandavi: The daughter of King Kushadhvaja and Queen Chandrabhaga. She was a cousin of Sita and Urmila. She also had a younger sister named Shrutakirti. Mandavi was married to Rama's brother Bharata. After the Ramayana, she became the queen of Gandhara and had two sons, Pushkala and Taksha, who founded Peshawar, then called Purushapura, and Takshashila, now called Taxila, respectively.
- Mandodari: The chief consort of Ravana. The epic describes her as beautiful, pious, and righteous. Mandodari was the daughter of Mayasura and an apsara named Hema. Mandodari bears two sons: Meghanada (Indrajit) and Akshayakumara. She was one of the rakshasas who opposed Ravana's abduction of Sita.
- Manthara: The maid of Kaikeyi. She is said to be hump-backed, ugly and antagonistic in appearance. She manipulates Kaikeyi into fears that her position would be overshadowed by Kausalya after the coronation of Rama, persuading her mistress to invoke her boons and send Rama into his exile.
- Maricha: A rakshasa (demon) who plays a role in the kidnapping of Sita, Rama's wife, by assuming the form of a golden deer. His mother was Tataka and brother was Subahu, who were killed by Rama earlier in the story.
- Mātali: The charioteer of Indra, the king of the devas. Indra sent him to lend his assistance to Rama, due to the fact that the prince fought afoot against Ravana, who rode upon a chariot. He descended upon the earth and offered his obeisance to Rama, stating that he had been sent by Indra. He offered the prince the deity's own vimana, great bow, arrows, shield, and spear to help him triumph over Ravana.
- Matanga: A rishi(sage) who resided in his ashram at the foothill of Rishyamukha mountain. He was the spiritual mentor of Shabari, an elderly ascetic at his ashram. He instructed Shabari to perform a penance and told her wait for Rama's arrival in order to attain ''moksha''. Once he cursed Vali, the vanara king of Kishkindha that he would die immediately whenever he comes to the Rishyamukha mountain as he threw the carcass of Dundubhi, a rakshasa having the form of a giant buffalo and it fell near the sage's ashram.
- Mayavi: A rakshasa and brother of Dundubhi, a rakshasa in buffalo's form. Dundubhi was killed by Vali, the vanara king of Kishkindha earlier. One night, Mayavi approached the gates of Kishikandha roaring with anger and challenged Vali for a duel and he accepted his challenge. Mayavi , in fear, fled in all haste. and entered a cave, Vali chasing him also entered the cave. An intense duel took place between two for an year and Vali eventually killed him.

== N ==
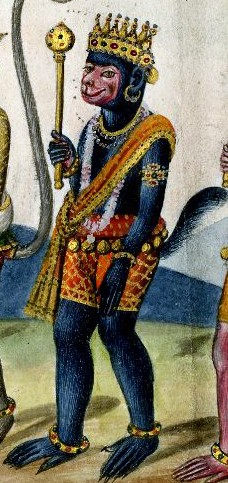
Nila

- Nala: A vanara who helped Rama during his war with Ravana. He is credited as the engineer of the Rama Setu. He was a son of Vishvakarma, and the twin brother of Nila.
- Narantaka: A son of Ravana. He was killed by Angada.
- Nila: The commander-in-chief of the vanara army in Rama's battle against Ravana. Along with his twin brother Nala, he is also credited for constructing the Rama Setu. Nila is the son of Agni.
- Nirvani: A yakshini and niece of the yaksha king Suketu.

== P ==
- Parashurama: The sixth avatar of Vishnu, present in the Ramayana in his conflict with Rama over Shiva's broken bow Pinaka, and due to the vow he had made to kill Kshatriya kings. He challenged Rama to bend Sharanga, the bow of Vishnu, and when this was done, accepted that Rama was an incarnation of Vishnu and retired to Mahendra mountain for his penance.
- Prahasta: A maternal uncle of Ravana and chief commander of Lanka's army. He was a son of Sumali and Ketumati. In the battle, he was killed by Nila, when he crushed his head beneath a boulder.
- Pulastya: A great sage, one of the Saptarshis of Svayambhu Manvantara and the grandfather of Ravana.

== R ==
- Rama: The protagonist of the epic. He is the seventh avatar of Vishnu. He was the son of King Dasharatha of the Kosala Kingdom and his senior wife, Kausalya. He is regarded to be the embodiment of justice and dharma. He marries Princess Sita of Mithila. The crux of the epic details his attempts to rescue her from Ravana's clutches at Lanka. Descendant of Harishchandra, Prithu, Bhagiratha, Trishanku through his father.
- Ravana: The rakshasa king of Lanka. He is the main antagonist of the epic. He was the son of Vishrava and Kaikashi. His kidnapping of Rama's wife Sita is the central event that sparked the conflict of the epic.
- Rishyasringa: A rishi (sage) presided over the sacrifice that King Dasharatha offered in order to get a son. He was married to Dasharatha's daughter Shanta.
- Rumā: The wife of Sugriva. She is mentioned in Book IV (Kishkindha Kanda) of the epic. Ruma and Sugriva fell in love with each other and wanted to marry each other. But Ruma's father did not approve. Hence, Sugriva with the help of Hanuman abducted Ruma and they married each other. Rumā was taken away from Sugriva by Vali following the strife of two royal vanara brothers. Later, the fact of Rumā being withheld by Vali became the primary justification of Rama's slaying Vali and helping Sugriva to become the sovereign of Kishkindha. When accused by Vali of lowly, treacherous and unexpected assassination from the shades by Rama's arrow, Rāma says his assassination was a just punishment for the sin Vali committed when he robbed Sugriva of Rumā, his wedded spouse, and used her for his own pleasure.

== S ==
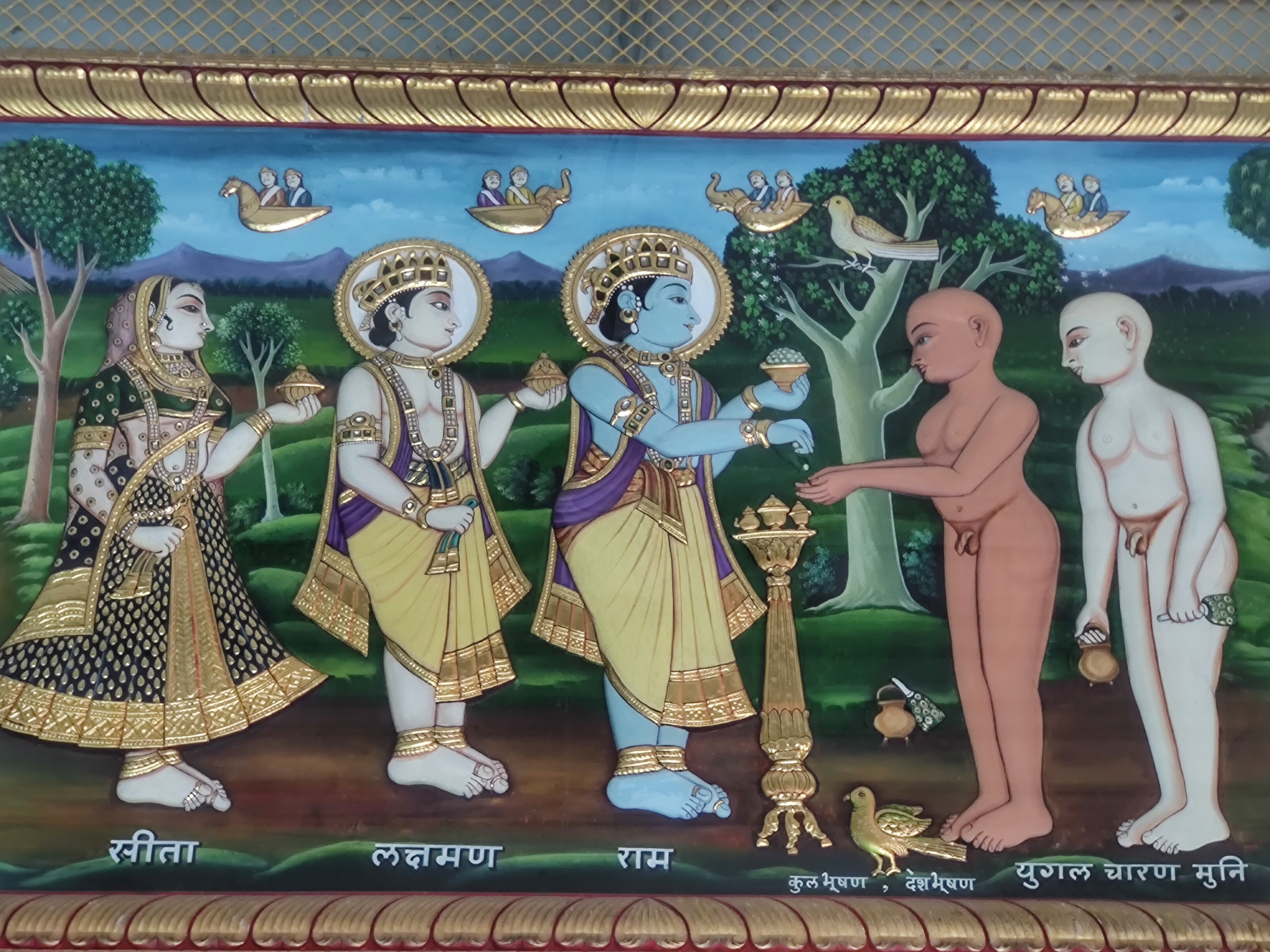
Sita in Jain Ramayana. (left)

- Sampati: A supporter of Rama. He was the brother of Jatayu and the son of Aruna. He traced Sita with his divine vision and informed Hanuman that Sita was in Lanka
- Shanta: The daughter of a King Dasharatha and his first wife Kausalya. Later she was adopted by King Romapada and queen Vershini of Anga. She was married to the sage Rishyasringa.
- Shabari: An elderly ascetic at rishi Matanga's ashram who was devoted to Rama. As her guru Matanga had instructed her to worship Rama, she waited for him for several years. Sabari finally met Rama after the abduction of Sita. She served berries Rama and Lakshmana which she had hand-picked harvested for them and when they come to her ashram, she served the sweetest berries to Rama which she kept in her basket after tasting each and every berry herself. She told Rama to find Sugriva and Hanuman.
- Shatrughna: The youngest son of King Dasharatha. He was born to queen Sumitra and was a twin brother of Lakshmana. He was married to Sita's cousin Shrutakirti with whom he had two children.
- Shiva: A part of the Trimurti, the supreme trinity in Hinduism, along with Vishnu and Brahma. Both Rama and Ravana were great to devotees of Shiva. Some versions of the epic also describe Hanuman as one of the avatars of Shiva. His wife is Parvati.
- Shrutakirti: The daughter of king Kushadhvaja and queen Chandrabhaga. She was a cousin of Sita and Urmila. She also had an elder sister Mandavi. Shrutakirti was married to Rama's brother Shatrughna.
- Shurpanakha: A rakshasi daughter of Vishrava and Kaikesi, and the younger sister of Ravana and Kumbhakarna and elder sister of Vibhishana. Her husband was Vidyutjihva, who was killed by Ravana. She met Rama during a visit to the forest of Panchavati and was instantly smitten by his youthful good looks. Rama rejected her advances, telling her that he was faithful to his wife Sita and thus would never take another wife. Rejected, Shurpanakha approached his younger brother, Lakshmana, who also rejected her. In some versions, Rama and Lakshmana taunt Shurpanakha. The humiliated and envious Shurpanakha attacked Sita but was thwarted by Lakshmana, who cut off her nose and ears (and, in some versions, her breasts) and sent her back to Lanka.
- Simhika: A Rakshasa (demoness). After meeting Mainaka and Surasa, when Hanuman was crossing the ocean to Lanka, the kingdom of the Rakshasa king Ravana, Simhika was hiding in the ocean. She captured the flying birds shadow and ate them up. Even as he flew overhead, she captured Hanuman's shadow with her magic. According to one account, forewarned about this creature by Sugriva, Hanuman expanded his size, and observed her vulnerability when she followed suit. He turned himself small and allowed her to swallow him, ripping her apart from within, slaying her before he resumed his journey. In other accounts, he merely kicked her to death.
- Sita: The reincarnation of Vedavati, Sita was raised by King Janaka of Mithila as his own daughter. She married Rama of Ayodhya and accompanied him on his exile. She is famed for her virtue and beauty and is regarded as an avatar of the goddess of prosperity, Lakshmi.
- Subahu: A rakshasa. He and his mother, Tataka, took immense pleasure in harassing the munis of the jungle, especially Vishvamitra, by disrupting their yajnas with rains of flesh and blood. Vishvamitra approached Dasharatha for help in getting rid of these pestilences. Dasharatha obliged by sending two of his sons, Rama and Lakshmana, to the forest with Vishvamitra, charging them to protect both the sage and his sacrificial fires. When Subahu and Maricha again attempted to rain flesh and blood on the sage's yajna, Subahu was killed by Rama.
- Sugriva: A vanara. He was the younger brother of Vali, whom he succeeded as ruler of the vanara the kingdom of Kishkindha. Rumā was his wife. He was the spiritual son of Surya. Sugriva aided Rama in his quest to liberate his wife Sita from the captivity at the hands of Ravana.
- Suketu: A yaksha who performed a yajna to get an heir, with the strength equal to thousand elephants. After the ritual, he got a daughter named Tataka.
- Sumali: The son of rakshasa king Sukesa and gandharva princess Devavati. He had two brothers Malyavana and Mali. Sumali was married to Ketumati with whom he had ten sons (Prahasta, Akampana, Vikata, Kalikamukha, Dhumraksha, Danda, Suprasva, Sanhradi, Praghasa, and Bhaskarna) and four daughters (Raka, Pushpotkata, Kaikasi, Kumbhinasi). One of his daughters Kaikasi was married to sage Vishrava who later gave birth to Ravana, Kumbhakarna, Vibhishana, and Shurpanakha.
- Sumantra: The prime minister in the court of Ayodhya. He was extremely loyal to the rulers of Ayodhya and was King Dasharatha's a most trusted minister. He knew many secrets about the royal family, including what he had heard from the conversation between King Dasharatha and Durvasa. He helped Rama in his exile.
- Sumitra: The second wife of King Dasharatha of Ayodhya. She was the mother of the twins Lakshmana and Shatrughna.
- Sunayana: The queen of Mithila, wife of King Janaka, and the mother of Sita and Urmila.
- Surasa: One of the 12 daughters of Daksha, who are married to the sage Kashyapa. She became the mother of the Uragas (a class of serpents). In Ramayana, she consented and obstructed Hanuman's path in the sea on the command of Devas to test Hanuman's abilities and declared that Hanuman is the food provided to her by the gods and tries to eat him. She told him that he can pass only through her mouth, as per a boon given to her. Hanuman countered her by challenging to open her mouth wide enough to eat him and expanded his body size as large as a mountain. She also expanded her jaws so she can devour Hanuman.Finally when her mouth expanded to a 100 yojanas, Hanuman suddenly assumed a tiny form (size of a thumb) and entered her mouth and left it, before she can close it. Impressed by Hanuman's "ingenuity and courage", she assumed her true form and blessed Hanuman.
- Sanhadaman: Son of Bhaskarna. Cousin of Ravana
- Sahasramukharavana: Brother of Ravana. Father of Vajrabahu. (Adbhuta Ramayana)

== T ==
- Tara: The wife of Vali, and the mother of Angada. She was the queen of Kishkindha and is regarded as one of the panchakanyas.
- Tataka: A beautiful woman who was transformed into a demon (rakshasa) once she tried to seduce the sage Agastya. As a demon, she used to drink the blood of living creatures and used to kill anything she sees. In one of Rama's great acts, he broke her curse by slaying her.
- Trijata: A demoness who was assigned the duty of guarding Sita who was kidnapped by the king of Lanka. In later adaptions of Ramayana, she is described as the daughter of Vibhishana.
- Trishira: A son of Ravana and Dhanyamalini. He had three heads. His brothers were Atikaya, Narantaka and Devantaka. He was killed by Rama in the battle.

== U ==
- Urmila: The younger daughter of King Janaka and queen Sunayana, and the younger sister of Sita. She married Lakshmana and had two sons, Angada and Chandraketu. In the Garga Samhita, she is stated to be an avatar of Nagalakshmi. Urmila slept continuously for fourteen years, so that her husband could protect Rama and Sita during the exile.

== V ==
- Vajrabahu: Son of Sahasramukharavana. Husband of Padma. (Adbhuta Ramayana)
- Vali: A vanara king of Kishkindha. He was a spiritual son of Indra, the biological son of Vriksharaja, the elder brother of Sugriva, husband of Tara, and father of Angada. He is slain by Rama.
- Vasishtha: A sage and the guru of King Dasharatha, offering religious advice to the king and the royal family.
- Vibhishana: A younger brother of Ravana. Though a rakshasa himself, Vibhishana was of a noble character. When Ravana kidnapped Sita, he advised Ravana to return her to her husband Rama in an orderly fashion and promptly which Ravana refused sternly. When Ravana did not heed his advice and threw him out of the kingdom, Vibhishana deserted Ravana and joined Rama's army. Later, when Rama defeated Ravana, Rama crowned Vibhishana as the king of Lanka.
- Vidyutjihva: A danava and the husband of Ravana's sister Shurpanakha.
- Vishrava: The son of Pulatsya, the brother of the sage Agastya and the grandson of Brahma. His first wife was Ilavida with whom he had a son named Kubera. Later, he also married the rakshasa princess Kaikasi with whom he had three sons (Ravana, Kumbhakarna, and Vibhishana) and a daughter (Shurpanakha).
- Vishvamitra: A sage who was once a king. Through long meditation, he gained a number of spiritual powers. He took Rama on a quest to defeat a demon and to lift the bow of Shiva.
