= Pulastya =

Sage in Hinduism

Genealogy
- Parents: Brahma (father)
- Spouse: Manini (Havirbhu), Priti, Havirbhu (another) and Svayamvara
- Children: Vishrava, Agastya by Manini, Dattoli, Sadvati (Sambhuti), Devabahu, Vinita and some Vanaras by Priti. Some Gandharvas by Havirbhu. Some Kinnaras from Svayamvara.

Pulastya (Sanskrit: पुलस्त्य) is one of the ten Prajapati, and one of the mind-born sons of Brahma in Hinduism. He is also one of the Saptarshi (Seven great sages) in the first age of Manu, the Manvantara.

== Story ==
=== Origin ===
The sage is said to have emerged from the ear of Brahma in the Bhagavata Purana.

=== Children ===
The Ramayana describes Pulastya's wedding to Manini, and the birth of his son, Vishrava. Once, Pulastya was engaged in austerities in the ashrama of Trinabindu, on the slopes of Mount Meru. Even as he was engaged in a penance in solitude, he was disturbed by a number of youthful maidens, the daughters of other sages, naga maidens, as well as apsaras. They played their musical instruments and danced, seeking to divert his attention. Enraged, Pulastya declared that she among them who fell under his gaze would instantly get impregnated. Terrified of the Brahmin's curse, the girls vanished. During this moment, Manini, the daughter of Trinabindu, who had not been present when the curse was invoked, wandered near the sage, searching for her friends. She found herself pregnant, and rushed to report her condition to her father. The sage Trinabindu requested Pulastya to marry his daughter, and the latter agreed, and so the two lived together in the ashrama. Pleased with his wife's virtuous conduct, Pulastya declared that their child would inherit her virtue, and would be named Vishrava.

Vishrava went on to have two wives: one was Kaikesi who gave birth to Ravana, Shurpanakha, Kumbhakarna, and Vibhishana; and another was Ilavida, and had a son named Kubera.

Pulastya also becomes the father of Agastya.

=== Meeting Bhishma ===
Once, Bhishma lived near the sacred source of the river Ganga, called Gaṅgādvāra. Pulastya makes his presence known before Bhishma, pleased by his austerities. Bhishma offers libations of water and pays his respects to the sage. Pleased, Pulastya instructs Bhishma regarding the path of dharma, which itself had been taught to him by Brahma. In the text Pashupati Purana, the sage Pulastya narrated the story of the purana to Bhishma.

=== Narrator ===
He serves as the medium through which some of the Puranas were communicated to the mankind. He received the Vishnu Purana from Brahma, and communicated it to Parashara, who made it known to mankind.

Pulastya responds to the questions of Narada in the Vamana Purana by reciting legends.

=== Ramakien ===
In Thai National epic Ramakien, Pulastya is called Latsatian. He was the second king of Lanka and the paternal grandfather of Thotsakan.

== Archaeology ==
The partially excavated ancient archaeological mounds of Theh Polar in Kaithal district of Haryana in India is associated with Pulastya.

Certain sources claim that the famous granite statue of a king in Polonnaruwa, Sri Lanka, which was first thought to be of King Parakramabahu the Great, might actually be the Pulastya Rishi. This idea was later proven to be false by Prof. Senarath Paranawithana. Apart from this, no other statues, carvings, paintings or friezes of Pulastya Rishi have been found on the island (Sri Lanka).

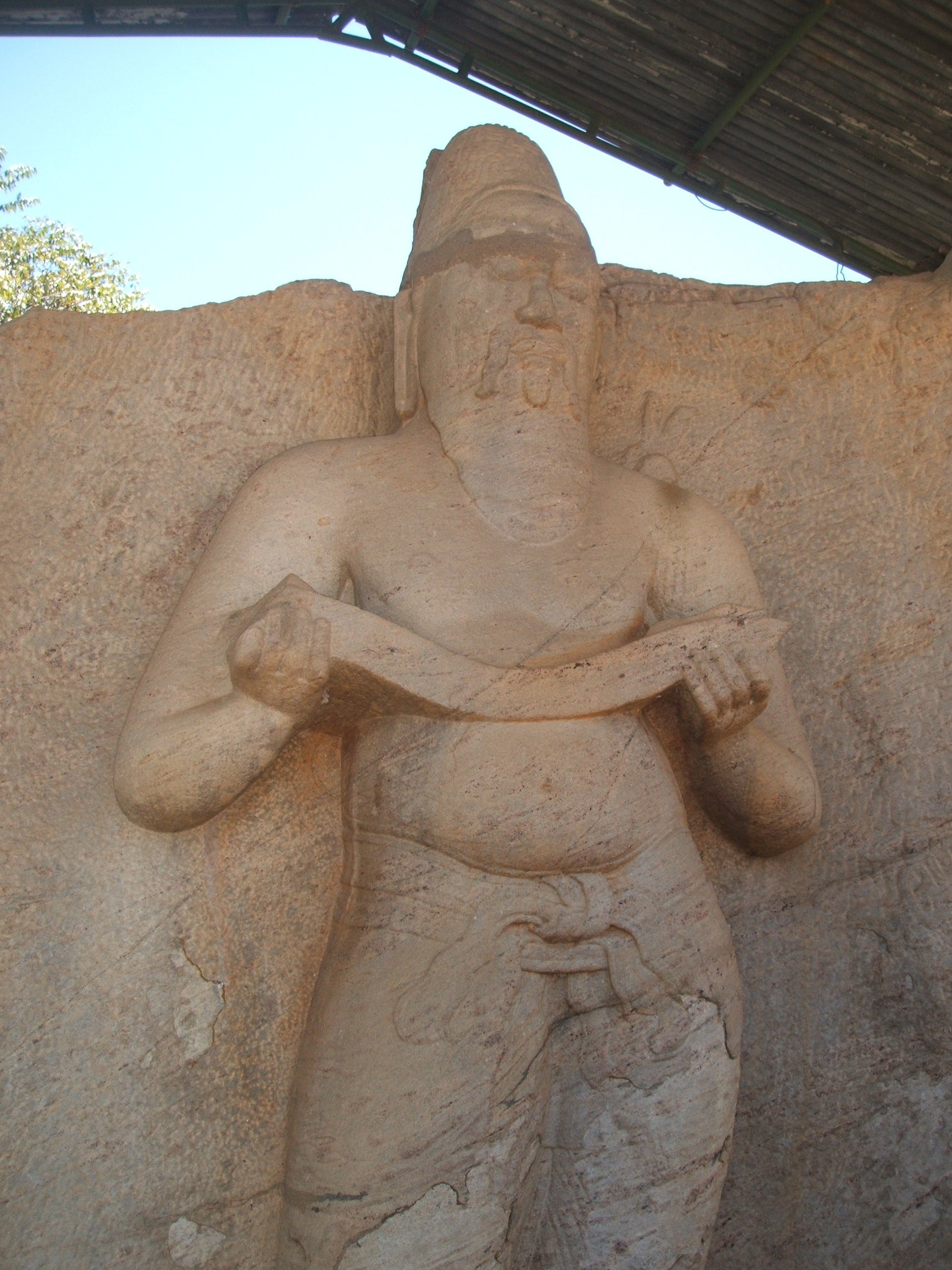
King Parakramabahu the Great statue

However, the city where Parakramabahu reigned from was identified as Pulastinagara, in the Sinhalese chronicles.

== See also ==
- Theh Polar
- 48 kos parikrama
- Rishi
- Vedic period
- Pulastya Raj Chhakara
