= Purochana =

Mahabharata character

- Affiliation: Kauravas
- Texts: Mahabharata

Purochana (Sanskrit: पुरोचन) is a character who is an architect in the kingdom of Hastinapur, and one of Duryodhana's trusted aides in the Indian epic Mahabharata. He was also a minister under the Kauravas.

He is better known as the individual who created the Lakshagriha (palace of lac) under the orders of Duryodhana and his evil mentor, Shakuni. Purochana himself perished in the fire meant to kill the Pandavas. In his previous life, he had been born as Prahasta, who was a powerful rakshasa warrior, and chief commander of Ravana's army of Lanka. In both his births, he has been the minister of antagonistic monarchs.
