= Kabandha =

Demon in Hindu mythology

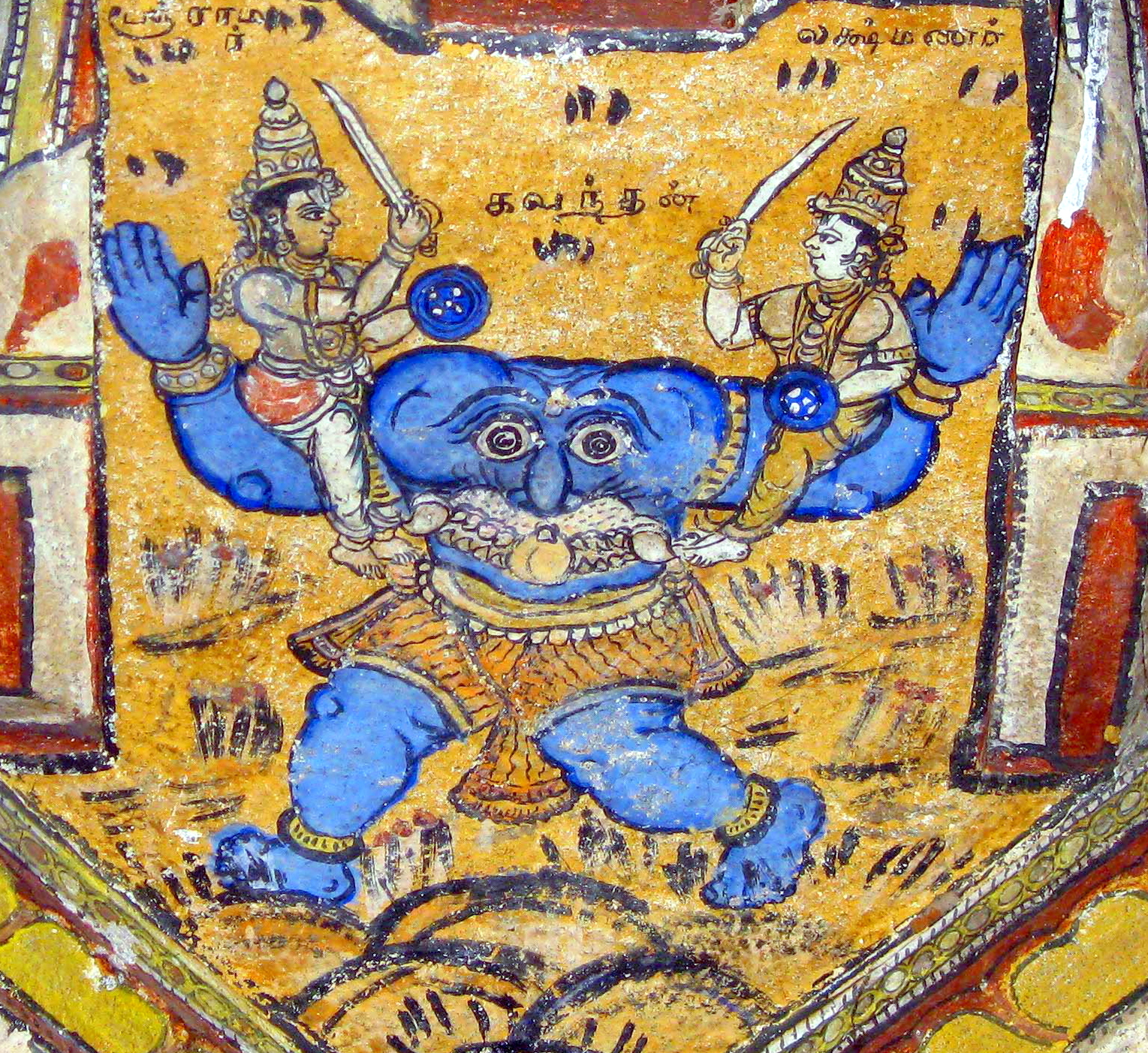
Rama and Lakshmana seated on Kabandha's arms, about to sever them. Kabandha is depicted with a big mouth on his stomach and no head or neck; though depicted with two eyes, the Ramayana describes him as one-eyed. (Painting on the ceiling of Kodandaramaswamy Temple, Ayodhyapatinam near Salem, probably 16th-century.)

In Hinduism, Kabandha (कबन्ध, Kabandha, lit. "headless torso") is a Rakshasa (demon) who is killed and freed from a curse by the god Rama – an Avatar of Vishnu – and his brother Lakshmana. Kabandha's legend appears in the Hindu epics Ramayana and Mahabharata, as well as in later Ramayana adaptations.

Kabandha was a gandharva (celestial musician) named Vishvavasu or Danu, who was cursed and made into an ugly, carnivorous demon by a sage named Sthulshira. In an encounter with Rama and Lakshmana, the brothers sever his arms and proceed to cremate his corpse. Upon his death, Kabandha resumes his Gandharva form and directs Rama to the Rishyamukha mountain, where the exiled monkey-chief Sugriva is hiding. Kabandha advises Rama to form an alliance with Sugriva, who would be of assistance in the search for Rama's wife Sita, who had been kidnapped by Ravana, the demon-king of Lanka. Following Kabandha's advice, Rama befriends Sugriva and rescues Sita with his help.

== Literary sources ==
The most detailed account of Kabandha appears in the third book, Aranya kanda, of the epic Ramayana, Sargas (cantos) 69-73. However, Kabandha first appears in canto one of the first book Bala kanda of the Ramayana, in which the entire story is summarized.

The account of Kabandha also appears in the Ramopakhyana – the retelling of Rama's story in the Aranya Parva – the third book of the Mahabharata, and its appendix Harivamsa, as well as in later adaptations of the Ramayana such as Kalidasa's Raghuvamsa (composed between 4th to 6th century CE), Bhatti's 7th century work Bhattikavya, Bhavabhuti's 8th century play Mahaviracharita, Murari Mishra's 10th century drama Anargharaghava, Kamban's 12th century book Kamba Ramayana, Adhyatma Ramayana (chapter 9 of Aranya kanda, dated between late 14th to early 15th century) from Brahmanda Purana and Tulsidas's 16th century work Ramacharitamanas.

== Early life and curse ==
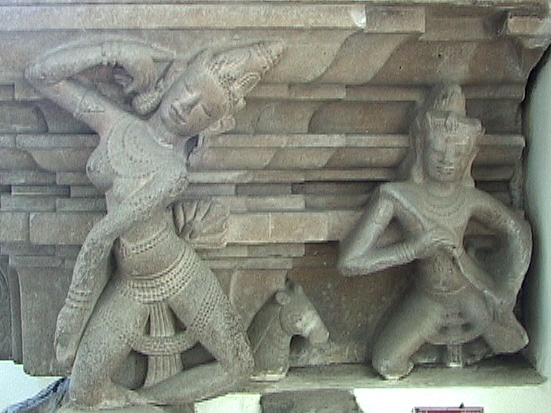
Kabandha was born as a Gandharva – a celestial musician (right) here pictured with an Apsara, celestial dancer. (10th-century Cham "Dancers' Pedestal" of the Tra Kieu style.)

The Ramayana narrates that Kabandha was born as a gandharva (celestial musician) named Vishvavasu. He was the son of the Gandharva Sri Vishvavasu or Sri and was also known as Danu (दनु). Vishvavasu performed penance and got the boon of immortality from the creator-god Brahma. He became arrogant due to his boon and attacked Indra, the god-king of heaven. Indra used his celestial weapon the Vajra (thunderbolt) and drove Vishvavasu's head and thighs into his body. Vishvavasu pleaded that he be given a way to find and eat food. Upon Vishvavasu's beseeching, Indra gave him two long arms and a mouth on his belly. Indra also decreed that Kabandha would regain his original form when Rama severs his arms.

The Ramayana further adds: Kabandha spent his days near the hermitage of the sage Matanga in the Krauncha forest. There, he spent his time scaring sages. Once, Kabandha attacked the sage Stulashira, who cursed him to remain in his hideous form for eternity. Upon Kabandha's pleading, the sage reduced his curse and said that Kabandha would be freed of his form, once Rama and Lakshmana sever his arms. So Kabandha waited in that forest for Rama's arrival. Growse suspected the tale to be a later interpolation arguing that it does not appear in all versions/translations of the original Ramayana.

The Adhyatma Ramayana tells that Kabandha (the name Vishvavasu is not used) was a Gandharva chief, who was blessed by Brahma with immortality. He was "drunk with the wine of youth and beauty" and used to roam the universe's enchanting beautiful maidens. Once, he laughed at the sage Ashtavakra ("one who was eight deformities"), who cursed him to become a Rakshasa, though the sage assured him that Rama would free him of the curse. Still arrogant, Kabandha once chased Indra. The rest of the Indra episode mirrors the Ramayana telling.

The Mahabharata tells that Kabandha was a Gandharva named Vishvavasu in his previous life and was cursed by Brahma to be born "from a Rakshasa womb". The Mahavira-Charita calls Kabandha's real form Danu, son of Sri. The Bhattikavya does not explicitly name Kabandha. He is introduced as "a dreadful demon that was always hungry and being endowed with long arms". Later, he is identified as Sri's son, who was cursed by an ascetic. The Ramacharitamanas tells that Kabandha was cursed by the sage Durvasa, who is known for his hot temper in Hindu mythology.

== Etymology and description of the demonic form ==
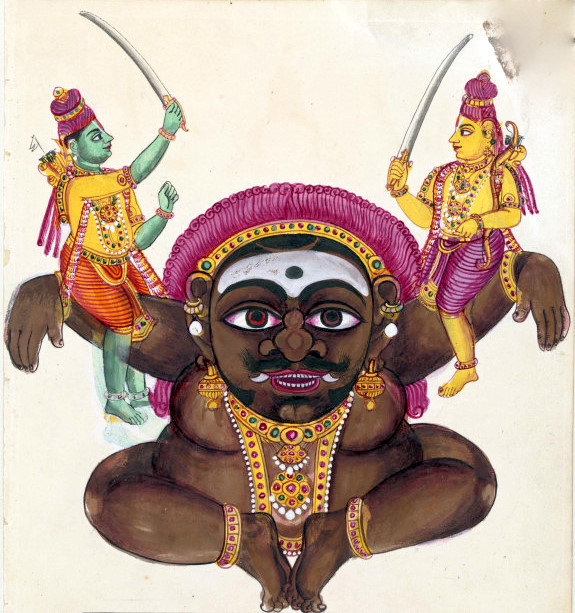
Rama (left) and Lakshamana seated on the arms of Kabandha, about to sever his arms, a 19th-century painting from Tiruchchirappalli.

The Mahabharata describes him thus: Kabandha was "as big as a mountain, dark as a black cloud, with pointed hairs all over his body and looked fierce with a voice as loud as thunder. He had an eye on his stomach, round and yellow, emitting a glare like a fire-flame. Looking wicked he thrust his big tongue out of his huge mouth licking the sides." The Ramayana presents a similar description of Kabandha. Kabandha had a broad chest and was without a head or neck. He had only one eye on his chest and a mouth on his belly. He used his long arms to draw his prey closer. Kabandha is often depicted as a tree.

Since Vishvavasu now did not have a head, but just two arms and a mouth on his stomach, he came to be known as the Rakshasa (demon) Kabandha, the "headless torso". The word Kabandha is often used to describe a large big-bellied barrel or a headless trunk, shaped like a barrel, which retains its vitality.

Adhyatma Ramayana tells that Kabandha was a fierce cannibal and his arms were eight miles long. His huge face – which had no eyes or ears – was at his chest. He had no head or legs.

== Encounter with Rama ==
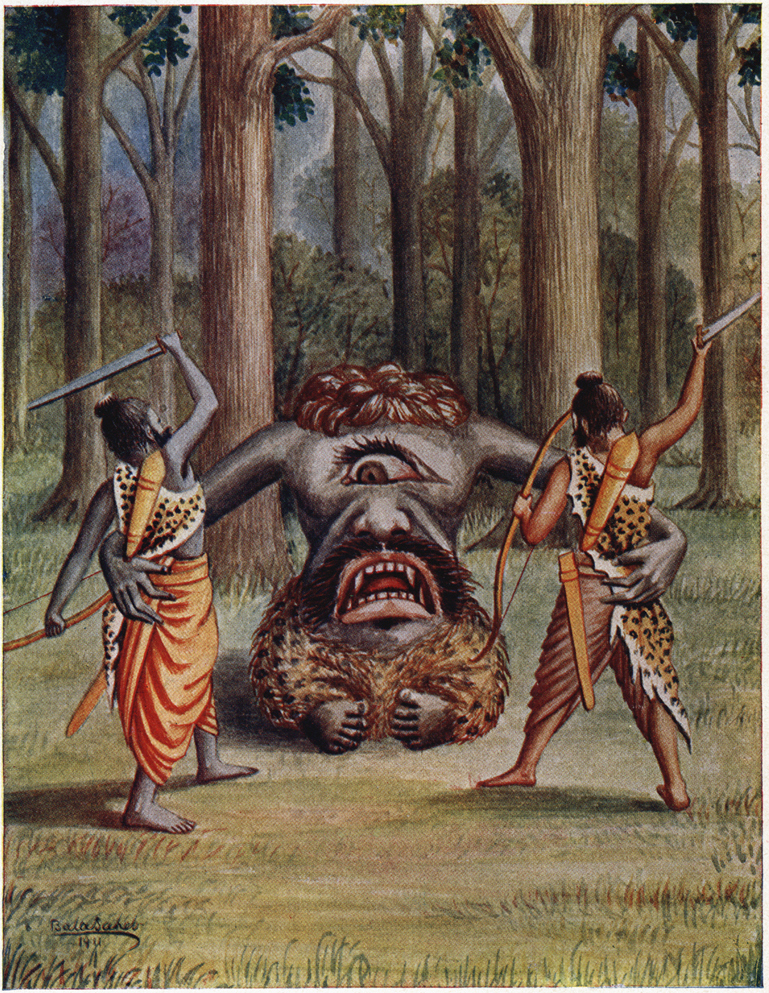
The exiled princes Rama and Lakshamana were caught by Kabandha, whose arms they severed.

The Ramayana narrates: Rama, his consort Sita and his brother Lakshmana were exiled to the forest for a 14-year period. While in the forest, Sita was kidnapped by the demon-king Ravana. Rama was informed of Sita's fate by the dying vulture Jatayu, who had been mortally wounded in trying to save her. Searching for Sita, Rama and Lakshmana reached the Krauncha forest, where Kabandha dwelt.

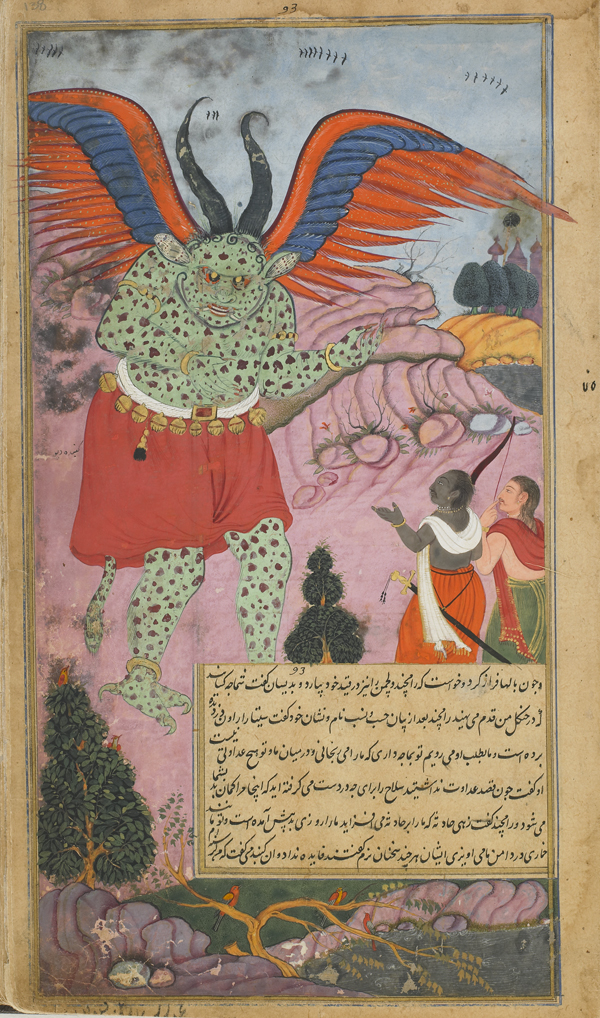
Kabandha tells Rama and Laksmana how he came to have his hideous form

Suddenly, Kabandha appeared before them. The demon blocked the path of the brothers, who tried to escape by taking a different route, but was finally caught by Kabandha. The demon grabbed Rama in his right arm and Lakshmana in his left. Finding themselves helpless in Kabandha's clutches, Lakshmana appeals to Rama to escape and find Sita, leaving him behind as a sacrifice to the demon. Rama consoled him. Kabandha declared that he was extremely hungry and asked them who they were who had come to sate his hunger. At this time, Lakshmana realized that the strength of the demon lay in his hands and suggested that they cut off the demon's hands. Annoyed by the brothers' conversation, Kabandha decided to eat them at once and drew them closer to his mouth. The brothers drew their swords and quickly cut off the arms of the demon, who fell down with a mighty roar.

The fallen Kabandha again asked for the names of his vanquishers. Lakshmana introduced himself and Rama and asked the demon who he was. Kabandha narrated his story to the brothers and declared that he recognized Rama by the very fact that Rama had severed his arms. Kabandha requested that Rama perform his cremation rites, offered him what information he could, and died.

Rama attacks the demon Kabandha, Malwa, ca 1640 CE

While other adaptations tell a tale about the encounter similar to Ramayana, Mahavira-Charita is a notable exception. A woman called Shramana is caught in the clutches of Kabandha and calls for help. While roaming in the Dandaka forest, Rama hears her call and sends Lakshmana to check. Lakshmana kills Kabandha and leads Shramana to Rama. Shramana turns out to be a messenger of Vibhishana (Bibhishana) – brother of Ravana – who has joined forces with Sugriva against Ravana. Anargharaghava mirrors the Mahavira-Charita, replacing Shramana with Guha, a forest chief who leads them to Sugriva.

== Counsel to Rama ==
The Ramayana narrates: the brothers burnt Kabandha's corpse on a funeral pyre. As the pyre was lit, Kabandha's demon form melted and from the flames Vishvavasu rose up in the air in his celestial form, dressed in spotless garments and finery as a chariot from heaven appears to get him. Vishvavasu told the brothers that to fight calamity there are six ways, one of which to nurture a friendship with someone, who is in trouble. He advised the brothers to find the monkey (vanara) king Sugriva, who would guide them in the quest for Sita. Vishvavasu informed Rama that Sugriva was driven out of his kingdom by his own brother Vali and that Rama should help Sugriva regain his kingdom. The deposed Sugriva dwelt at Rsyamukha hill. Vishvavasu then described in detail the route to Rsyamukha hill. He advised Rama to travel in the western direction till he reached the Pampa lake in the region called Matangavana where sage Matanga's hermitage once stood. Ram would meet vanaras at this lake and also sage Matanga's aged female disciple Shabari, who is waiting for him and after Rama's visit, would ascend to heaven. To east of Matangavana is the Rsyamukha hill, which has an arduous path up. Kabandha revealed that one who ascends to the top of this hill, his dreams come true. Kabandha also assured Rama that his sorrows would end after reaching this hill, where Sugriva dwelt in a cave on the side on the hill. Kabandha then disappears.

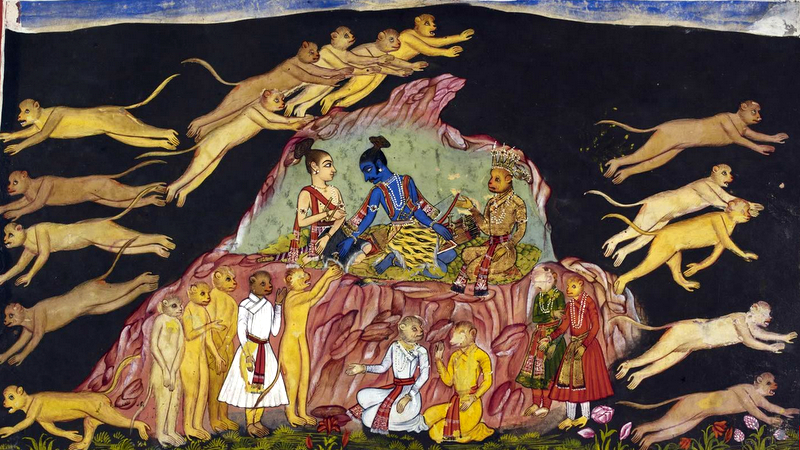
As per the advice of Kabandha, Rama forms an alliance with Sugriva. Rama seated with Sugriva as the vanaras look for Sita in all directions. (17th-century painting from manuscripts commissioned by Rana Jagat Singh.)

The Mahabharata corroborates the Ramayana account. Vishvavasu tells Rama to seek the help of Sugriva, who would know where Ravana stays. Kabandha also assured Rama that he would definitely meet Sita again. In the Mahavira-Charita, the divine person that leaves the funeral pyre informs Rama that he is Danu and a curse had turned him in a demon, who was manipulated by Malyavan – Ravana's chief adviser – to create havoc in the region. He expresses his gratitude to Rama and cautions him that Malyavan has also set Vali against him.

In Bhattikavya, Jatayu dies in the arms of Rama without revealing that Sita is in the clutches of Ravana. After his arms are chopped, the unnamed demon – identified with Kabandha – falls and starts his counsel. The funeral pyre scene is dropped here. The demon tells Rama that Ravana abducted Sita and has taken her to Lanka. He advises Rama to form an alliance with Sugriva, without which Ravana will not be overcome. He advises Rama to negotiate a deal with Sugriva as per which Rama will kill Vali and end Sugriva's sorrows and in return, Sugriva would mobilize his forces to defeat Ravana. The demon praises Rama, who purified the demon by his sword. The demon urges Rama to believe him as he is telling the truth. At last, the demon transforms into a radiant divine being as he was telling the truth and plunges into the sky.

Kamba Ramayana concurs with the Ramayana account about the counsel, but adds a panegyric on Rama by the celestial Danu. Danu exalts Rama as an incarnation of Vishnu and even compares him to baby Krishna, another incarnation of Vishnu. Raghuvamsa, which is a summary of the lives of ancestors of Rama and his own, does not mention the details of the killing of Kabandha, however, it acknowledges the counsel. In a passing reference, it notes: "At the advice of Kabandha, who by death escaped from curse, there grew up a friendship between Rama and the monkey-chief (Sugriva)".

Rama and Lakshmana took Kabandha's advice and reached Pampa Lake. There, as per Kabandha's prophecy, they met Shabari and then Sugriva. An alliance with Sugriva would finally help Rama defeat Ravana and save Sita.

The Adhyatma Ramayana, the Mahavira-charita, the Anargharaghava and the Ramacharitamanas do not discuss the counsel at all and credit Shabari or Shramana or Guha as the one who leads Rama to Sugriva. In the Adhyatma Ramayana, Kabandha appears from the pyre as a divine being and reveals his true identity as a cursed Gandharva. He further extols Rama in a hymn stating that various worlds and deities are embedded in parts of his body and Rama is the Supreme being and then disappears.

== See also ==
- Blemmyes (legendary creatures)
- Xing Tian
- Humbaba
