= List of Yakshas =

List of Indian mythological creatures

Below is a non-exhaustive list of Yakshas, a race of anthropomorphic spirits in Indian mythology. While many are malevolent, some are benevolent protectors of Dharma.

Yakshas are male while Yakshis or Yakshinis are female.

Religious traditions that feature these entries are sorted using the following key:

- ॐ - Hinduism
- ☸ - Buddhism
- 卐 - Jainism

== List in alphabetical order ==
=== A ===
- Ambikā – Guardian yakshini of Neminātha Tirthankara 卐
- Anila – One of the Twelve Heavenly Generals of Bhaisajyaguru Buddha ☸
- Antila – One of the Twelve Heavenly Generals of Bhaisajyaguru Buddha ☸

=== B ===
- Bahuputrikā – One of Maṇibhadra's queens ॐ

=== C ===
- Caundhula – One of the Twelve Heavenly Generals of Bhaisajyaguru Buddha ☸
- Cakreśvarī – Guardian yakshini of Rishabhanatha Tirthankara and tutelary goddess of the Sarawagi Jains 卐
- Cidāla – One of the Twelve Heavenly Generals of Bhaisajyaguru Buddha ☸

=== D ===
- Dharanendra – Guardian yaksha of Pārśvanātha Tirthankara and tutelary goddess of the Sarawagi Jains 卐

=== H ===
- Hārītī – Once malevolent and turned into a Buddhist protector of children ☸
- Harikeśa – Pūrṇabhadra's son and a devotee of Śiva ॐ

=== I ===
- Indala – One of the Twelve Heavenly Generals of Bhaisajyaguru Buddha ☸

=== J ===
- Jvālāmālinī – Guardian yakshini of Chandraprabha Tirthankara 卐

=== K ===
- Kiṃbhīra – One of the Twelve Heavenly Generals of Bhaisajyaguru Buddha ☸
- Kubera – King of the yakshas and god of wealth ॐ☸卐

=== M ===
- Mahāla – One of the Twelve Heavenly Generals of Bhaisajyaguru Buddha ☸
- Makhādeva – A tree-dweller converted by the Buddha when he was still a bodhisattva ☸
- Maṇibhadra – A popular figure in Hinduism, Buddhism and Jainism ॐ☸卐
- Mānuṣyayakṣa – One of thirteen yakshas given in the Jain Tattvārtha Bhāṣya 卐
- Mārīca – Cursed to become a rakshasa by the sage Agastya ॐ
- Mekhila – One of the Twelve Heavenly Generals of Bhaisajyaguru Buddha ☸

=== N ===
- Nalakūvara ॐ☸

=== P ===
- Padmāvatī – Guardian yakshini of Pārśvanātha Tirthankara 卐
- Pañcika – Commander-in-chief of Vaiśravaṇa's army and others. Consort of Hārītī ☸
- Pāyila – One of the Twelve Heavenly Generals of Bhaisajyaguru Buddha ☸
- Pūrṇabhadra – Younger brother of Maṇibhadra ॐ☸卐

=== R ===
- Rūpayakṣa – One of thirteen yakshas given in the Jain Tattvārtha Bhāṣya 卐

=== T ===
- Tāṭakā – Cursed to become a rakshasa by the sage Agastya ॐ

=== S ===
- Śāli – A yaksha turned into a lion ॐ
- Saṇṭhila – One of the Twelve Heavenly Generals of Bhaisajyaguru Buddha ☸
- Saudāsa – Aṅgulimāla in a previous life ॐ☸
- Sthūṇa – A devotee of Kubera, who exchanges his identity with Shikhandin ॐ
- Sthuṇākarṇa – Turns Śikhaṇḍī into a male ॐ
- Suketu – A yaksha King in the Ramayana ॐ
- Sulpani – Known to have troubled Mahavira during ascetic practices 卐

=== V ===
- Vajra – One of the Twelve Heavenly Generals of Bhaisajyaguru Buddha ☸
- Vajrapāṇi – Guardian of the Buddha and bodhisattvas ☸
- Vikala – One of the Twelve Heavenly Generals of Bhaisajyaguru Buddha ☸

=== Y ===
- Yama – Appears as a yaksha in the Yaksha Prashna story ॐ
