= Prahasta =

Ramayana character

- Ramayana character
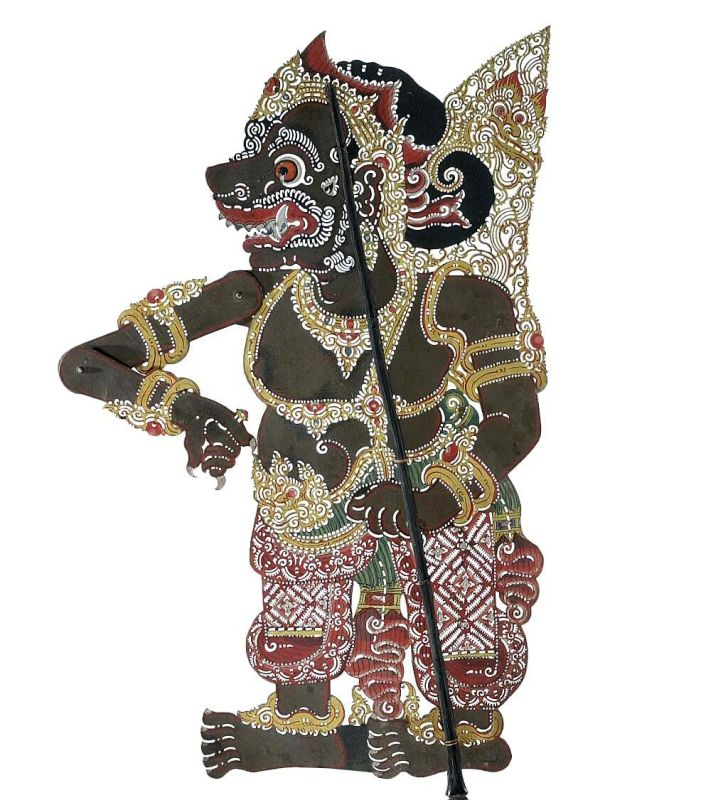

In-universe information
- Family: Father: Sumali (Ravana in Ramcharitmanas); Mother: Ketumati (Mandodari in Ramcharitmanas
- Children: Jambumali

In the Hindu epic, the Ramayana, Prahasta (Sanskrit: प्रहस्त, IAST: prahasta, lit. he who has extended hands) was a powerful rakshasa warrior. He was the chief commander of Ravana's army of Lanka. He was the son of Sumali and Ketumathi. In Ramcharitmanas, he was Ravana's and Mandodari's virtuous son who withdraws from the war. In his next birth, Prahasta was reborn as Purochana in the Mahabharata as Duryodhana's trusted aide and was the man responsible for the Lakshagraha incident.

== Legend ==
Prahasta was one of the ten sons of Sumali and Ketumati. He also had four sisters. One of them was Ravana's mother Kaikashi.

Prahasta was appointed as the commander-in-chief of Ravana's army. He led Ravana's army in the wars against Yama, Kubera and the Devas, and the Asuras and Daityas, through which Ravana established his sovereignty over the three worlds. He also led the initial Lankan response to the invasion led by Rama, Lakshmana, Sugriva and the Vanara army.

Prahasta killed several important warriors of Sugriva's army and was actually proving to be a real threat to Rama's army. As per one version of the Ramayana, Prahasta was killed by Lakshmana. In another version, Nila hurled a rock at Prahasta that broke his neck and killed him. (Valmiki Ramayana, book 6, canto 58, verses 53,54)

In Ramcharitmanas, he was Ravana's and Mandodari's virtuous son who withdraws from the war. He even asked Ravana to return Sita to Rama, for which he was rebuked.
