= Ilavida =

Ramayana character

- Other names: Idavida, Devavarnini, Lokavati, Lata
- Texts: Puranas, Ramayana

Genealogy
- Parents: Bharadvaja (father) Susheela(mother)
- Spouse: Vishrava
- Children: Kubera

Ilavida or Idavida (Sanskrit: इडविडा, romanized: Iḍaviḍā) is a character in the Ramayana. She is the first wife of the sage Vishrava and the mother of Kubera.

== Legend ==
In the Ramayana, Ilavida is described to be the daughter of the rishi Bharadvaja. Ilavida was given in marriage to the rishi Vishrava and had a son with him, Kubera, who would eventually become the king of Lanka.
