= Sharanga =

Sharanga may refer to:

- Sharanga (Hindu mythology), the bow of the god Vishnu
- Sharanga (urban-type settlement), an urban-type settlement in Nizhny Novgorod Oblast, Russia
