= Shurpanakha =

Sister of Lanka king Ravana in the epic Ramayana

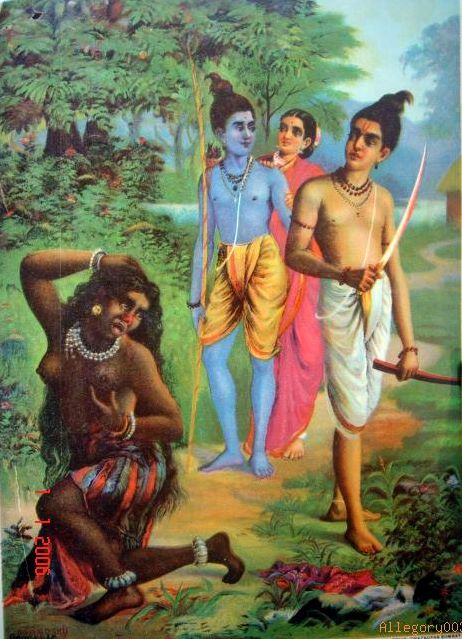
- Depiction of Shurpanakha
- Affiliation: Rakshasi
- Abode: Lanka
- Texts: Ramayana and its versions

Genealogy
- Parents: Vishrava (father); Kaikasi (mother)
- Siblings: Ravana (brother); Vibhishana (brother); Kumbhakarna (brother)
- Spouse: Vidyujjihvā
- Children: Shambhu Kumara (son)

Shurpanakha (Sanskrit: शूर्पणखा, IAST: śūrpaṇakhā, lit. 'she whose fingernails are like winnowing fans'), is a rakshasi (demoness) in Hindu epic. Her legends are mainly narrated in the epic Ramayana and its other versions. She was the sister of Lanka's king, Ravana, and the daughter of the sage Vishrava and the rakshasi Kaikasi. Shurpanakha's role in the original epic is small, yet significant.

== Appearance ==
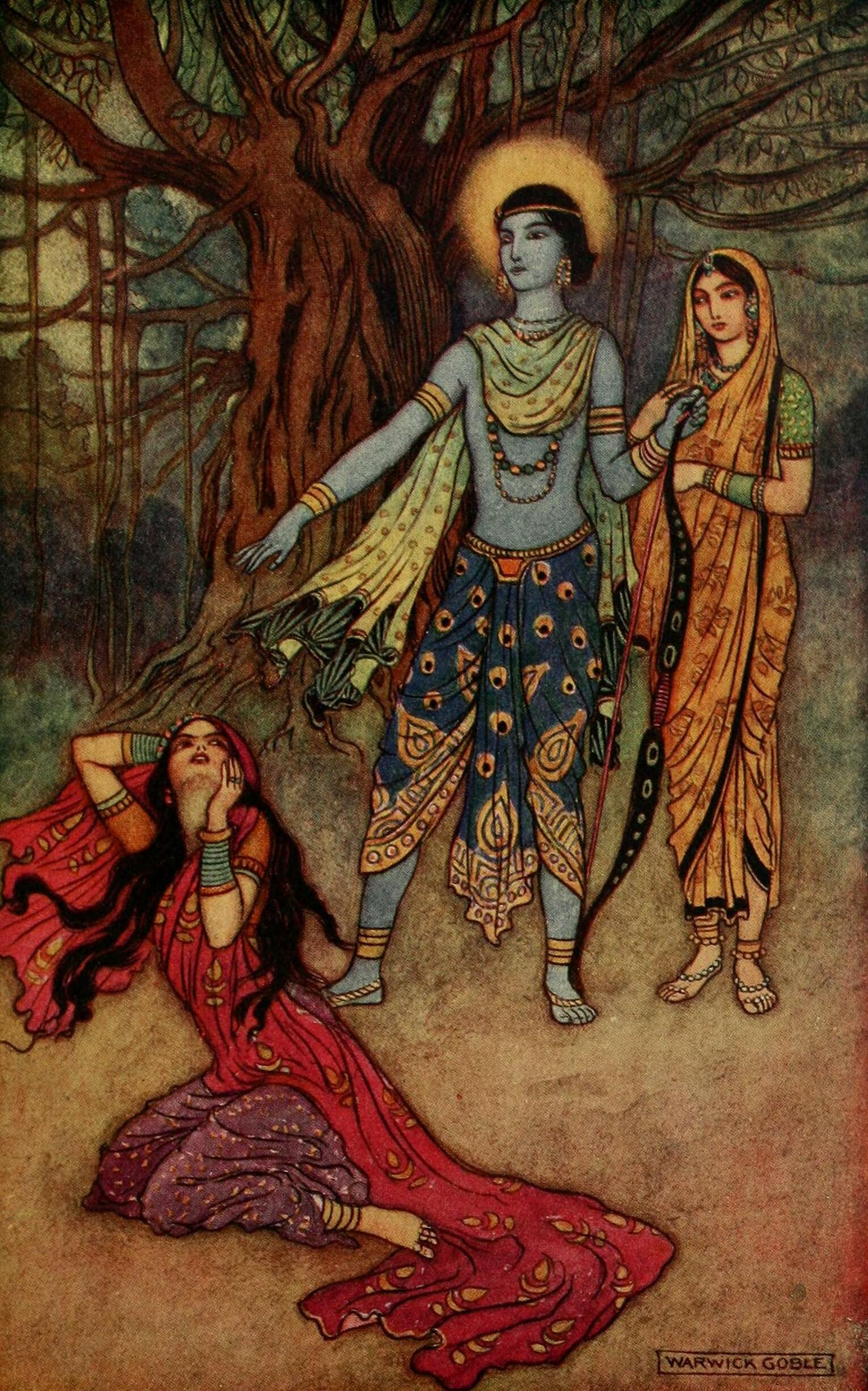
Rama rejects Shurpanakha

Shurpanakha's appearance has drastic differences in the different versions of the epic. Most versions including the Valmiki's Ramayana mention her to be an ugly woman. When Shurpanakha first sees Rama in the forest, Valmiki describes her as facially unpleasant, pot-bellied, wry-eyed, coppery-haired, ugly featured, brassy-voiced, deplorably oldish, a crooked talker, ill-mannered, uncouth and abominable. In contrast, the Kamba Ramayanam describes her as a lovelorn and beautiful woman, attributing her behaviour to loneliness and thus humanising her.

== Marriage and widowhood ==
When Shurpanakha grew up, she secretly married the Danava prince of the Kalkeya Danava clan, Vidyutjihva. Ravana became enraged with Shurpanakha for marrying a Danava. The Danavas were the mortal enemies of Rakshasas. Enraged, Ravana decided to kill both of them. Thus waged a war against Vidyutjihva's army and killed him in a battle. Ravana was about to kill Surpanakha too but Ravana's wife Mandodari saved her. Ravana's brothers Kumbhakarna and Vibhishana also appealed to him to spare Surpanakha's life.

Mandodari asked Surpanakha to roam and search for another husband. Shurpanakha then split her time between Lanka and the woods of Southern India, sometimes living with her forest-dwelling Asura relatives, Khara and Dushana, on Ravana's orders.

== Encounter with Rama, Sita and Lakshmana ==
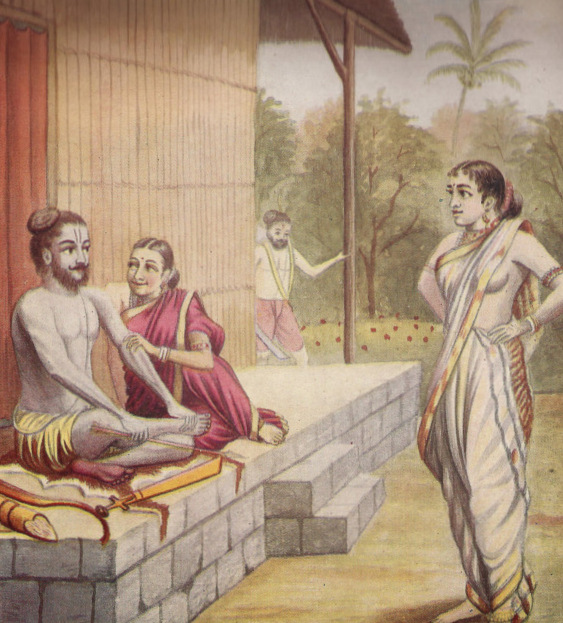
Shurpanakha asks Rama to marry her.

According to Valmiki, she met the exiled Prince Rama of Ayodhya, during one such visit to the Forest of Panchavati, and was instantly smitten by his youthful good looks. She adopted a beautiful form to entice him, but Rama meanwhile kindly rejected her advances, telling her that he was faithful to his wife Sita and thus would never take another wife. Rejected, Shurpanakha then approached his younger brother, Lakshmana, who said that he is only second to Ram and therefore not worthy of her. Infuriated by their dismissals, the humiliated and envious Shurpanakha returned to her demonic form and attacked Sita, but was thwarted by Lakshmana, who cut off her nose.

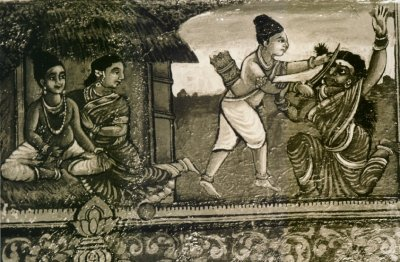
Lakshmana cutting Shurpanakha's nose

Shurpanakha first went to her brother Khara, who sent fourteen Rakshasa warriors to attack Rama, who easily dispatched them. Khara himself then attacked, along with 14,000 soldiers, all of whom were killed except for Akampana, Sumali's son and Kaikesi's brother, who fled to Lanka. She then fled to Ravana's court and spoke to her brother of the disgrace she had suffered. Her brother, hearing of Sita's beauty, decided to kidnap Sita. Akampana too played a key role in instigating Sita's kidnapping by Ravana. Despite opposition from their brother, Vibhishana, Ravana kidnapped Sita, thus triggering the Battle of Lanka.

== In popular culture ==
Shurpanakha was portrayed by Rakul Preet Singh in the 2026 Hindi film, Ramayana: Part 1.

== Sources ==
- Richman, Paula (29 August 1991). "The Mutilation of Surpanakha". Many Ramayanas: The Diversity of a Narrative Tradition in South Asia. University of California Press. ISBN 978-0-520-07589-4.
- Monier-Williams, Monier (1872). A Sanskrit-English Dictionary. Clarendon.
- Ramayana, A condensed prose version of the epic by C. Raja Gopalachari. Published by Bhavan's Book University
- Valmiki. Ramayana: Aranya Kandha
- Valmiki Ramayan by Rajshekhar Basu - Uttarkanda
