= Vishrava =

Sage in Hinduism

Genealogy
- Parents: Pulastya (father), Havirbhu/Manini (mother) (Ramayana)
- Siblings: Agastya
- Consort: Ilavida, Kaikasi, Raka, and Pushpotkata
- Children: Kubera (son) by Ilavida Ravana, Kumbhakarna, Vibhishana (sons); Surpanakha (daughter) by Kaikashi; Trishira, Dushana, Vidyutjiha (sons), Malika and Asalika (daughters) by Raka Mahodara, Prahasta, Mahaparsha, Khara (sons) and Kumbhinashi (daughter) by Pushpotkata

Vishrava (Sanskrit: विश्रवा, lit. 'Renown', IAST: Viśravā), also called Vishravas, is the son of Pulastya, and a powerful rishi (sage), as described in the Hindu epic Ramayana. A scholar par excellence, he earned great powers through the performance of tapasya, which in turn, earned him great name and fame amongst his fellow rishis. He is best known for being the father of the primary antagonist of the Ramayana, Ravana.

== Legend ==
=== Birth ===
The birth of Vishrava is described in the Ramayana. Once, the great sage Pulastya has engaged in austerities in the ashrama of Trinabindu, on the slopes of Mount Meru. Even as he was engaged in a penance in solitude, he was disturbed by a number of youthful maidens, the daughters of other sages, pannagas, as well as apsaras. They played their musical instruments and danced, seeking to divert his attention. Enraged, Pulastya declared that she among them who fell under his gaze would instantly conceive. Terrified of the Brahmin's curse, the girls vanished. During this moment, Manini, the daughter of Trinabindu, who had not been present when the curse was invoked, wandered near the sage, searching for her friends. She found herself pregnant, and rushed to report her condition to her father. The sage Trinabindu requested Pulastya to marry his daughter, and the latter agreed, and so the two lived together in the ashrama. Pleased with his wife's virtuous conduct, Pulastya declared that their child would inherit her virtue, and would be named Vishrava.

=== Children ===
Vishrava grew to become a great sage, devoted to the study of the Vedas, and detached from earthly pleasures. Bharadvaja, in particular, was so impressed with Vishrava, that he gave him his daughter, Ilavida, in marriage. Ilavida bore Vishrava a son, Vaishravana, also called Kubera, the god of wealth, who was subsequently blessed with the rulership of Lanka by Brahma.

A rakshasa named Sumali urged his daughter, Kaikasi, to seek Vishrava as her husband, promising her that their children would rival Kubera. Kaikasi finds Vishrava while he was performing a yajna, and told him of her father's wish for her to wed him. The cognisant Vishrava informed the beautiful maiden that their children, if produced, would be rakshasas, of cruel exploits. Kaikasi prostrated herself before him, seeking children of his disposition. Vishrava agreed to wed her, though he forewarned her that only their last child would inherit his disposition. Accordingly, Kaikasi gives birth to the rakshasas Ravana, Kumbhakarna, and Shurpanakha, and one virtuous rakshasa, Vibhishana.

Vishrava educated Ravana regarding the practices of tapasya, yajna, and the Vedas.

When Ravana claimed Lanka for himself, Vishrava counselled Kubera to accede to his half-brother's demand, to avoid conflict. Obeying his father, Kubera retired to Kailasha, and became a lokapala.
