= Kumbhakarna =

Younger brother of Ravana in the Ramayana

- Depiction of Giant Warrior Kumbhakarna fighting Vanara Army
- Affiliation: Rakshasa
- Texts: Ramayana and its versions

Genealogy
- Parents: Vishrava (father); Kaikasi (mother)
- Siblings: Ravana, Vibhishana (brothers); Shurpanakha (sister)
- Consort: Vajrajvala; Karkati; Taritamala; Aswani
- Children: Kumbha and Nikumbha (from Vajrajvala); Bhimasura (from Karkati); Mulakasura (from Taritamala; Aswanikumbha (from Aswani); Devabhi (Stepson from Karkati and Anuloma)

Kumbhakarna (Sanskrit: कुम्भकर्ण, lit. pot-eared) is a powerful rakshasa and younger brother of Ravana from the Hindu epic Ramayana. He is said to have slaughtered 8,000 vanaras over the course of Rama's mission to rescue Sita. Kumbhakarna is known to sleep for six months at a time due to a boon he received from Brahma.

== Life ==
=== Origin ===
In the Bhagavata Purana, Kumbhakarna is said to be the incarnation of the gatekeeper deity Vijaya. Vijaya, along with his brother and fellow gatekeeper Jaya, was punished by the Four Kumaras for impiety while they guarded the sacred realm of Vishnu. Vijaya was initially sentenced to mortality, but after appealing to Vishnu, their sentences were reduced to just three lifetimes, allowing them to return to Vaikuntha. While his brother Jaya became Ravana, Vijaya became Kumbhakarna during their second of three incarnations on Earth.

=== Family ===
Kumbhakarna's parents are Vishrava, a prominent sage, and Kaikasi. His siblings are Ravana, who is the eldest of Kaikasi's children, Shurpanakha, his younger sister, and Vibhishana, the youngest of the siblings.

He has two sons, Kumbha and Nikumbha, with his wife Vajrajwala, the daughter of Bali and granddaughter of Virochana, who also fought in the war against Rama and was killed.

=== Personality ===
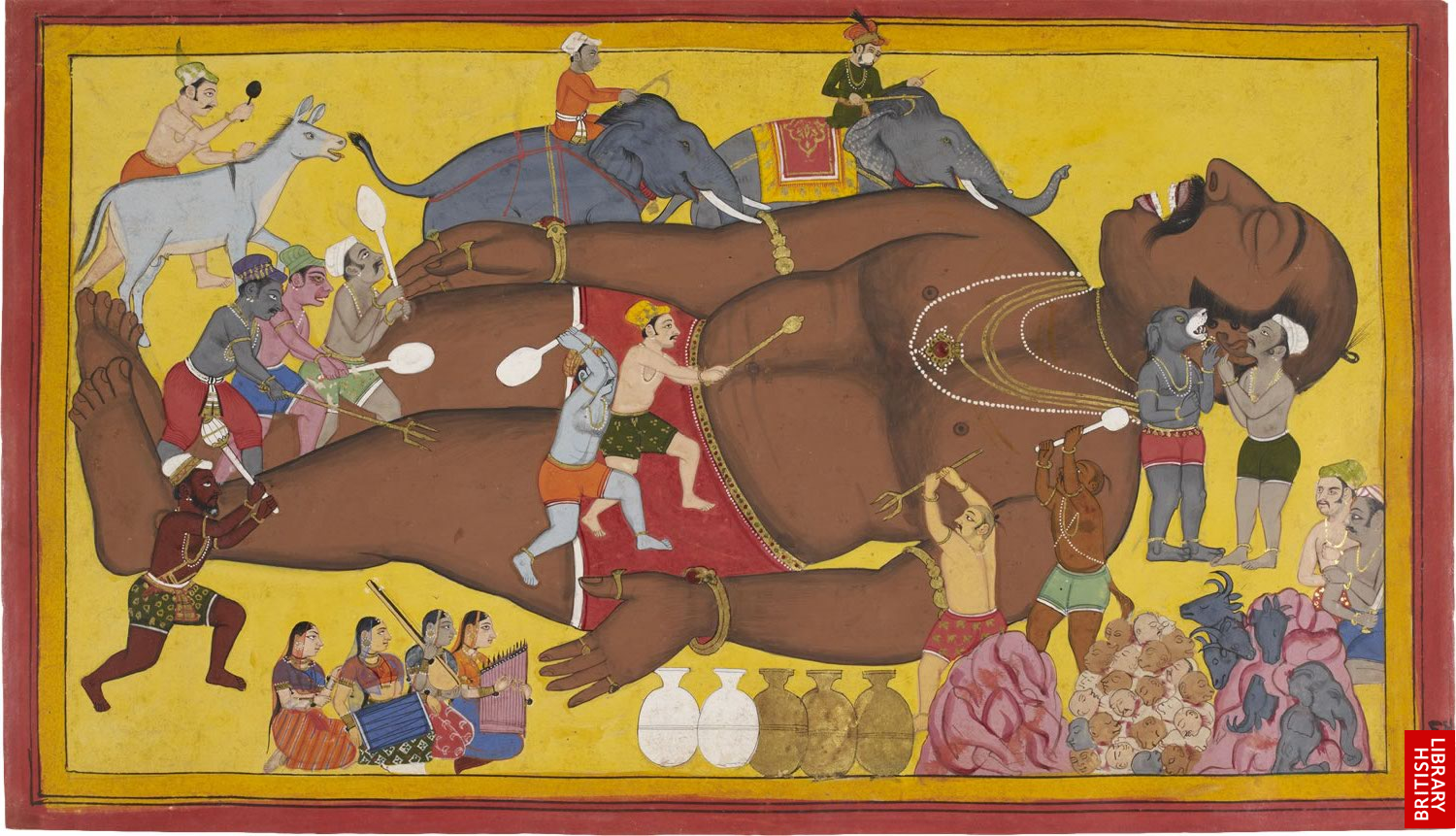
The demons try to rouse the giant Kumbhakarna by hitting him with weapons and clubs and shouting in his ear, 17th century, British Museum

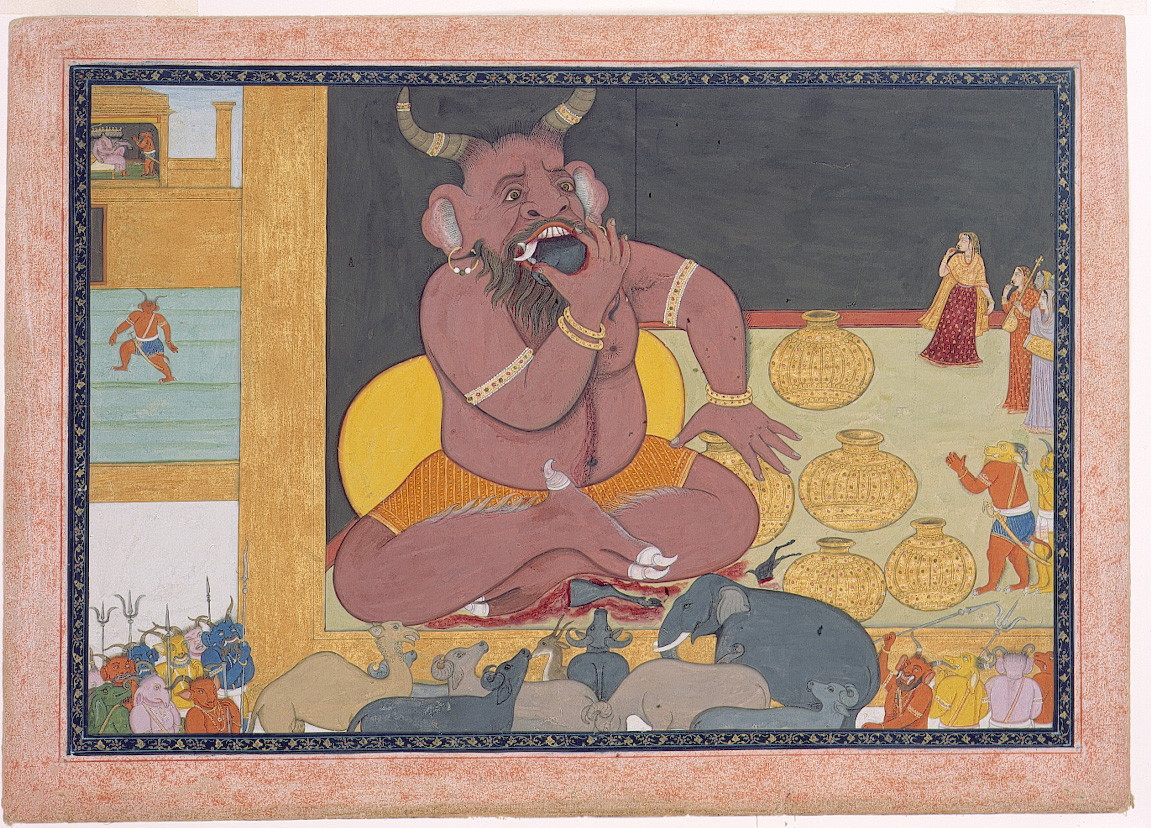
Kumbhakarna finally wakes up and eats

Kumbhakarna is portrayed as a loyal, powerful, and fearless character who fought to defend his brother, Ravana, and land out of obligation and affection. He had a great appetite and slept for six months at a time.

=== Boon from Brahma ===
Early in his life, Kumbhakarna was devoted to austerities. He performed austerities for 10,000 years, which consisted of sitting among five fires during the summer, remaining submerged in water in the winter, and standing in the 'heroic pose' in the rain during the rainy season.

Pleased with his austerities, Brahma was prepared to grant Kumbhakarna a boon, similar to the boons he granted to Ravana and Vibhishana, Kumbhakarna's brothers. However, at this time, all the gods pleaded with Brahma to not grant a boon to Kumbhakarna, citing his evil mind and terrorizing of the three worlds.

However, since Brahma had already offered to grant a boon, he called upon Saraswati, the goddess of speech, who entered Kumbhakarna's mouth to speak on his behalf. Brahma then told Kumbhakarna to ask for his boon, who mistakenly asked for sleep since his speech was controlled by Saraswari. In some accounts, it is noted that instead of asking for Indrāsana (the throne of Indra), he asked for Nidrāsana (a bed for sleeping). It is also said that he intended to ask for Nirdevatvam (annihilation of the devas) and instead asked for Nidravatvam (sleep).

In some accounts, Kumbhakarna was cursed by Brahma. Vibhishana narrated that Kumbhakarna had been born with immense strength, having subdued both Indra and Yama, striking the former in the chest with the broken tusk of Airavata. At the bequest of Indra, Brahma cursed the rakshasa to "sleep like he is dead". On Ravana's request, he commuted the curse to have the rakshasa sleep for six months at a time, and wake up for other six months to wreak havoc and devour to his heart's content.

== In the war ==
In defense of his kingdom, Ravana charged into battle and was humiliated by Rama and his army after underestimating his enemy. He decided he needed the help of his brother Kumbhakarna, who woke up only after 1,000 elephants walked over him.

When informed of Ravana's war with Rama, Kumbhakarna tried to convince Ravana that what he was doing was wrong, that Rama is the avatar of Vishnu, and that Sita is an avatar of Lakshmi. However, Ravana was deaf to these words and Kumbhakarna chose to fight in the battle due to loyalty and affection for his brother and homeland. He joined the battle and devastated Rama's army. After a battle against Hanuman and Sugriva, he knocked the latter unconscious and took him prisoner.

Lakshmana and Kumbhakarna dueled for a long period, leaving both of them exhausted. In his battle against Rama, Kumbhakarna had one arm cut off by the Vayuastra and the other mutilated by the Indrastra. Still, he raged towards Rama, opening his mouth to swallow him whole, and was met with a volley of arrows. In the Kamba Ramayanam, Kumbhakarna acknowledges the divinity of Rama, but informs him of his dharma to fight for his brother, and only urges the prince to keep Vibhishana safe from harm. With his desire granted, he charged against Rama with his feet severed by crescent arrows. He was slain only when the Indrastra was deployed by Rama. Kumbakarna's head was decapitated, and is described to have smashed several buildings and fortifications before descending towards the sea. When Ravana heard of his brother's death, he fainted and later proclaimed that he was doomed.

== In popular culture ==
In 2026, Kumbhkarna was portrayed by Faisal Malik in the film, Ramayana: Part 1.

== See also ==
- Ravana
- Ramayana
- Rama
- Sita
- Rakshasa

== Literature ==
- "Kumbhakarna" in M.M.S. Shastri Chitrao, Bharatavarshiya Prachin Charitrakosha (Dictionary of Ancient Indian Biography, in Hindi), Pune 1964, pp. 149–151
