= Sugriva =

Vanara king and Rama's companion in Ramayana

- Ramayana character
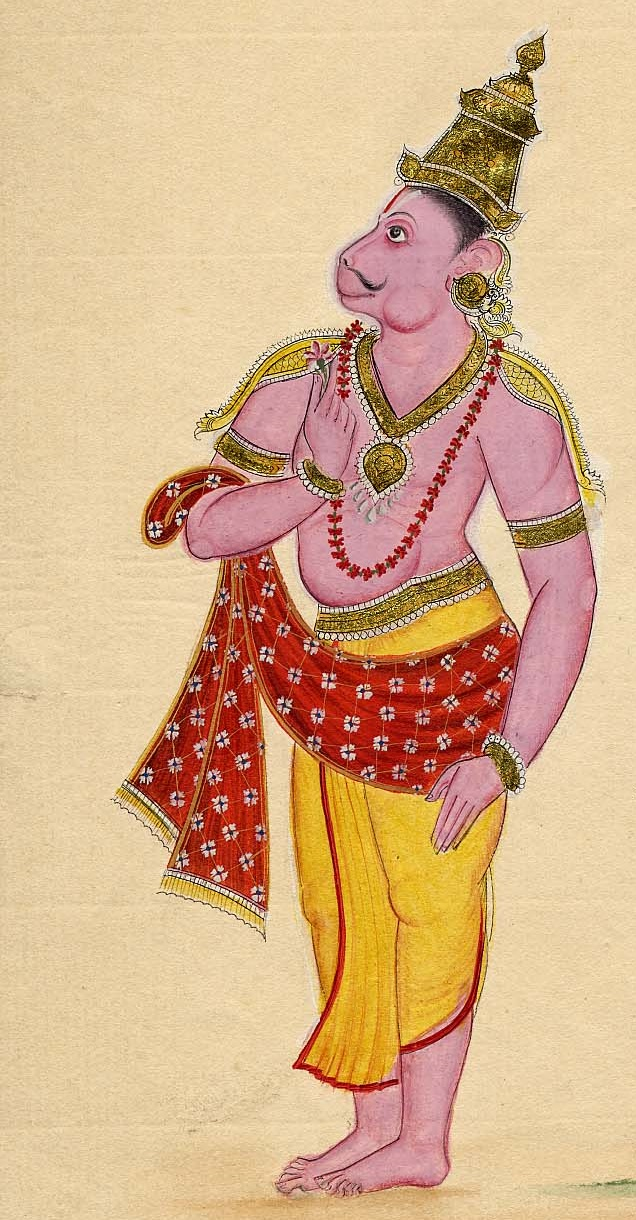
- Sugriva

In-universe information
- Race: Vanara
- Family: Surya (spiritual father), Aruni (Riksharaja)(mother)
- Spouse: Rumā
- Children: Trinavati
- Relatives: Vali (brother), Hanuman (uncle) and Angada (nephew)
- Home: Kishkindha

Sugriva (Sanskrit: सुग्रीव, lit. 'beautiful necked', IAST: Sugrīva), is a character In the ancient Hindu epic Ramayana. He is the younger brother of Vali, whom he succeeded as ruler of the vanara kingdom of Kishkindha. He is a son of Surya, the Hindu deity of the sun. As the king of the vanaras, Sugriva aided Rama in his quest to liberate his wife Sita from captivity at the hands of the rakshasa king Ravana.

== Nomenclature ==
He is also known as Khmer: Sukhreeb, Lao: Sugeep, Lao: Sangkip, Javanese: Sugriwa, Thai: Su-khrip, Creole: Soogrim, Telugu: Sugrīwũdu, Tamil: Sukkrivan, Burmese: Thugyeip, Sugreeva or Sugreev. Malayalam: Sugreevān.

== Legend ==
The story of Sugriva is part of Ramayana and in an abbreviated version, is also present in the Mahabharata.

The king of Kishkindha, Vriksharaja, was a divine creature born from Brahma's tilaka. He had the body of a human and face and tail of a monkey. He was instructed to roam the forests and kill demons. One day, Vriksharaja entered an enchanted pond, and was transformed into a beautiful lady, attracting the attention of both Indra and Surya. Soon after, they each sired Vali and Sugriva respectively. Vali and Sugriva were born having brute strength, equal to Indra and Surya.

According to a legend from the Kathasaritsagara, Aruṇa, the charioteer of Surya, travelled to Devaloka to see the dance of the apsaras. Since men were not allowed to observe the event, Aruna assumed the feminine form of Arunidevi. Observing the beautiful form of Arunidevi, Indra grew infatuated with her, and a child was soon born to them. On the advice of Indra, Arunidevi took the child to Ahalya, leaving it there before the dawn to be brought up by her. This child became Vali. Aruna reported this incident to Surya, who wished to see his female form of Arunidevi as well. Becoming besotted with her, Surya sired a son from her. The child, Sugriva, would also be raised under the care of Ahalya.

=== Quarrel between brothers ===
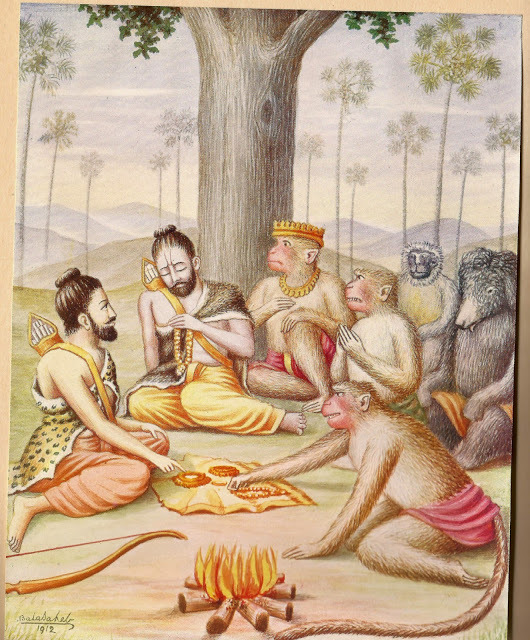
Rama meets Sugriva.

Vali ruled the kingdom of Kishkindha; his subjects were the vanaras. Tara is his wife. Angada is his son. His son left his house at a very young age and later became a follower of Vaishnavism. A raging demon by the name of Mayavi came to the gates of the capital and challenged Vali to a fight. Vali accepted the challenge, but when he sallied forth, the demon fled in terror into a deep cave. Vali entered the cave in pursuit of the demon, telling Sugriva to wait outside. When Vali did not return and upon hearing demonic shouts in the cave and seeing blood streaming from its mouth, Sugriva concluded that his brother had been slain. With a heavy heart, Sugriva rolled a boulder to seal the cave's opening so as to lock the demon in, returned to Kishkindha, and assumed kingship over the vanaras, taking Vali’s wife Tara as his queen. Vali, however, ultimately prevailed in his combat with the demon and returned home. Seeing Sugriva acting as king, he concluded that his brother had betrayed him. Though Sugriva humbly attempted to explain himself, Vali would not listen and exiled Sugriva from the kingdom. To exact his vengeance, Vali forcibly took Sugriva's wife Rumā for his own, and the brothers became bitter enemies. Sugriva went on to live upon the mountain Rishyamukh, the only place on earth that Vali could not tread on. Vali had been previously cursed by Sage Mathanga to be unable to lay a foot on this mountain on pain of death.

=== Sugriva makes an alliance ===
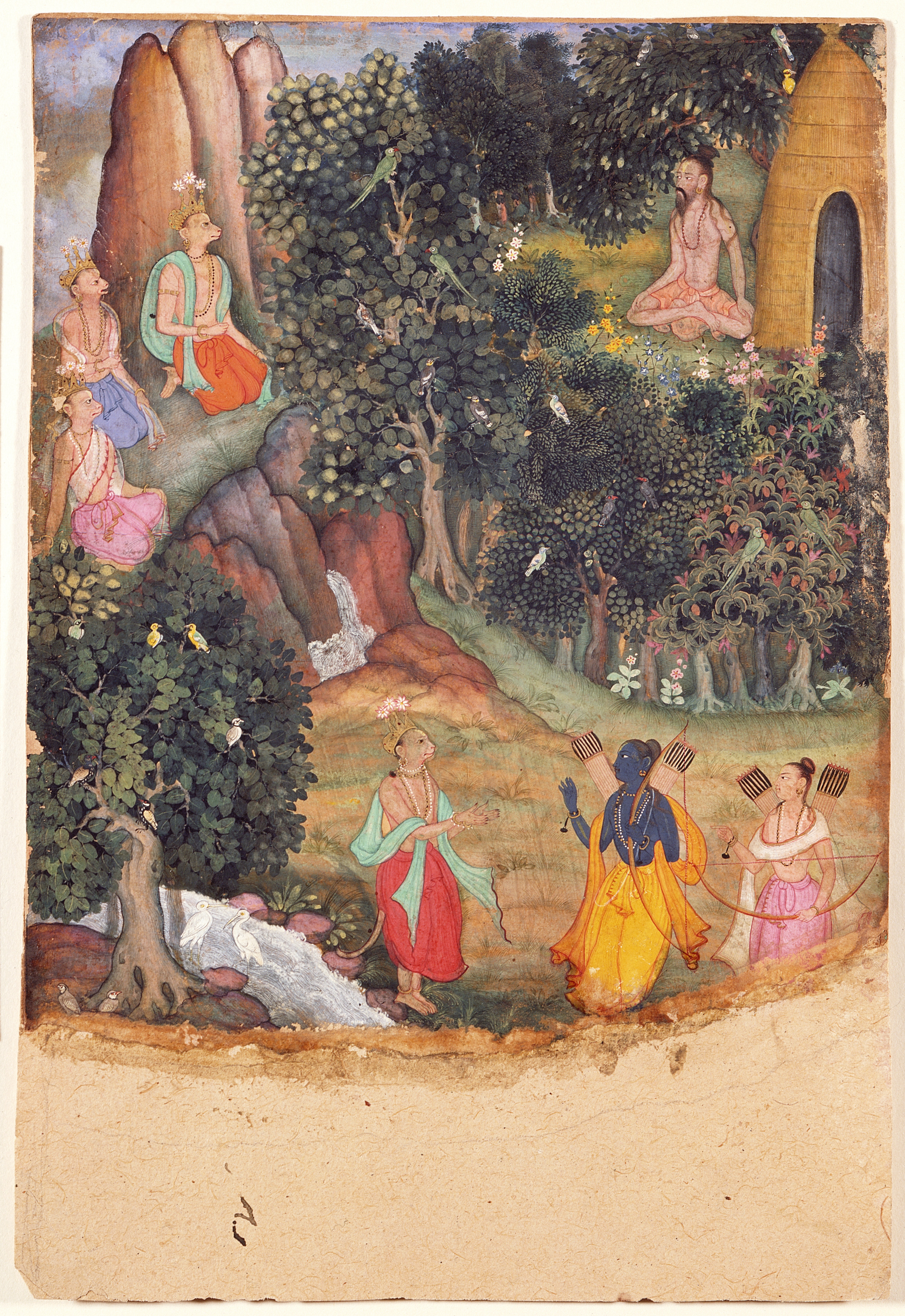
Rama and Lakshmana meet Sugriva at Matanga's hermitage.

In exile, Sugriva made the acquaintance of Rama, the avatar of Vishnu, who is on a quest to rescue his wife Sita from the demon Ravana, king of the rakshasas. Rama promised Sugriva that he would kill Vali and would reinstate Sugriva as the king of the vanaras. Sugriva, in turn, promised to help Rama with his quest.

=== The death of Vali ===
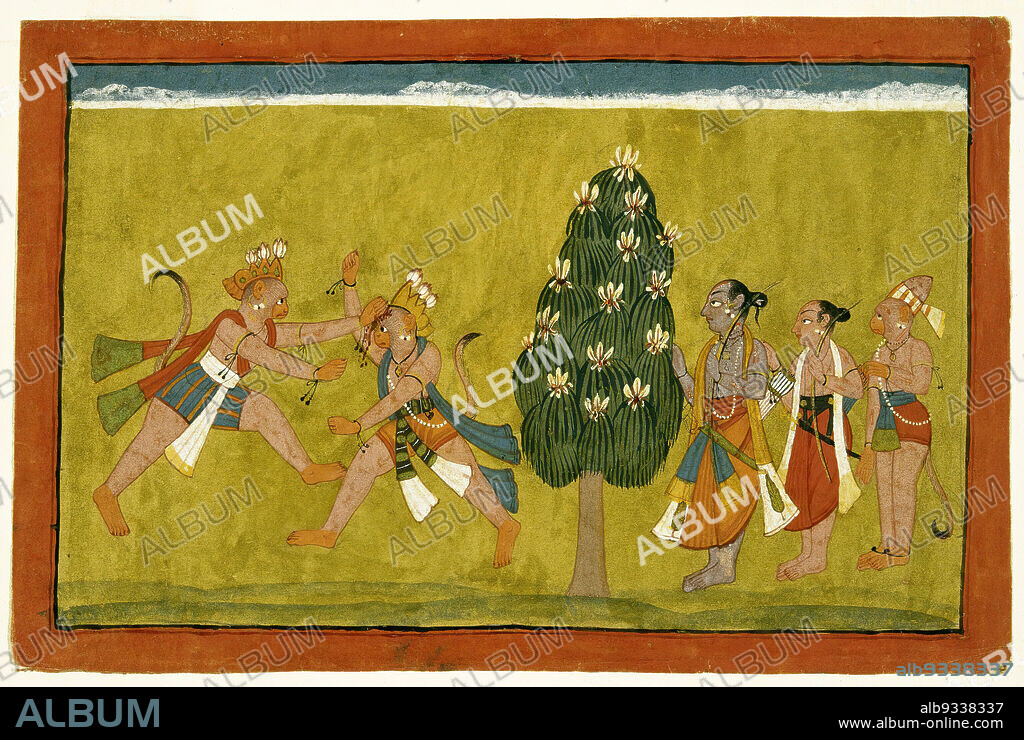
Sugriva fighting his powerful brother King Vali

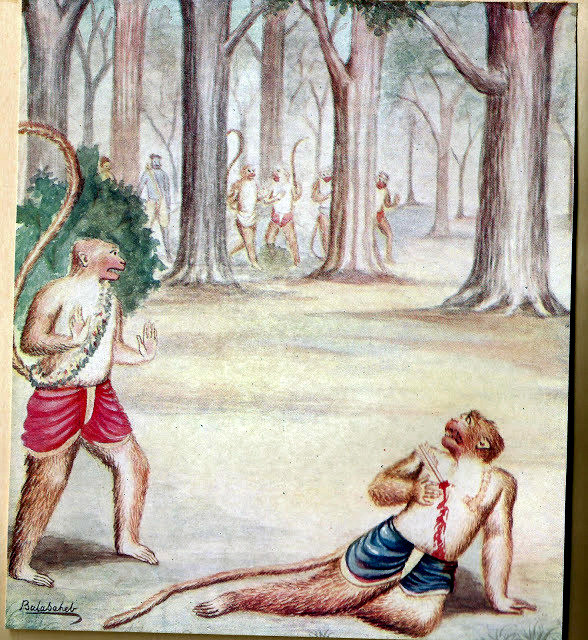
The assassination of Vali

Together, Sugriva and Rama went to seek out Vali. While Rama stood back, Sugriva shouted a challenge and dared him to battle. The brothers rushed at each other, fighting with trees and stones, with fists, nails, and teeth. They were evenly matched and indistinguishable to the observer, until Sugriva's counselor Hanuman, stepped forward and placed a garland of flowers around Sugriva's neck. It is then that Rama emerged with his bow and drove an arrow through Vali's heart. After Vali's death, Sugriva reclaimed the vanara kingdom, took back his first wife, Rumā, who became his queen. Vali's son Angada, became the crown prince.

== Sugriva as king ==
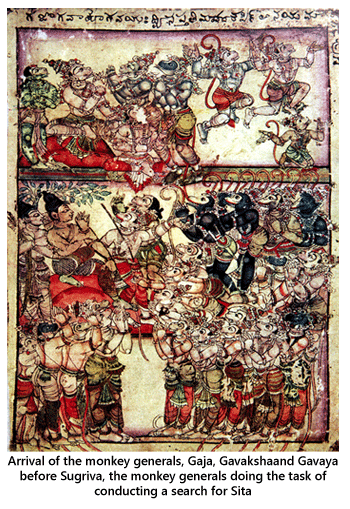
Arrival of monkey Gaja, Gavayu, generals

After the death of Vali he became king of Kishkinda by the wishes of Rama. He helped Rama to fight Ravana in the war of Lanka. He sent the Vanara Warriors to four sides of earth to search for kidnapped sita. For that he ordered all vanaras on the earth should gather in kishkinda. Many vanara chiefs came with their armies. The search team consisted of his elite warriors nephew Angada, Hanuman, Bhalluka Jambavan and other returned with good news that Sita is in Ravana Lanka.

=== War against Ravana ===
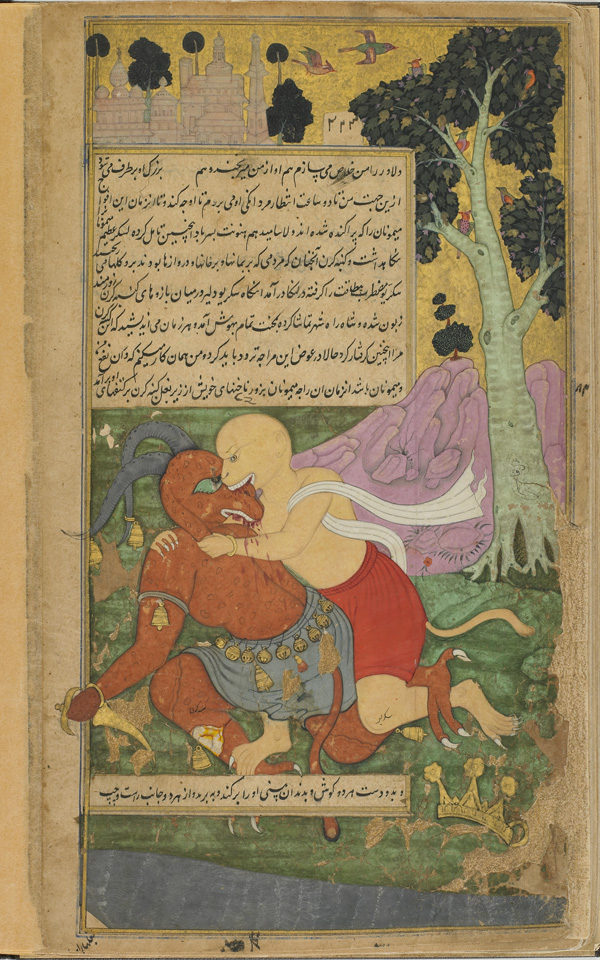
Sugriva gains his freedom by his sudden mutilation of Kumbhakarna.

After that Sugriva personally commanded his vanara army for Rama to relieve Sita who was being held captive by Ravana. Upon reaching Lanka, Sugriva lost his patience on seeing Ravana and an enraged Sugriva attacked Ravana all alone and had a fight with Ravana almost knocking him down but later had to flee when Ravana gained an upper hand in the duel. Sugriva killed Kumbhakarna’s son Kumbha in a fierce duel. He was also imprisoned by Kumbhakarna but Sugriva tricked him and escaped. In a fight against Ravana, he was almost killed but got rescued by Jambavan. Later, Rama killed Ravana and the war was won by Sugriva’s Vanaras and accompanied Rama to Ayodhya.

=== Duel with Lava and Kusha ===
On Lakshmana's request and after Guru Vasistha's approval, Rama plans to do Ashvamedha yajna. At this auspicious occasion he calls Sugriva along with Angada, Nala, Nila, Jambavantha and Hanuman to come to Ayodhya. Rama greets and hugs Sugriva, Jambavantha and others on their arrival to Ayodhya.

The yajna horse is captured by Lava and Kusha brothers. In the Rama's army the news spreads that two muni kumara's has captured the Yagya's horse. Shatrughana walks and fights with Lava and he is defeated by Lava. Then Lakshamana comes and he is also defeated by Lava due to the fact that he was holding back. Then Bharata asks Rama to give him the permission to go to set horse free from both muni Kumara. Sugriva and Hanuman also request Rama to permit them to go along with Bharata in the battle. Lava and Kusha defeat Bharata and Sugriva and took Hanuman as a prisoner. Hanuman is the only one who knew that Lava and Kusha were sons of his master Rama & Sita and thus allowed himself to be imprisoned by his master's sons.

=== Retirement ===
When Rama decided to depart from the world and took samadhi in the Sarayu river, Sugriva also retired from earth and went with his father Surya. He crowned his nephew Angada as the next king of Kishkindha.

== Jainism ==
According to Jain texts, Sugriva is a human being and he took Jain Diksha and attained Moksha from Mangi-Tungi.

== Depictions ==
This tympanum from the Khmer temple of Banteay Srei depicts Sugriva fighting with his brother Vali. To the right, Rama is poised to shoot an arrow at Vali.

- The Dashavatara temple in Deogarh depicts "Sugriva's victory legend".
- The combat of Sugriva with his brother Vali is a common motif of the Khmer sculptors contributing to the Angkorian temples and monuments near Siem Reap in Cambodia.
- A detailed and moving tympanum at the 10th century Hindu temple of Banteay Srei depicts the combat of the brothers, as well as Rama's intervention and Vali's death in the arms of another vanara.
- A bas-relief at the 12th-century temple of Angkor Wat shows the fight between the brothers, arrival of Rama and Vali lying on his death-bed, mourned by many other vanaras. Another scene shows Sugriva and Rama entering into their alliance. A large bas-relief depicts the Battle of Lanka between Rama and Sugriva's army of vanaras and Ravana's army of Rakshasas.
- The fight between Vali and Sugriva is also represented at the lesser-known 13th century Angkorian temple of Preah Pithu.

Artistic depiction of Yakshagana artist

== In popular culture ==
Sugriva was portrayed by Suhail Nayyar in the 2026 film, Ramayana: Part 1.
