= Lanka =

Island kingdom in Hindu mythology

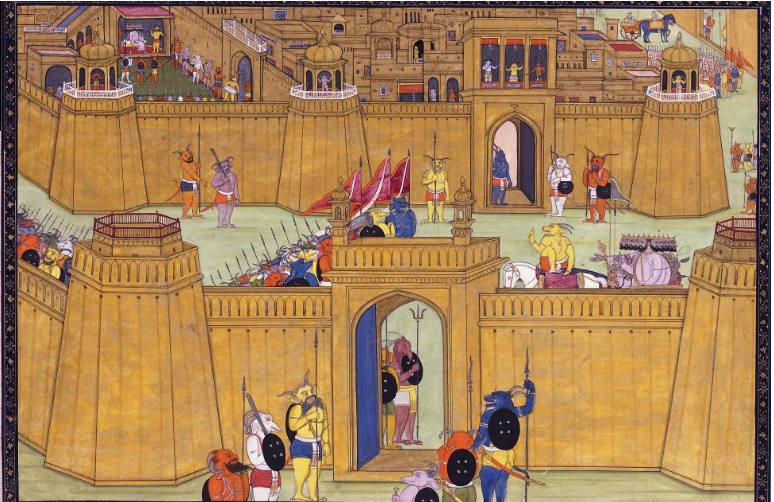
The golden abode of King Ravana

Lanka (/ˈlæŋkə/; Sanskrit: [ˈlɐŋkaː], Laṅkā) is the name given in Hindu epics to the island fortress capital of the legendary Rakshasa king Ravana in the epics of the Ramayana and the Mahabharata. The fortress was situated on a plateau between three mountain peaks known as the Trikuta Mountains. The ancient city of Lankapura is said to have been burnt down by Hanuman. After Ravana was killed by Rama with the help of Ravana's brother Vibhishana, the latter was crowned king of Lankapura. His descendants were said to still rule the kingdom during the period of the Pandavas. According to the Mahabharata, the Pandava Sahadeva visited this kingdom during his southern military campaign for the rajasuya of Yudhishthira. The palaces of Ravana were said to be guarded by four-tusked elephants.

The island now known as Sri Lanka was long identified with the Lanka of the ancient Indian epic. The Pali chronicles, the Dipavamsa (compiled in the 3rd or 4th century AD) and the Mahavamsa (compiled in the 5th century AD), which recount the history of Sri Lanka from 543 BC onward, refer to it simply as Lanka. During British rule, the island was known as Ceylon, but in 1972 it officially adopted the name Sri Lanka, adding the Sanskrit honorific Sri, meaning "resplendent," "holy," or "wealthy," to the ancient name Lanka.

== Ramayana ==
=== Rulers of Lanka ===
According to both the Ramayana and the Mahabharata, Lanka was originally ruled by a rakshasa named Sumali. According to Uttara Kanda, Vishvakarma, the divine architect of the Devas, had originally built Lanka for Shiva, but was seized by the brothers Malyavan, Sumali and Mali. The brothers ruled for thousands of years and invaded Amaravati, the capital of the Devas. After suffering a humiliating and disastrous defeat at the hands of Vishnu, the brothers were too ashamed to return to Lanka. Kubera seized control of Lanka and established the Yaksha kingdom and his capital was guarded by rakshasas. His half-brother Ravana, son of the sage Vishrava and Sumali's daughter Kaikesi, fought with Kubera and took Lanka from him. Ravana ruled Lanka as king of the Rakshasa kingdom. The battle in Lanka is depicted in a famous relief in the 12th-century Khmer temple of Angkor Wat. After Ravana's death, he was succeeded by his brother, Vibhishana.

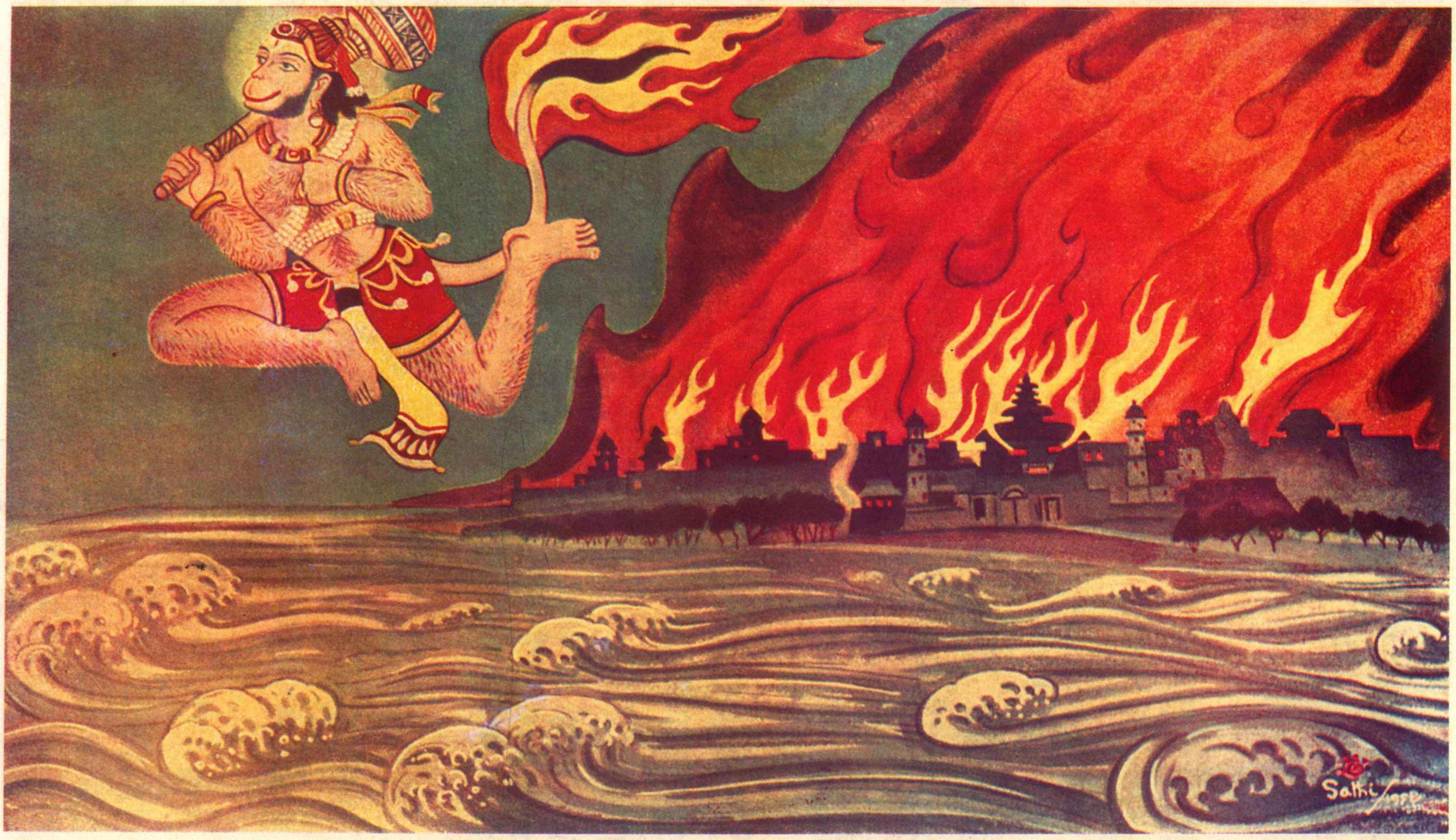
Hanuman sets fire to Lanka.

1. Malyavan, Sumali and Mali were the sons of Sukesha. They ordered Vishvakarma to build the city for them.
2. Kubera was a Yaksha King. He remade and ruled Lanka upon Vishnu's request.
3. Ravana forced his elder brother Kubera to run away from Lanka after his penance to Brahma and Shiva and became the prince of Lanka; Sumali became the King of Lanka again. After Sumali's death, he became the ruler of Lanka.
4. Vibhishana, after Ravana's death, and on the order of Rama, ruled Lanka. He was given immortality by Rama, thus he has ruled Lanka and the Rakshasas ever since.

=== Location of Ravana's "Lanka" according to Ramayana ===
The Lanka referred to in the still-extant Hindu Texts and the Ramayana (referred to as Ravana's Lanka), is considered to be a large island-country, situated in the Indian Ocean. Studies refer that the Palace of Ravana was located in Sigiriya the palace built by the Kashyapa I of Anuradhapura as the legend describes the capital of the kingdom was located between plateaus and forests. Some scholars asserted that it must have been Sri Lanka because it is so stated in the 5th century Sri Lankan text Mahavamsa. The Ramayana states that Ravana's Lanka was situated 100 Yojanas away from mainland India.

Some scholars have interpreted the content of these texts to determine that Lanka was located at the point where the Prime-Meridian of India passes the Equator. This island would therefore lie more than 160 km (100 mi) southwest of present-day country of Sri Lanka. The most original of all the existing versions of Valmiki's Ramayana also suggest the location of Ravana's Lanka to be in the western Indian Ocean. It indicates that Lanka was in the midst of a series of large island-nations, submerged mountains, and sunken plateaus in the western part of the Indian Ocean.

There has been a lot of speculation by several scholars since the 19th century that Ravana's Lanka might have been in the Indian Ocean around where the Maldives once stood as a high mountain, before getting submerged in the Indian Ocean. This speculation is supported by the presence of Minicoy Island in the vicinity between India and Maldives, the ancient name being Minikaa, or Mainaka (the mountain met by Hanuman on his way to Lanka), which in the ancient language of the place means "cannibal", probably a reference to Sursa, as cannibals from the Nicobars were frequently found here, along with snakes. Sumatra and Madagascar has also been suggested as a possibility.

=== Description ===
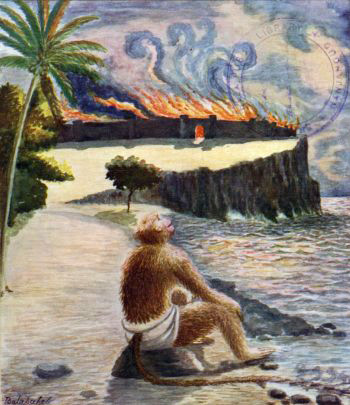
Hanuman Watches Lanka Burn, Bhawanrao Shriniwasrao Pant Pratinidhi, 1916

Ravana's Lanka, and its capital Lankapuri, are described in a manner that seems superhuman even by modern-day standards. Ravana's central palace complex (main citadel) was a massive collection of several edifices that reached over one yojana (13 km or 8 mi) in height, one yojana in length, and half a yojana in breadth. The island had a large mountain range known as the Trikuta Mountain (Trikonamalai-In Tamil/Trinkomale-English, where Ravan built Temple for shiva), atop which was situated Ravana's capital of Lanka, at the center of which in turn stood his citadel.

== References to Lanka in the Mahabharata ==
Many of the references to Lanka in the Mahabharata are found in sage Markandeya's narration of the story of Rama and Sita to the king Yudhishthira, which narration amounts to a truncated version of the Ramayana. The references in the following summary are to the Mahabharata and adhere to the following form: (book:section). Markandeya's narration of the story begins at Book III (Varna Parva), Section 271 of the Mahabharata.

=== Sahadeva's expedition to South ===
Sahadeva — the son of Pandu, conquered the town of Sanjayanti and the country of the Pashandas and the Karanatakas, utilizing his messengers alone and made them all pay tributes to him. The hero brought under his subjection, and exacted tributes from the Paundrayas (Pandyas) and the Dravidas; along with the Udrakeralas, the Andhras, the Talavanas, the Kalingas, the Ushtrakarnikas, and also the city of Atavi and that of the Yavanas.

He has arrived at the seashore, then dispatched with great assurance messengers unto the illustrious Vibhishana, the grandson of Pulastya and the ruler of Lanka (2:30).

=== Presence of the King of Lanka in Yudhishthira's Rajasuya ===
Lanka king is listed as present in the conclave of kings present in Pandava king Yudhishthira's Rajasuya sacrifice.

The Vangas and Angas and Paundras and Odras and Cholas and Dravidas and Cheras and Pandyas and Mushika and Andhakas, and the chiefs of many islands and countries on the seaboard as also of frontier states, including the rulers of the Sinhalas, the barbarous mlecchas, the natives of Lanka, and all the kings of the West by hundreds, and all the chiefs of the seacoast, and the kings of the Pahlavas and the Daradas and the various tribes of the Kiratas and Yavanas and Sakras and the Harahunas and Chinas and Tukharas and the Sindhavas and the Jagudas and the Ramathas and the Mundas and the inhabitants of the kingdom of women and the Tanganas and the Kekayas and the Malavas and the inhabitants of Kasmira... (3:51).

=== Other fragmentary references ===
- Lanka, with its warriors, and horses, elephants and chariots (3:149).
- Lanka with its towers and ramparts and gates (3:147)
- The walls of Lanka (3:282).
- 4 tusked elephants (4.27.12)

== See also ==
- Sri Lanka
- Mahajanapadas
- Ancient clans of Lanka
- Naga people
- Sinhala Kingdom
- Vishvakarma
