= Panchakanya =

Group of five iconic heroines of Hindu epics

The Panchakanya (Sanskrit: पञ्चकन्या, romanized: Pañcakanyā, lit. 'Five maidens') is a group of five iconic women of the Hindu epics, extolled in a hymn and whose names are believed to dispel sin when recited. They are Ahalya, Draupadi, Kunti, Tara, and Mandodari. While Draupadi and Kunti are from the Mahabharata, Ahalya, Tara, and Mandodari are from the Ramayana. The Panchakanya are regarded to be ideal women who exemplify perfect wives in Hinduism.

== Etymology ==
Panchakanya literally means five kanyas. Kanya may be translated as girl, daughter, maiden, or virgin.

== Hymn ==
A well-known Sanskrit hymn that defines the Panchakanya runs as:

Sanskrit transliteration
ahalyā draupadī sītā tārā mandodarī tathā ।
pañcakanyāḥ smarennityaṃ mahāpātakanāśinīḥ ॥

English translation
Ahalya, Draupadi, Sita, Tara and Mandodari
One should forever remember the panchakanya who are the destroyers of great sins

A variant from the of Brahma purana 3.7.229 by Vyasa replaces Sita with Kunti:

Sanskrit transliteration
ahalyā draupadī kuṃtī tārā mandodarī tathā ।
pañcakanyāḥ smarennityaṃ mahāpātakanāśinīm ॥

Differences are underlined.

Practising Hindus, especially Hindu wives, remember the Panchakanya in this daily morning prayer. Their names are extolled and the prayer is called a pratah-smaraniyah, prescribed to be recited in the early hours of the morning.

== From the Ramayana ==
The kanyas of Ahalya, Tara, and Mandodari appear in the Hindu epic Ramayana. Sita, its female protagonist, is sometimes included in the panchakanya list.

=== Ahalya ===
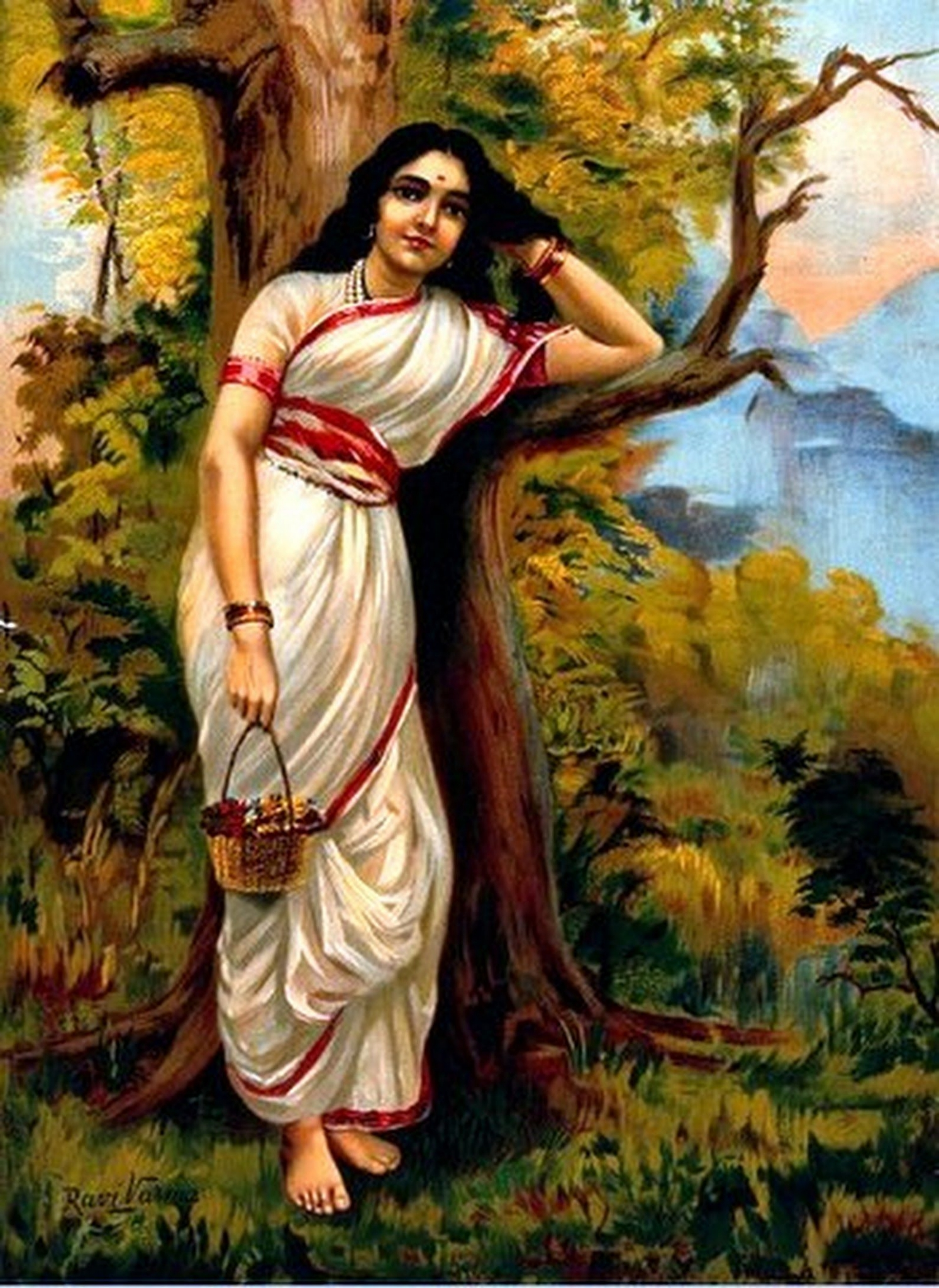
Ahalya by Raja Ravi Varma

Ahalya, also known as Ahilya, is the wife of the sage Gautama. Ahalya is described to be created by the creator-god Brahma as a flawless beauty, but also sometimes as a mortal princess of the Lunar dynasty. Ahalya is placed in the care of Gautama until she attains puberty. When the sage returns her to Brahma, the deity is pleased by his self-restraint and bestows her upon him.

The king of the devas, Indra, is infatuated with her beauty, and comes disguised as Gautama when the sage is away and requests or orders that they engage in sexual intercourse. In the Ramayana, Ahalya sees through his disguise, but still complies out of "curiosity". In later versions, Ahalya falls prey to Indra's trickery and does not recognise him, or is raped. In all narratives, Ahalya and Indra are cursed by Gautama. Although early texts describe how Ahalya must atone by undergoing severe penance while remaining invisible to the world and how she is purified by offering Rama (an avatar of the god Vishnu and protagonist of the Ramayana) hospitality, in the popular retelling developed over time, Ahalya is cursed to become a stone and regains her human form after she is brushed by Rama's foot. Some versions also mention that she is turned into a dry stream and that she would be condoned of her guilt when eventually the stream starts flowing and joins the river Gautami (Godavari). Indra is cursed to be castrated or be covered by a thousand vulvae that ultimately turned into a thousand eyes.

=== Tara ===
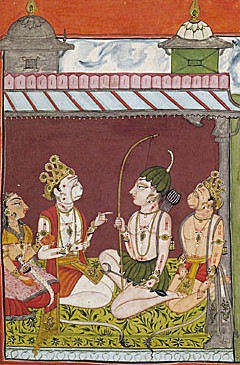
Tara and Sugriva (left) meet Lakshmana and Hanuman (right) in the palace of Kishkindha

Tara is the queen consort of Kishkindha and wife of the vānara-king Vāli. After being widowed, she maintains her title after marrying Sugriva, Vali's brother. Tara is described as the daughter of the vanara physician, Sushena, in the Ramayana; in later sources, she is stated to be an apsara (celestial nymph) who emerged from the Samudra Manthana (churning of the ocean). She marries Vali and bears him a son named Angada. After Vali is presumed dead in a battle with an asura named Mayavi, his brother Sugriva becomes king and appropriates Tara. However, Vali returns, regains Tara, and exiles his brother, accusing him of treachery. He also appropriates Sugriva's first wife, Ruma. When Sugriva challenges Vali to a duel, Tara wisely advises Vali not to accept because of the former's alliance with Rama, but Vali does not heed her. In the ensuing duel, Vali dies from Rama's arrow, shot at the behest of Sugriva. In his dying breath, Vali reconciles with Sugriva and instructs him to follow Tara's wise counsel in all matters. Tara's lamentation forms an important part in most versions of the tale. While in most vernacular versions, Tara casts a curse on Rama by the power of her chastity, in some versions, Rama enlightens Tara. Sugriva returns to the throne, but spends his time carousing often with his chief queen Tara, failing to act on his promise to assist Rama in recovering his kidnapped wife, Sita. Tara—now Sugriva's queen and chief diplomat—is then instrumental in tactfully reconciling Rama with Sugriva after pacifying Lakshmana, Rama's brother, who is about to destroy Kishkindha in retribution for Sugriva's perceived treachery.

=== Mandodari ===
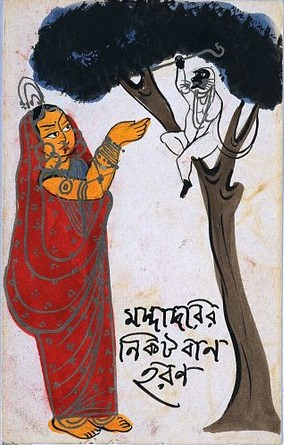
Hanuman steals from Mandodari the weapon that leads to Ravana's death.

Mandodari is the chief queen consort of Ravana, the rakshasa king of Lanka and the primary antagonist of the epic. The Hindu epics describe her as beautiful, pious, and righteous. She is the daughter of Mayasura, the king of the asuras, and the apsara (celestial nymph) Hema. Some tales narrate how an apsara called Madhura is cursed to become a frog and imprisoned in a well for twelve years, after which she regains her beauty, and blessed to become a beautiful maiden; in both cases, she is adopted by Mayasura as his daughter Mandodari. Ravana comes to the abode of Mayasura, falls in love with Mandodari, and then marries her. Mandodari bears him three sons: Meghanada (Indrajita), Atikaya, and Akshayakumara. Despite her husband's faults, Mandodari loves him and advises him to follow the path of righteousness. Mandodari repeatedly advises Ravana to return Sita to Rama, but her advice falls on deaf ears. Her love and loyalty to Ravana are praised in the Ramayana. Different versions of Ramayana record her ill-treatment at the hands of Rama's vanara generals. Some versions say they humiliate her while disturbing a sacrifice by Ravana, while others narrate how they destroy her chastity, which protects Ravana's life. In some regional folklore, Hanuman tricks her into disclosing the location of a magical arrow, which Rama uses to kill Ravana. After Ravana's death, Vibhishana—Ravana's younger brother who joins forces with Rama —marries Mandodari on the advice of Rama. In some versions, Mandodari curses Sita that Rama would abandon her.

=== Sita ===
Sita is the goddess of the Ramayana and the consort of the Hindu god Rama. Sita and Rama are avatars of Vishnu and his wife Lakshmi, goddess of wealth. She is esteemed as a model of wifely and womanly virtues for all Hindu women. Sita is the adopted daughter of Janaka, king of Videha, found while he was furrowing the earth. The prince of Ayodhya, Rama wins Sita in her svayamvara. Later, when Rama is sentenced to a fourteen-year exile, Sita joins him and his brother Lakshmana, despite Rama's wish for her to remain in Ayodhya. In the Dandaka forest, she falls prey to Ravana's scheme and sends Rama away in the quest for a golden deer. She is kidnapped by Ravana, and imprisoned in the Ashoka Vatika grove of Lanka until she is rescued by Rama, who slays Ravana in war. Sita proves her chastity by undergoing a trial by fire, and both return with Lakshmana to Ayodhya, where Rama is crowned King. When a washerman casts doubts on her chastity, the pregnant Sita is left in the forest. Sita gives birth to twins Lava and Kusha in the hermitage of sage Valmiki, who protects her. Her sons grow and reunite with Rama; Sita is asked to prove her chastity before Rama can take her back. However, Sita chooses to return to the womb of her mother, Earth.

== From the Mahabharata ==
The Hindu epic Mahabharata features Draupadi and Kunti, the latter of whom is sometimes included in the Panchakanya.

=== Draupadi ===
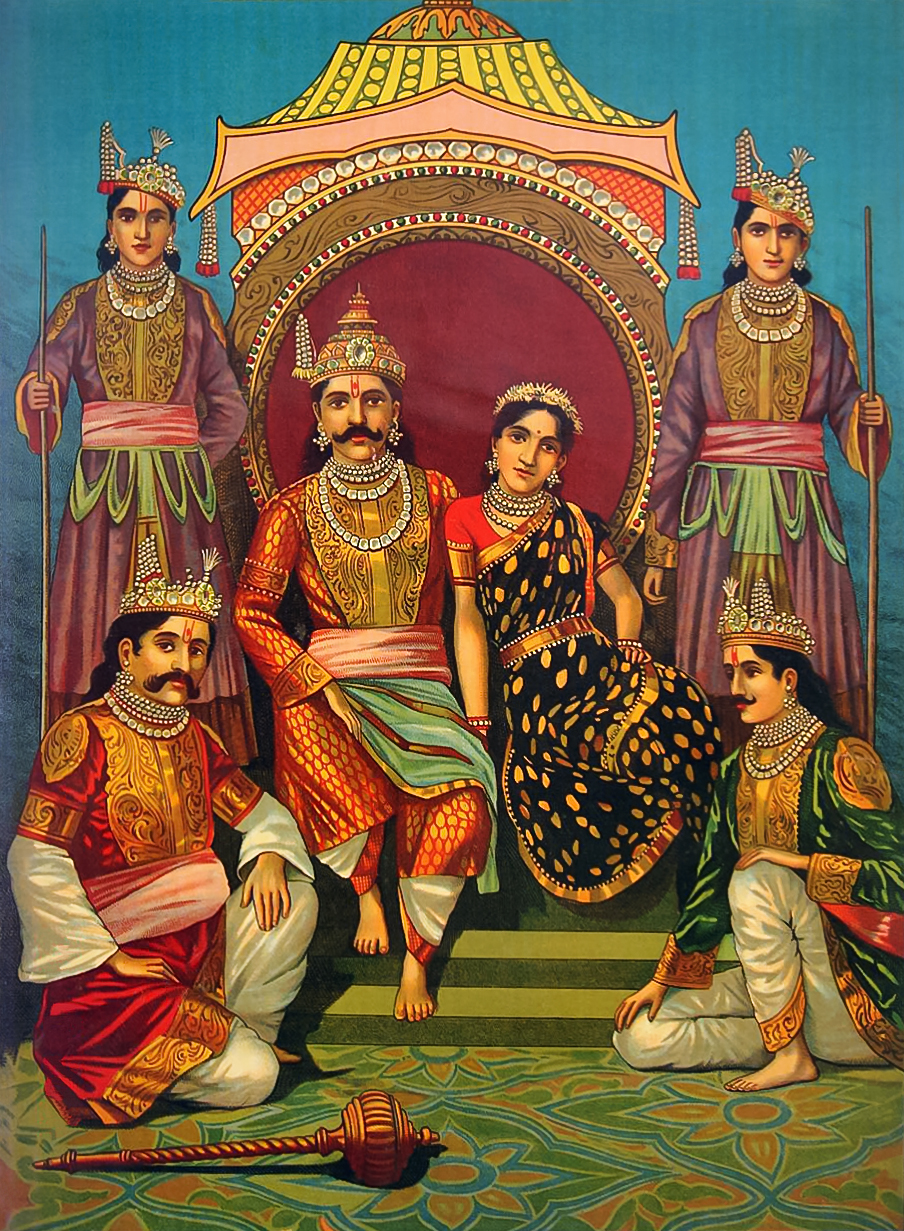
Draupadi with the Pandavas

Draupadi is the female protagonist of the Mahabharata. She is the common wife of the five Pandava brothers and queen of Hastinapura, during the reign of the eldest Pandava, Yudhishthira. Born from a fire-sacrifice of the king of Panchala, Drupada, Draupadi is prophesied to lead to the end of Drona and the Kauravas. The Pandava Arjuna, disguised as a Brahmin, wins her in her svayamvara. In popular renditions, she refuses to marry Karna on account of his low-birth (this is excised in the Critical Edition of Mahabharata as later interpolation owing to the existence of older Sanskrit editions where Karna fails to string the bow.) Draupadi marries all five of the brothers on the inadvertent word of her mother-in-law, Kunti. The Pandavas agree to the plan that Draupadi would always be the chief consort of all the brothers, and would receive the title of empress. It is stipulated that Draupadi spend a year with each Pandava; any of the other four brothers who interrupts them during their private time within that year is to embark on a pilgrimage of twelve years. She mothers five sons from each of the Pandavas, regaining her virginity after every year.

In a chapter of the epic, Duryodhana falls a into lake of crystal water after mistaking it for land during a rajasuya yajna, and is laughed at by Bhima, Arjuna, Nakula, Sahadeva, and their servants. In modern adaptations, Draupadi is presented as the one who laughed. When the eldest Pandava Yudhishthira loses her to Kauravas in a game of dice, Dushasana tries to disrobe her in the royal court. Krishna intervenes to save her dignity, causing her garments to extend infinitely in length. The Pandavas and Draupadi are forced to live in exile for a period of thirteen years for losing the game. While in exile in the forest, Draupadi's second husband Bhima, rescues her from various rakshasas and Jayadratha, who abducted her. She also instructs Krishna's third queen, Satyabhama, on the duties of a wife. In the 13th year of their exile, Draupadi and her husbands spend life incognito in Virata's court. She serves as the maid of the queen and is harassed by the queen's brother Kichaka, who is killed by Bhima. After life in exile, the Kurukshetra War ensues between the Kauravas and Pandavas, in which the Kauravas are slain. The insult to Draupadi is avenged, but she also loses her father, brothers, and sons in battle. Yudhishthira became the emperor of Hastinapura, with Draupadi as his chief empress consort.

At the end of their lives, Draupadi and her husbands journey to the Himalayas to walk to heaven; Draupadi falls in the middle of the journey, ascribed to the fact that she is stated to have loved Arjuna more than her other husbands.

=== Kunti ===
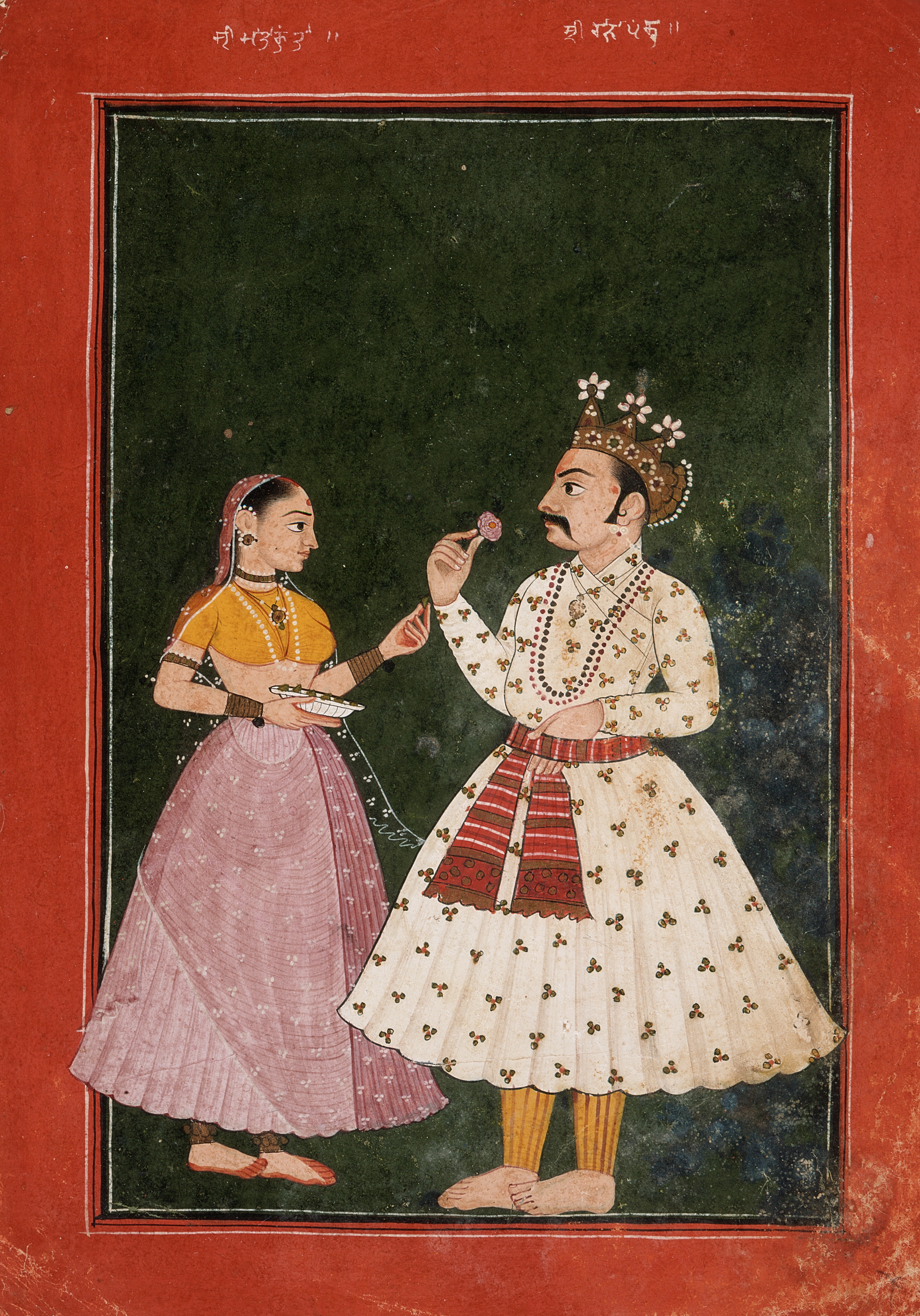
Pandu and Kunti

Kunti is the first and principal wife of Pandu, the king of Hastinapura and mother of the three eldest Pandavas. Named Pritha at birth, Kunti is described as the daughter of the Yadava king Shurasena and is adopted by the childless Kuntibhoja, the king of the Kunti kingdom. By her service, she propitiates the sage Durvasa, who grants her a mantra by which she could summon a deity and have a child by him. She recklessly tests the boon and invokes the sun-god Surya. The deity grants her a son named Karna, whom she abandons. Kunti chooses Pandu in her svayamvara. Pandu abdicates after being cursed by a sage that his sexual union with a woman would result in his death. At Pandu's behest, Kunti uses Durvasa's boon to mother Yudhishthira from the god Yama, Bhima from Vayu, and Arjuna from Indra. Her co-wife Madri bears the twins Nakula and Sahadeva from the Ashvins. After the death of Pandu, Madri blames herself for being the cause of Pandu's death and performs sati on his funeral pyre. Kunti returns to Hastinapura and takes care of the five Pandavas.

Kunti befriends Vidura, the step-brother of Pandu, and the advisor of the king. When Duryodhana schemes to assassinate Kunti and the Pandavas in the Lakshagriha, they escape. She prevents Bhima from killing the rakshasi Hidimbi and advises him to marry her and beget a son, Ghatotkacha. She instructs her children to take care of the common people and orders Bhima to kill the rakshasa named Baka. After Arjuna wins Draupadi's hand in marriage, the Pandavas return home, rhetorically asking Kunti to see what they had brought with them. Not seeing Draupadi, she instructs the brothers to share whatever bhiksha (alms) they had procured equally among themselves, leading to their polygynous marriage with her. Kunti and Pandavas return to Hastinapura. When the Pandavas are sent to a 13-year exile when defeated in a game of dice by the Kauravas, Kunti stays with Vidura. Before the Kurukshetra War, Kunti reveals to Karna - now a Kaurava general - about her identity as his mother. She persuades him to promise her that he would not attempt to kill any of the Pandavas, with the exception of Arjuna. After the war, in which Kauravas and Karna were killed, Kunti, along with Dhritarashtra and Gandhari, retire to the forest to spend the rest of her life in prayer. She is killed in a forest-fire, and attains heaven.

== Common Features ==
All kanyas lack mothers in their life. Ahalya, Tara, Mandodari, Sita and Draupadi have supernatural births while Kunti is adopted at birth and separated from her mother. Though all of the kanyas are described as mothers, except Draupadi, no kanyas' motherhood is emphasized in their tales. Another common element is the theme of loss in their legends. Ahalya is cursed and abandoned by her family. Tara lost her husband, Draupadi loses her 5 sons and Mandodari loses her husband, sons and kin in war. Each of them suffers a tragedy but battles on with life and society. Ahalya is punished for her infidelity. Draupadi, in spite of being dedicated and virtuous, has her dignity violated by men. Another defining feature is all the kanyas (barring Sita who is rarely included in the list) are associated with more than one man within socially acknowledged wedlock or consensual companionship. Ahalya with Gautama and Indra; Tara with Vali and Sugriva; Mandodari with Ravana and Vibhishana; Draupadi with her five husbands, and Kunti with Pandu and the three gods who fathered her sons.

The Mahari dance tradition equates the panchakanya with the five elements. Ahalya, Draupadi, Sita, Tara and Mandodari represent water, fire, earth, wind and ether respectively. In a similar analogy, writer Vimla Patil associates Ahalya, Draupadi, Sita, Tara and Mandodari with the wind, fire, earth, sky and water respectively.

== In popular culture ==
The Nobel Laureate Rabindranath Tagore wrote a collection of poems titled Pancha Kanya with themes of episodes from mythology of Panchakanya.

The tales of the Panchakanya remain popular motifs in the Mahari dance tradition of Odisha.

The Panchakanya are regarded by one view as ideal women. George M. Williams remarks, "They are not perfect but they fulfil their dharma (duty) as mothers, sisters, wives and occasionally leaders in their own right." Another view considers them exemplary chaste women or satis (chaste women) as per the Mahari dance tradition, and worthy as an ideal for "displaying some outstanding quality. Women who suffered most in their lives and who had followed the dictate and regulations prescribed in the scriptures for women were considered. They, as prescribed in Manu Smirti, Ramayana and Mahabharata epics, were considered as the Five ideal Woman, all married.

Another view does not regard Panchakanya as ideal women who should be emulated. Bhattacharya, author of Panch-Kanya: The Five Virgins of Indian Epics contrasts Panchakanya with the five satis enlisted in another traditional prayer: Sati, Sita, Savitri, Damayanti, and Arundhati. He rhetorically asks, "Are then Ahalya, Draupadi, Kunti, Tara and Mandodari not chaste wives because each has known a man or more than one, other than her husband?"

== Sources ==
- Chattopadhyaya, Kamaladevi (1982). Indian Women's Battle for Freedom. Abhinav Publications.
- Kelkar, Meena K. (1995). Subordination of Woman: A New Perspective. Discovery Publishing House. ISBN 978-81-7141-294-5.
- Mani, Vettam (1975). Puranic Encyclopaedia: a Comprehensive Dictionary with Special Reference to the Epic and Puranic Literature. Motilal Banarsidass Publishers. ISBN 978-0-8426-0822-0.
- Mukherjee, Prabhati (1999) [1978]. Hindu Women: Normative Models. Orient Blackswan. ISBN 978-81-250-1699-1.
- Söhnen-Thieme, Renate (1996). "The Ahalya Story Through the Ages". In Leslie, Julia (ed.). Myth and Mythmaking: Continuous Evolution in Indian Tradition. Curzon Press. ISBN 978-0-7007-0303-6.
