= Mandodari =

Chief wife of Lanka king Ravana in Hindu epic Ramayana

- Member of Panchakanya
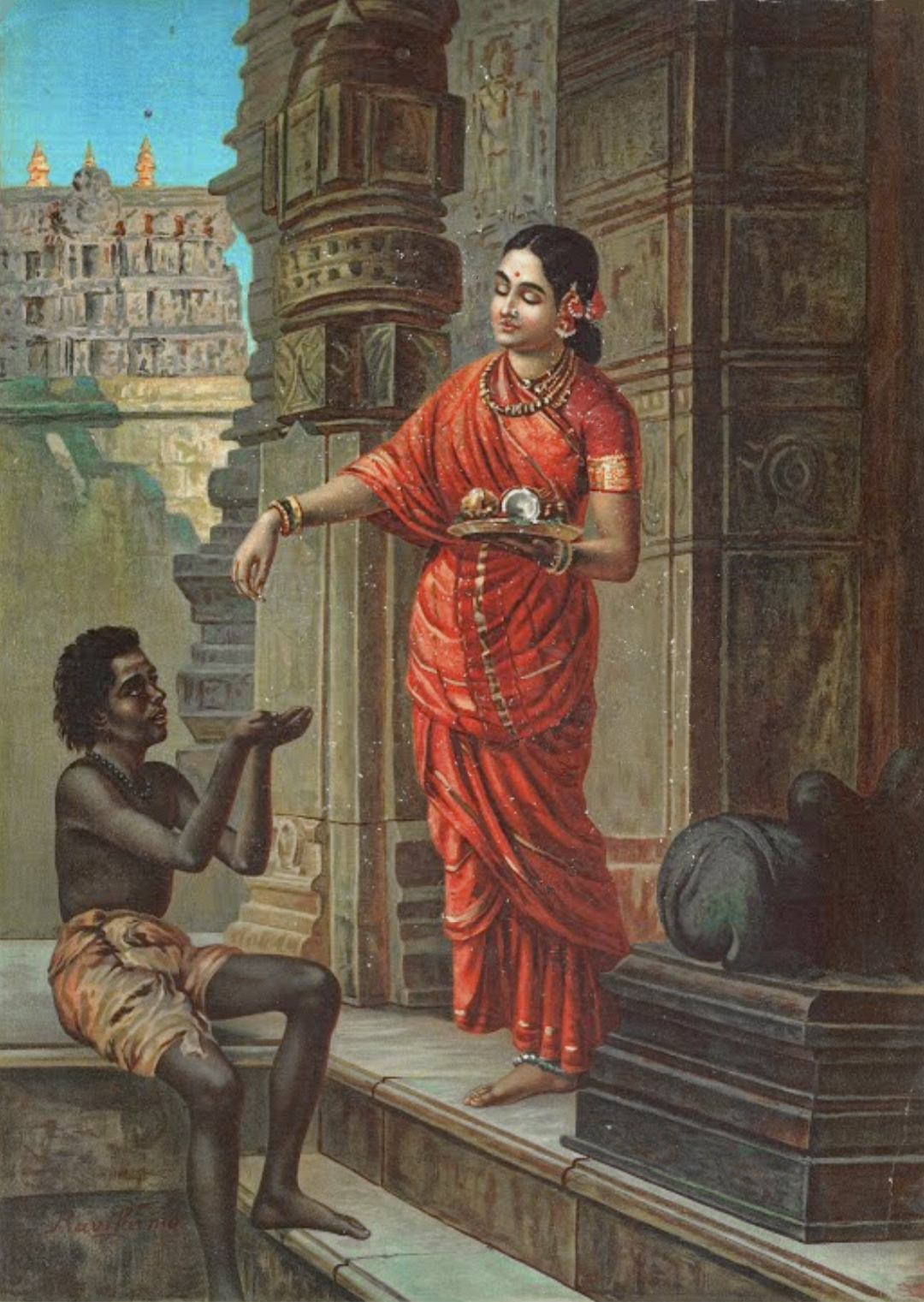
- Raja Ravi Varma's lithograph on Mandodari
- Devanagari: मंदोदरी
- Sanskrit transliteration: Mandodarī
- Affiliation: Rakshasi; Panchakanya
- Abode: Lanka
- Texts: Ramayana and its versions

Genealogy
- Parents: Mayasura (father); Hema (mother)
- Siblings: Mayavi, Dundubhi and Vyomasura (brothers)
- Consort: Ravana
- Children: Meghanada Akshayakumara Atikaya (sons)

Mandodari (Sanskrit: मंदोदरी, Mandodarī, lit. "soft-bellied";) was the queen consort of Ravana, the king of Lanka, according to the Hindu epic Ramayana. The Ramayana describes her as beautiful, pious, and righteous. She is extolled as one of the Panchakanya, the recital of whose names is believed to dispel sin.

Mandodari was the daughter of Mayasura, the King of the Asuras (demons), and the apsara (celestial nymphs) Hema. She marries Ravana and bears three sons: Meghanada (Indrajit), Atikaya and Akshayakumara. Despite her husband's faults, Mandodari loves him and advises him to follow the path of righteousness. She repeatedly advises Ravana to return Sita to Rama, but her advice falls on deaf ears. Her love and loyalty to Rāvana are praised in the Rāmāyana.

In a version of Ramayana, Hanuman tricks her into disclosing the location of a magical arrow which Rama uses to kill Ravana. Many versions of Ramayana state that after Ravana's death, Vibhishana—Ravana's younger brother who joins forces with Rama, does so on Mandodari's advice.

== Birth and early life ==
The Uttara Kanda of the Ramayana mentions that Māyāsura visited Svarga (heaven), where the apsara Hema was given to him by the gods. They had two sons, Mayavi and Dundubhi, and a daughter, Mandodari. Later, Hema returned to heaven, Mandodari and her siblings were left with their father.

There are varying accounts of Mandodari's birth. The Telugu text Uttara Ramayana mentions that Mayasura is married to the apsara Hema. They have two sons, Mayavi and Dundubhi, but long for a daughter, so they start performing penances to seek the favour of the god Shiva. Meanwhile, an apsara named Madhura arrives at Mount Kailash, the abode of Shiva, to pay her respects. In absence of his wife Parvati, Madhura makes love with the god. When Parvati returns, she finds traces of ashes from her husband’s body on the breasts of Madhura. Agitated, Parvati curses Madhura and sends her to live in a well as a frog for twelve years. Shiva told Madhura that she will become a beautiful woman and be married to a great valorous man. After twelve years, Madhura becomes a beautiful maiden again and cries out loudly from the well. Mayasura and Hema, who are performing penance nearby, answer her call and adopt her as their daughter. They bring her up as Mandodari. In this version, Meghanada, the son of the demon-king Ravana and Mandodari, is said to originate from the seed of Shiva embedded in Mandodari's body.

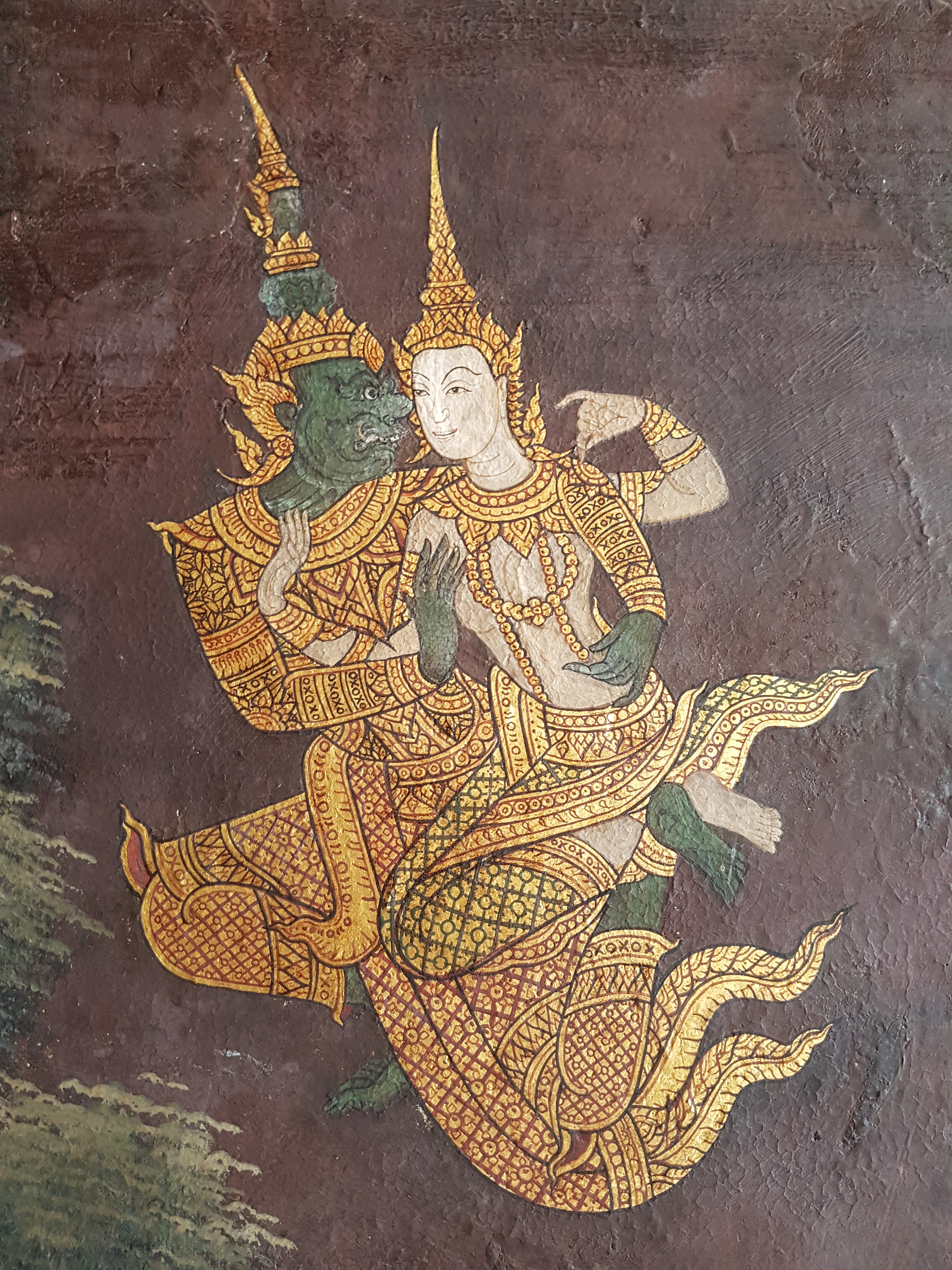
Scene from the Thai Ramakien, Thotsakan (Ravana), carries Montho (Mandodari) back to his kingdom.

In the Telugu Ranganatha Ramayana, Parvati creates a doll, which is turned into a damsel by Shiva. However later, Parvati becomes worried due to the maiden's beauty; Shiva turns her into a frog, who is later turned back to a human and granted to Mayasura as a daughter. In another Telugu tale and the Kuchipudi dance tradition, Ravana asks Shiva for Parvati as his wife. Shiva consents; however Parvati creates a look-alike maiden from a frog and entrusts her to Ravana. Since the woman was created from a frog, she was called Mandodari. In the Ananda Ramayana, Vishnu creates Mandodari from sandalwood paste smeared on his body and rescues Parvati from Ravana by handing him Mandodari as the real Parvati.

The frog motif also reiterated in other stories. The Odia Dharma Purana narrates that the earth sends her son Maninaga to poison their cow's milk of the sages Mandar and Udar, who had denied her the share of the milk. A female frog jumps in the vessel to save the sages. Cursed by the sages for her supposed gluttony, she turns into a beautiful maiden called Vengavati. She has pre-marital coitus with Vali. Ravana demands her hand in marriage from the sages, who refuse. Ravana assumes Vali's form and kidnaps Vengavati. The real Vali and Ravana pull in opposite directions, thereby tearing her apart. As a consequence, Angada (generally described as Tara's son) is born. The death-god Yama and wind-god Vayu resurrect her and is named as Mandodari, after the two sages. Mahari dance tradition narrates a similar tale where a snake poisoned the milk of a hermit; the female frog jumps in the milk and dies to rescue the sage. She is cursed by the hermit in the misbelief of her greed and turns into the beautiful Mandodari.

== Marriage with Ravana ==
Ravana comes to the house of Mayasura and falls in love with Mandodari. Mandodari and Ravana are soon married with Vedic rites. Mandodari bears Ravana's three sons: Meghanada (Indrajit), Atikaya and Akshayakumara. Mandore, a town located 9 km north of Jodhpur, is believed to be the native place of Mandodari. Ravana is treated as a son-in-law among some local Brahmins and has a temple dedicated to him here.

Despite Ravana's faults, Mandodari loves him and is proud of his strength. She is aware of Ravana's weakness towards women. A righteous woman, Mandodari tries to lead Ravana to righteousness, but Ravana always ignores her advice. She advises him not to subdue the Navagraha, the nine celestial beings that govern one's destiny, and not to seduce Vedavati, who would be reborn as Sita and cause the destruction of Ravana.

== Saviour of Sita ==
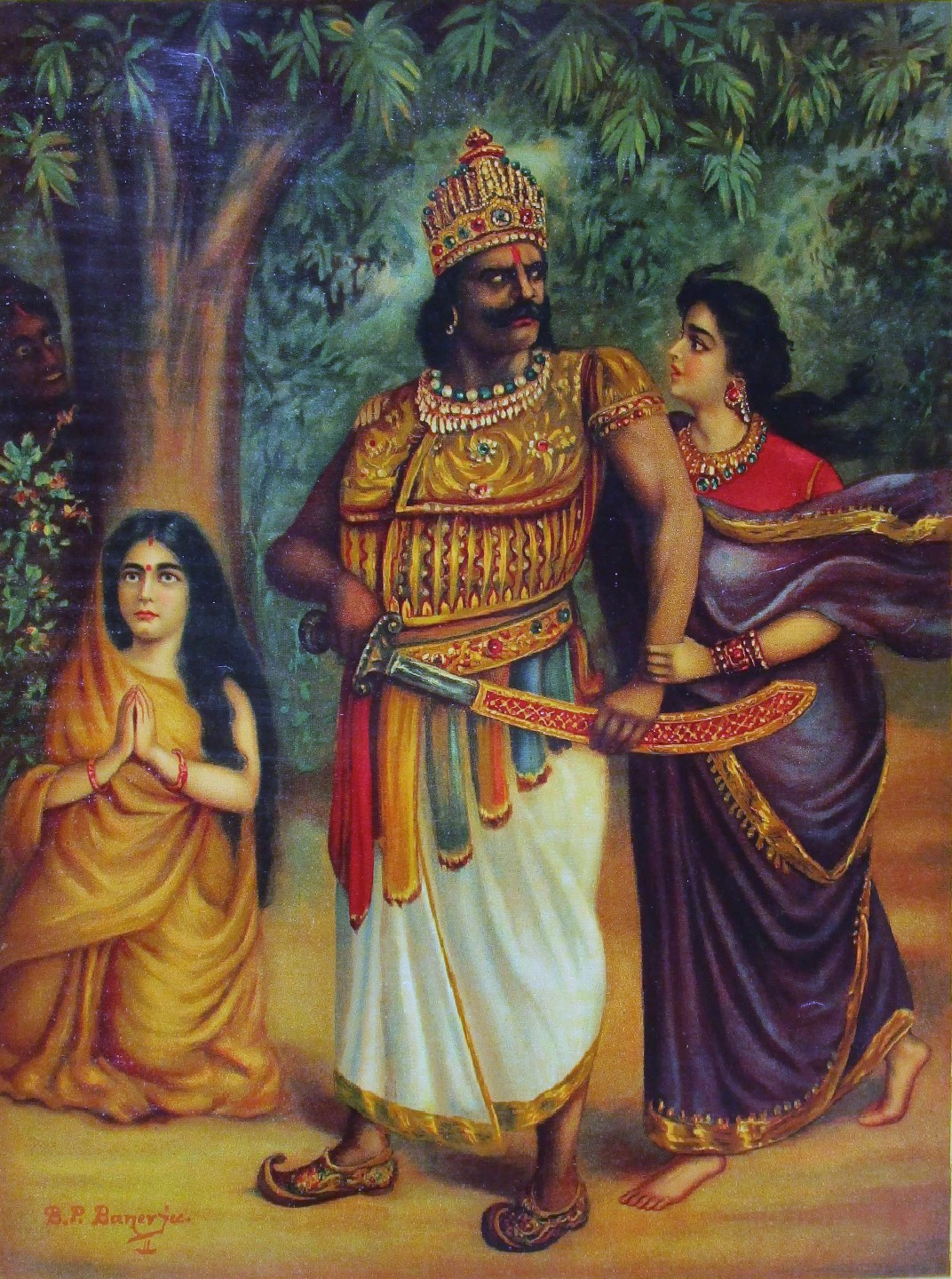
Mandodari stops Ravana from slaying Sita.

Mandodari is described as a beautiful woman in Valmiki's Ramayana. When Hanuman, the monkey messenger of Rama, comes to Lanka in search of Sita, he is stupefied by Mandodari's beauty when he enters Ravana's bed chambers and mistakes Mandodari for Sita. When Hanuman finally finds Sita, he finds Ravana threatening to kill Sita unless she marries him. Ravana raises his sword to behead Sita when she refuses. Mandodari saves Sita by holding Ravana's hand. Mandodari says that the murder of a woman is a heinous sin and thus Ravana should not kill Sita. She asks Ravana to entertain himself with his other wives and give up the idea of having Sita as his wife. Ravana spares Sita's life, but does not give up his wish to marry Sita. Though Mandodari considers Sita inferior to her in beauty and ancestry, Mandodari acknowledges Sita's devotion to Rama and compares her to goddesses like Sachi and Rohini.

== During the war ==
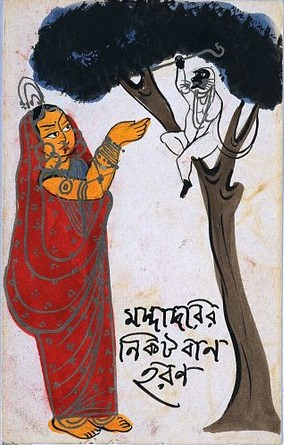
Hanuman steals from Mandodari the weapon that leads to Ravana's death

When all attempts for a peaceful return of Sita fail, Rama declares war on Ravana's Lanka. Before the final battle against Rama, Mandodari makes a last attempt to dissuade Ravana, but to no avail. Finally, Mandodari stands by her husband in the final battle like an obedient and faithful wife, though she advises her son Meghanada, alias Indrajit ("One who had conquered Indra; the god-king of heaven"), not to fight Rama.

Several manuscripts of the Ramayana mention a story in which Angada drags Mandodari by her hair in presence of Ravana as a punishment for Ravana's treatment of Sita. Satyatirtha, a commentator on Ramayana, dismisses this story as spurious. According to this story: When all of Ravana's sons and warriors die, Ravana organizes a yajna ("fire sacrifice") to assure his victory. Rama sends a troop of monkeys headed by Hanuman and the monkey prince Angada to destroy this yajna. The monkeys create havoc in Ravana's palace, but Ravana continues the yajna. Angada drags Mandodari by her hair in front of Ravana. Mandodari pleads to her husband to save her and reminds him what Rama is doing for his wife. The enraged Ravana abandons the yajna and strikes Angada with his sword. With the yajna disturbed, Angada's purpose is served and he leaves Mandodari and escapes. Mandodari again implores Ravana to surrender Sita to Rama, but he refuses. Other Ramayana adaptations present more gruesome descriptions of the incident. The Krittivasi Ramayan narrates that the monkeys dragged Mandodari and tore off her clothes. In Bicitra Ramayana, it is Hanuman who humiliates Mandodari. The Thai adaptation Ramakien narrates that Hanuman sleeps with Mandodari in the form of Ravana and destroys her chastity, which protects Ravana's life.

Ravana fights the final duel with Rama. Rama fails to kill Ravana with his ordinary arrows, but finally kills with a magical arrow. While Valmiki's Ramayana narrates that the magical arrow was given to Rama by Indra, in other versions the magical arrow is hidden in Mandodari's bed chambers or under her bed. While Mandodari is engrossed in worshipping the goddess Parvati for Ravana's wellbeing, Hanuman comes to her disguised as a hermit. After winning her confidence, he tricks her into revealing the secret location of the arrow. Hanuman seizes the arrow and gives it to Rama, leading to Ravana's end. Mandodari appears at the death scene of Ravana in a disarrayed state and laments his death. In this battle, Mandodari loses her husband, her sons and her kinsmen.

== Remarriage to Vibhishana ==
While the Ramayana of Valmiki is silent on Mandodari's fate after Ravana's death, many versions of Ramayana state that after the death of Ravana, Rama advises Vibhishana to take Mandodari as his wife, even though he already had a wife. A theory suggests that Ravana's race may have had matrilineal families and thus, to restore order in the kingdom after Ravana's death, it was necessary for Vibhishana to marry the reigning queen to get the right to rule. Another theory suggests it may be a non-Aryan custom to marry the reigning queen. The marriage between Mandodari and Vibhishana is purely an "act of statesmanship", rather than a marriage based on their "mutual sexual interference". Mandodari may have agreed to marry Vibhishana, her younger brother-in-law, as this would lead the kingdom to prosperity and stability as allies of Rama's Ayodhya, and she would continue to have a say in governance. Another reason for the marriage is as an alternative to suicide for the widowed Mandodari, which is averted by Rama.

== Mother of Sita ==
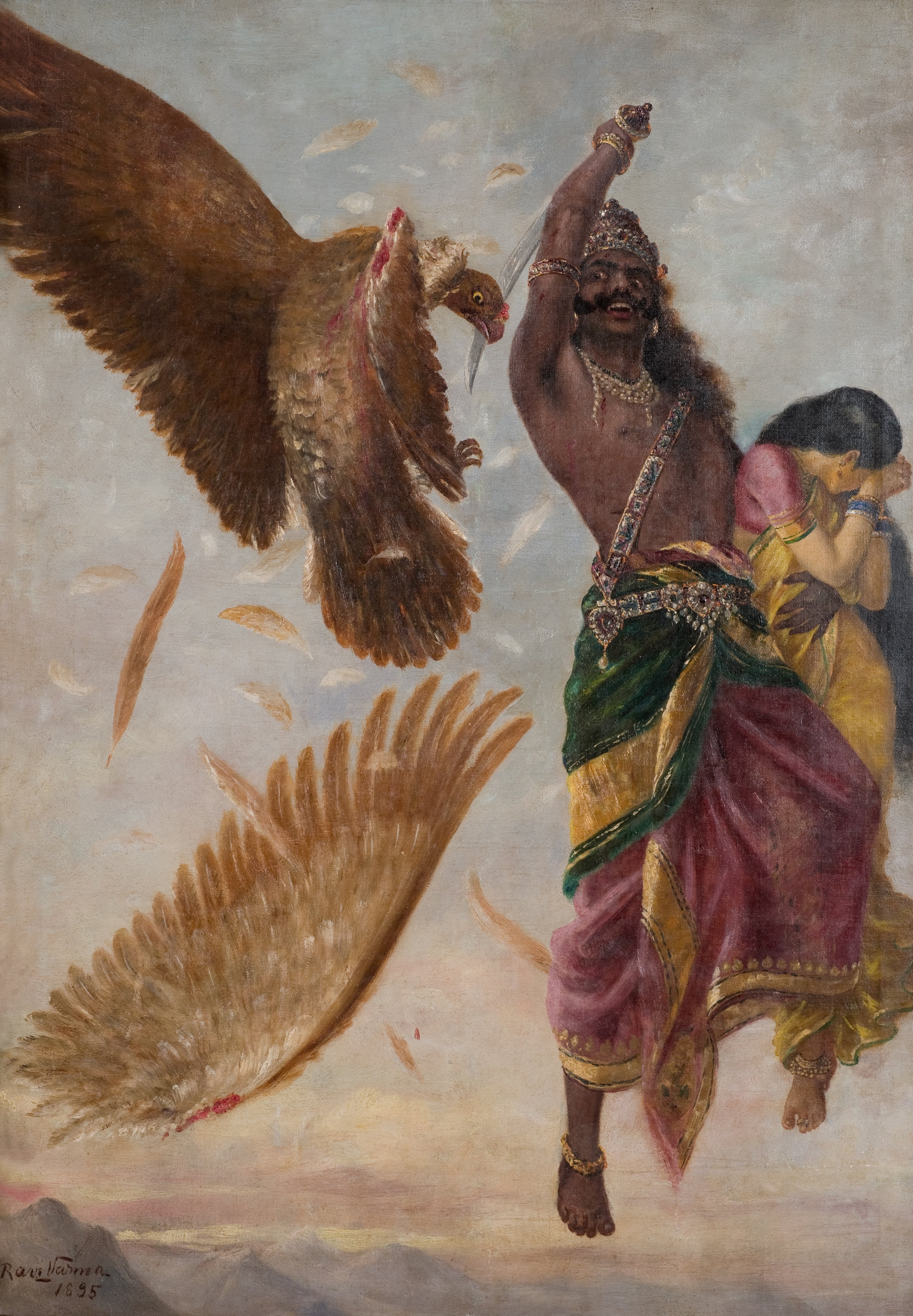
Ravana abducts Rama's wife, Sita. According to some Ramayana adaptations, Ravana was abducting his own daughter from a union with Mandodari.

Though Valmiki's Ramayana does not record Mandodari as being the mother of Sita, some later adaptations of the Ramayana depict Mandodari as the mother of Sita or at least the cause of the latter's birth.

The Adbhuta Ramayana narrates: Ravana used to store the blood of sages he killed in a large pot. The sage Gritsamada was practicing penance to acquire the goddess Lakshmi as his daughter. He stored milk from Darbha grass and purified it with mantras in a pot so that Lakshmi would inhabit it. Ravana poured the milk from this pot into his blood pot. Mandodari is frustrated seeing the evil deeds of Ravana, so she decides to commit suicide by drinking the contents of the blood-pot, which is described to be more poisonous than poison. Instead of dying, Mandodari gets pregnant with the incarnation of Lakshmi due to the power of Gritsamada's milk. Mandodari buries the foetus in Kurukshetra, where it is discovered by Janaka, who named her Sita.

The Devi Bhagavata Purana says: When Ravana wants to marry Mandodari, Maya warns him that her horoscope indicated her first-born would destroy her clan and should be killed. Ignoring Maya's advice, Ravana buries his first child by Mandodari in a casket in Janaka’s city, where it is discovered and grew up as Sita. Jain adaptations of the Ramayana like Vasudevahindi, Uttara-purana, and others also state that Sita is the daughter of Ravana and Mandodari, and is abandoned when she is prophesied to be the cause of the end of Ravana and his family.

In the Malay Seri Rama and the Indonesian-Javanese Rama Keling, Ravana wants to possess Mandodari, the mother of Rama, but instead marries a pseudo-Mandodari, who looks like the real one. Rama's father has a union with this pseudo-Mandodari, resulting in the birth of Sita, who is nominally Ravana's daughter.

According to the Ananda Ramayana, king Padmaksha had a daughter named Padma - an incarnate of the goddess Lakshmi. When her marriage is organized, Rakshasas (demons) kill the king. The grief-stricken Padma jumps into fire. Ravana discovers her body, which had turned into five jewels, in the fire and takes it to Lanka sealed in a box. Mandodari opens the box and finds Padma inside it. She advises Ravana to cast off the box containing the ill-fated Padma, who led to the doom of her father. When the lid of the box is closed, Padma curses Ravana that she will return to Lanka and cause his doom. Ravana buries the box in the city of Janaka, who discovers Padma and brings her up as Sita.

== Assessment ==
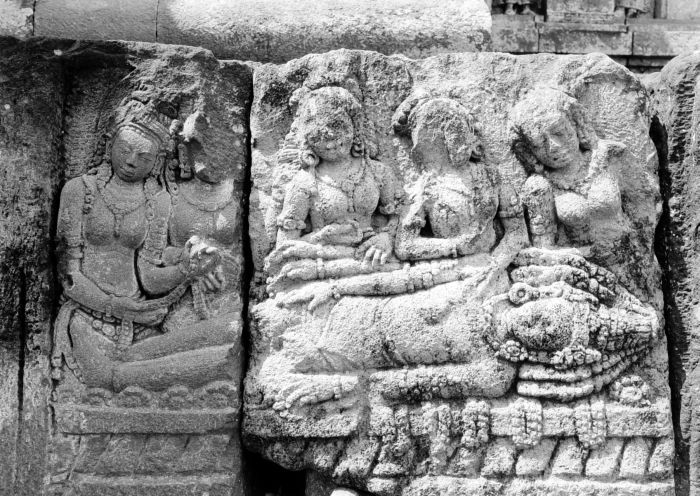
Queen Mandodari and the women of Lanka mourning the death of Ravana. She brings a flower garland to lay upon her husband's body which rests on cremation wood. Bas-relief of 9th century Prambanan temple, Java, Indonesia.

Ahalyā draupadi sita tārā mandodari tathā
pañcakanyā smarenityaṃ mahapātaka nāśanaṃ
Remembering ever the five goddess-Ahalya, Draupadi, Sita, Tara and Mandodari
Destroys the greatest of sins.

Hindus remember the panchakanya - the five maidens in this daily prayer, though none of them is considered an ideal woman who could be emulated. Mandodari, with Ahalya, Sita and Tara, belong to the Ramayana, while Draupadi is from the Mahabharata. Among the five elements, Mandodari is equated to water, "turbulent on the surface and deep in her spiritual quest". The writer Dhanalakshmi Ayyer says:

Her story is a reminder that the universal denigration of a group, based on the behaviour of a few, cannot cloud the greatness of the individual. Mandodari defies the stereotype of this racism. She is simple, unswerving, and self-effacing, driven by the light of knowledge which gives meaning to solid materialism in an age that is shrouded by impulse, passion, and desire. She is the instrument that awakens the mind and counsels reason when irrationality becomes the core being. That she goes unheard and unheeded does not change her path. To her, the dharmic part is inward-looking, while the role of the dutiful wife is the external self. Mandodari thought that her duty to her husband on issues of morals and values ended with her telling him what she thought of his actions. She neither put up any brave fight to stop him nor considered it her duty to do so.

Mandodari's role is short in the Ramayana but very important. She is described as a pious and righteous royal lady. Compared to the rest of the panchakanya, Mukherjee considers Mandodari's life as "less colourful and eventful". He adds: "Mandodari seldom got prominence ... Her image lacks substance and fades quickly", though he lays stress on her love and loyalty towards her husband. Pradip Bhattacharya, author of the book Panchkanya: Women of Substance notes that "there is hardly anything special that Valmiki (Ramayana) has written about her (Mandodari) except that she warns her husband to return Sita and has enough influence to prevent his [sic] raping her."

== In popular culture ==
In 2026, Mandodari was portrayed by Kajal Aggarwal in the Hindi film, Ramayana: Part 1.
