= Tara (Ramayana) =

Queen of Kishkindha and wife of the vanara king Vali in the Ramayana

- Member of Panchakanya
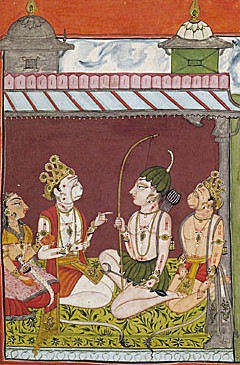
- Lakshmana Meets with Tara (leftmost), Sugriva (2nd from left) and Hanuman (rightmost) in the Palace of Kishkinda
- Other names: Tārā
- Devanagari: तारा
- Affiliation: Vanara/Apsara, Panchakanya
- Abode: Kishkindha

Genealogy
- Parents: Sushena (father)
- Consort: Vali
- Children: Angada

In the Hindu epic Ramayana, Tara (Sanskrit: तारा, Tārā, lit. 'star') is the Queen of Kishkindha and the wife of the vanara (monkey) King Vali.

Tara is described as the daughter of the vanara physician Sushena in the Ramayana, and in later sources, as an apsara (celestial nymph) who rises from the churning of the milky ocean. She marries Vali and bears him a son named Angada. After Vali is presumed dead in a battle with a demon, his brother Sugriva becomes king, however, Vali returns and exiles his brother, accusing him of treachery.

When Sugriva challenges Vali to a duel, Tara wisely advises Vali not to accept because of the former's alliance with Rama—the hero of the Ramayana and an avatar of the god Vishnu—but Vali does not heed her, and dies from Rama's arrow, shot at the behest of Sugriva. The Ramayana and its later adaptations emphasize Tara's lamentation. While in most vernacular versions, Tara casts a curse on Rama by the power of her chastity, in some versions, Rama enlightens Tara.

Sugriva returns to the throne but spends his time carousing and fails to act on his promise to assist Rama in recovering his kidnapped wife, Sita. Tara now, chief diplomat—is then instrumental in reconciling Rama with Sugriva after pacifying Lakshmana, Rama's brother, who was about to destroy Kishkinda in retribution for Sugriva's perceived treachery. After this incident, Tara is only mentioned in passing references, as the story moves from Kishkindha to the climactic battle in Lanka to retrieve Sita.

Tara's intelligence, presence of mind, courage and devotion to her husband Vali is praised. She is extolled as one of the panchakanya (five [revered] women), the recital of whose names is believed to dispel sin.

== Birth and early life ==
In the Ramayana, Tara is addressed by Vali as the daughter of the vanara physician Sushena. Some versions of the Bala Kanda (the first book of the Ramayana), include verses describing principal monkeys created by various deities. Vali and Sugriva are described as sons of the king of the gods, Indra and the sun-god Surya respectively; while Tara is described as the daughter of Brihaspati, the guru of the gods. The 12th century Tamil Ramavataram and the Telugu Ranganatha Ramayanam state that Tara and Ruma rose, along with other apsaras, from the ocean of milk during its churning by the gods and the demons, to acquire the elixir of life (amrita). In the Theyyam drama tradition of Kerala, the gods tire and request Vali to help in the churning. When Vali just starts churning, Tara rises from the ocean and thus is gifted to Vali.

According to the Javanese wayang puppet tradition, Tara (Dewi Tara) is the apsara daughter of Indra and his wife Wiyati. Her siblings include a sister called Dewi Tari, the consort of the demon-king of Lanka, Ravana (Rahwana) and brothers Citarata, Citragana, Jayantaka, Jayantara, and Harjunawangsa.

While the Ramayana states that Tara first weds Vali, some Ramayana adaptations sometimes present a polyandrous relationship between Tara, Vali and Sugriva. The Ranganatha Ramayana states that Tara is given to Vali and Sugriva as a reward for helping the gods. A Tamil folk tale tells that after the amrita emerged, Tara rises and is given as a common wife to both Vali and Sugriva. In the Mahabharata, there is a reference to Vali and Sugriva fighting over an unnamed woman, who the mythologist Bhattacharya believes to be Tara.

Some Ramayana retellings including some Mahabharata versions, the Narasimha Purana and the Mahanataka portray Tara as originally Sugriva's wife that Vali snatched. The Thai Ramakien says that the gods give Vali and Sugriva a trident and Tara respectively, but Vali grabs Tara too and marries her. The Balinese dance Kebyar and the wayang tradition also tells that Tara was married to Sugriva (Sugriwa) initially, but appropriated by Vali (Subali).

In all versions, Angada is born from Tara's marriage to Vali.

In the Ramayana, Vali goes to fight the demon Mayavi in a cave and instructs Sugriva to close the door of the cave if blood flows out from the cave, implying that he has been killed, but if milk flows out, it indicates that Mayavi is dead. After a year of combat, the dying demon turns the colour of his milky blood to red by sorcery. Sugriva believes that Vali is dead and closes the only opening to the cave. Sugriva also appropriates—sometimes interpreted as marriage—Vali's "widow" Tara. After Vali returns, rejecting Sugriva's explanation, he exiles Sugriva and not only re-acquires Tara but also seizes Ruma, Sugriva's wife, in retaliation. While Vali's act of usurping Ruma when her husband is alive is universally criticized by the Ramayana commentators, they excuse Sugriva's taking of Tara, as his wife, as he believed she was widowed.

In the wayang variant, Vali (Subali) goes to battle the demon brother-rulers of Kishkinda, Jatasura and Lembusura, in the cave. Similar to the Ramayana, Sugriva (Sugriwa) presumes Vali dead. The gods crown Sugriva the king of Kishkinda and grant him, Tara, as a reward for aiding his "dead" brother. Vali returns and instigated by Ravana, seizes Tara and the kingdom.

== Death of Vali ==
After his wife Sita is kidnapped by the demon-king Ravana, Rama and his brother Lakshmana wander the forest searching for her. Upon meeting the monkey-warrior Hanuman, they are taken to the exiled Sugriva. Rama forms an alliance with Sugriva, whom he will help; in order to defeat Vali and regain his wife Ruma and his kingship. In return, Sugriva will aid in the search for Sita. As agreed, Sugriva challenges Vali in the wrestling contest, but Rama is unable to distinguish between the two fighters and Sugriva loses the contest. Rama explains his predicament to Sugriva and tells him to re-challenge Vali, but this time, Rama garlands Sugriva to differentiate him from Vali.

=== Tara's warning ===
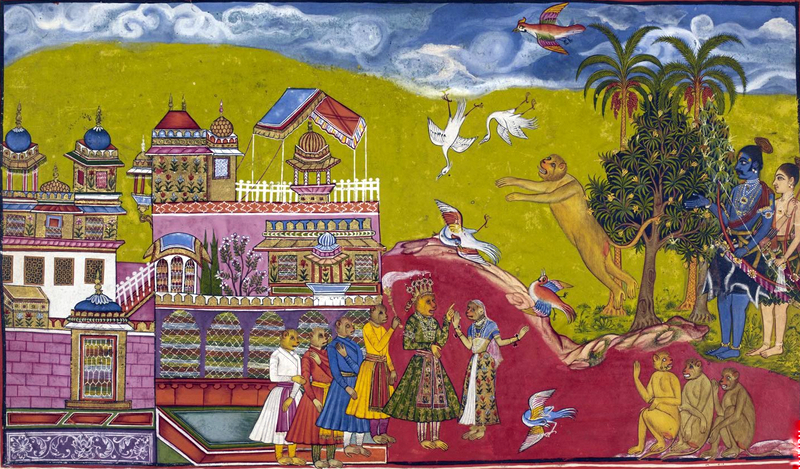
Tara dissuades Vali (centre), as Sugriva challenges him

In the Kishkindha Kanda of the Ramayana, when Sugriva re-challenges Vali for combat, Tara suggests that "appearances are deceptive" and normally, a combatant would not return so soon to a fight again after a decisive defeat. Having heard of the growing friendship between Sugriva and Rama, she cautions Vali. She urges him to forgive Sugriva, to anoint him as the crown prince, as a diplomatic move, and live peacefully with him, and also befriend the exalted Rama. Tara begs Vali to act on her advice, but acknowledging Tara's love and devotion, Vali argues that a warrior like him cannot refuse a challenge; despite this, he promises to not kill Sugriva, but just crush his pride.

In the Mahabharata retelling, when Sugriva re-challenges Vali, Tara dissuades Vali from going to the fight and points out that Sugriva may have found a protector. Tara, described as lustrous like the moon, is praised by Vali as one who understands the language of all creatures and is astute to clarify her statement. Tara warns him about Sugriva's alliance with Rama and the plotting of Vali's death at the hands of Sugriva and his advisers. Vali not only disregards Tara's advice but also suspects Tara of cheating on him with Sugriva. Vali leaves, speaking harshly to Tara.

In the Ramavataram, Tara warns about Rama's plans to kill Vali. However, Vali dismisses her warning as unfounded, arguing that Rama, a man of dharma, would not shoot him when he and Sugriva are in a duel. Vali leaves, promising Tara that he will slay Sugriva.

=== Tara's lamentation ===
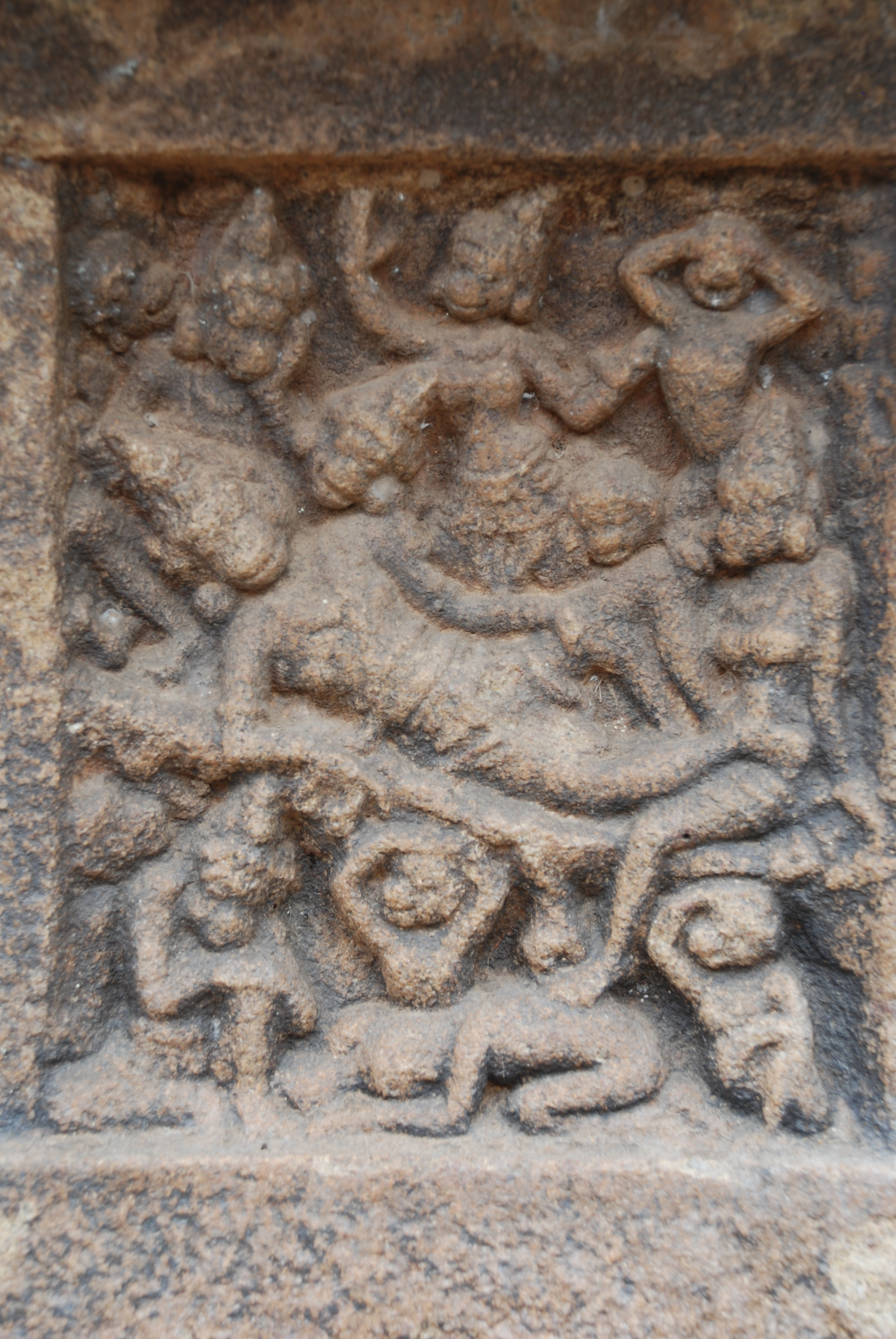
The miniature panel in the Tirupullamangai Temple, Pasupathikoil captures the scene of Valli's death. Tara, depicted with a monkey face, is seated at his feet, lamenting his death.

In the Bala Kanda Book of the Ramayana, where the whole work is summarized, the lamentation of Tara is mentioned as a significant event.

Ignoring Tara's sound advice, Vali engages in combat with Sugriva. While fighting, Rama shoots an arrow at Vali from behind, fatally wounding him. The news of Vali's death reaches Tara; she rushes to him with Angada. She sees monkeys running in terror on the way. They advise her to go back to the palace and consecrate Angada as the king. Tara refuses and says that she needs to see her husband first, leading them back to Vali. Embracing the dying Vali, Tara laments his death while reproaching Sugriva and Rama. Tara accepts Vali's death as punishment for seizing Ruma and exiling Sugriva.

In North Indian manuscripts of the Ramayana, some interpolations elaborate Tara's lament. Tara mentions the hardships of widowhood and prefers death to it. She blames Rama for unjustly killing Vali and tells him that if they had forged an alliance, Vali could have helped him recover Sita. Tara invokes the power of her chastity and curses Rama so that he will soon lose Sita after he regains her. She declares that Sita will return to the earth. The curse also appears in the North-western Indian manuscripts. In several vernacular adaptations of the Ramayana like the Oriya Vilanka Ramayana by Sarala Dasa, Tara's curse is reiterated. Apart from the usual curse to Rama of his separation from Sita, in the Bengali Krittivasi Ramayana, Tara additionally curses Rama that in his next birth, he will be killed by Vali. The Mahanataka and the Ananda Ramayana narrate that Vali is reborn as the hunter who kills Krishna, Rama's next birth.

Hanuman consoles Tara, telling her to look towards the future of her son, Angada. Hanuman suggests that Angada be consecrated as king, compensating her loss but Tara declares that since his uncle Sugriva is alive, it is inadvisable. With his last breath, Vali confesses his folly of abandoning Sugriva and urges Angada and Tara to support Sugriva. He declares that:

"Tara is ... thoroughly knowledgeable about deciding subtle matters and about various portents. Whatever she says is right should be done without doubt, for nothing Tara believes turns out to be otherwise."

Vali requests Rama to take care that Tara is not insulted and advises Sugriva to unquestioningly follow her advice.

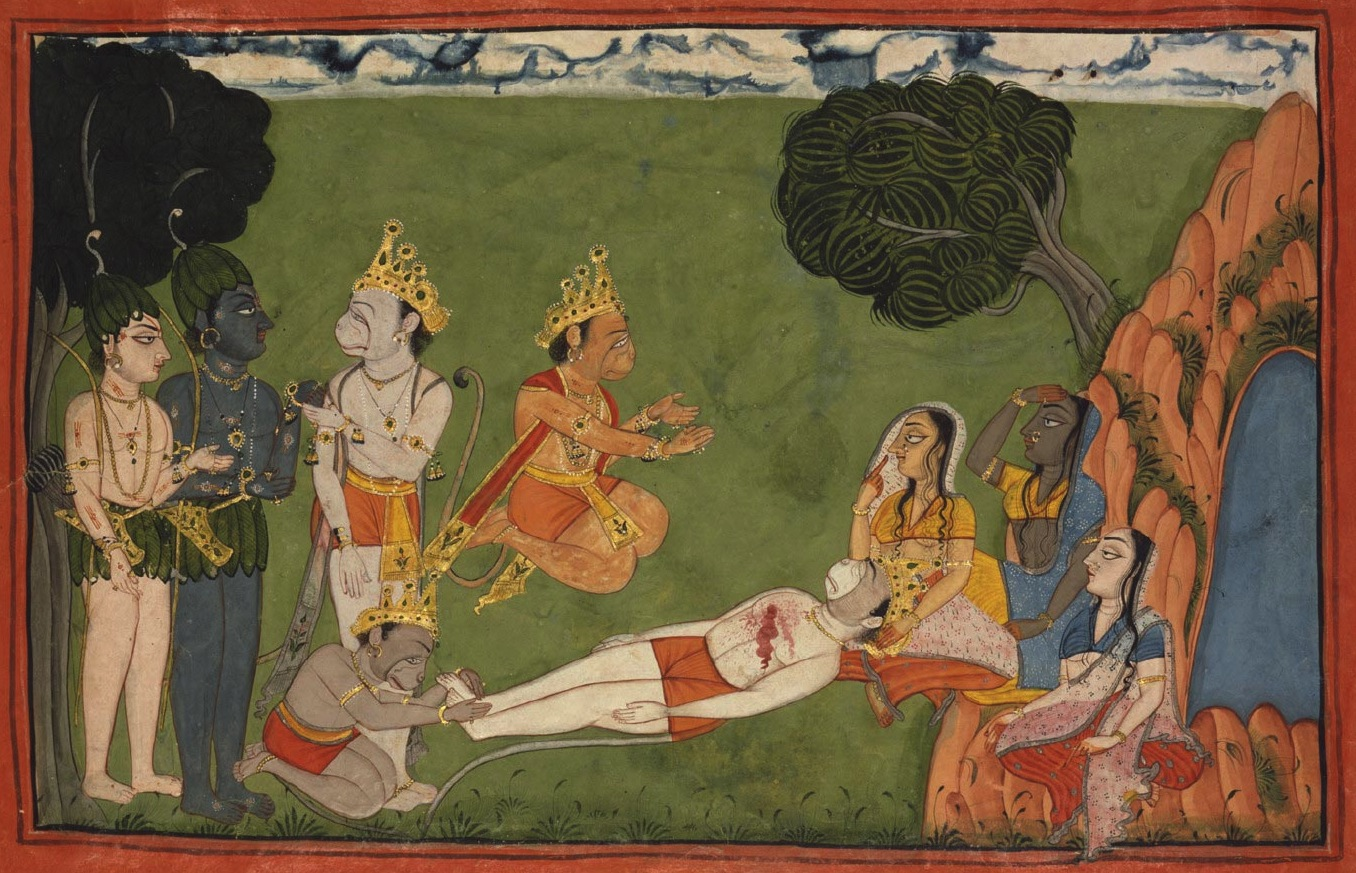
Tara (right), depicted as a human, wailing with dying Vali in her arms

Vali dies in the embraces of Tara, who mourns his death in a painful and rebuking speech. According to Lefeber, Tara's lament has been significantly expanded, if not added completely, over the centuries. In South Indian manuscripts, some later interpolations elaborate Tara's lament, in which Tara asks Rama to kill her and lead her to Vali. Rama consoles Tara, saying that she should accept the preordained destiny. Rama guarantees her that her rights and those of Angada will be protected and that she will enjoy "continued comfort". He tells her that a wife of a hero should not hold personal sorrow.

In the Adhyatma Ramayana, while Tara wails over the death of Vali, Rama preaches to her, saying that the body is ephemeral, while only the soul is eternal; he tells her she should not grieve over the decay of Vali's body. Tara questions him asking "if the body is destructible, why does one feel pleasure and pain". Rama informs her that due to ahamkara (egoism) the mind is chained in bondage to desires. He declares that Tara will remain untouched by karma and be emancipated from the bondage of life. Having heard his sermon, and because she had been devoted to him in a previous birth, Tara thus becomes free of egoism and undergoes self-realization. This discourse of Rama also appears in Tulsidas's Ramacharitamanasa, but it is curtailed to just two verses and is possibly borrowed from the former text. Rama says that the body is perishable, but the soul is immortal and listening to this, the enlightened Tara bows to Rama and gains the boon of supreme devotion.

A Ramayana version portrays her as trying to stabilize the kingdom after Vali's death in her arms. She declares that "With his last breath, King Vali begs you, his faithful subjects, to follow his brother [Sugriva] as your rightful king." Angada cremates Vali, aided in the funeral rites by Tara and Sugriva.

== Marriage to Sugriva ==
After Vali's death, Sugriva acquires Vali's kingdom as well as Tara. The Ramayana does not record any formal marriage or any ritual purification—like the trial by fire Sita had to undergo when she is reacquired by Rama from Ravana—that Tara must undertake to marry Sugriva or return to Vali following his return from the dead. The lack of the description of formal marriage suggests, according to some critics, that Tara's relationship to Sugriva is neither widow re-marriage nor polyandry, but simply appropriation by Sugriva. In the references of the coronation of Sugriva as king, Angada is also described as the heir-apparent crown prince, while Tara is mentioned as Sugriva's wife. The Adhyatma Ramayana declares that Sugriva acquires Tara.

While Vali's acquisition of Ruma— elder brother taking his younger sister-in-law as a wife—is universally condemned; however as in Tara's case, the elder brother's widow marrying her younger brother-in-law seems to be a social norm. Ramashraya Sharma considers that Rama's silence on the marriage of Tara and Sugriva does not signal non-acceptance of the act, but rather that he is not concerned with the issue of the sexual relations of the loose charactered vanaras, in which Tara and Ruma exchange hands between the brothers. The Ramayana mentions that Sugriva indulges in sexual pleasures of women, including Ruma and Tara, who he coveted. In the Ramayana however, Angada criticizes Sugriva for his lustful marriage to his elder sister-in-law Tara, who is like a mother to him. Though a political marriage, Tara serves Sugriva loyally.

The commentaries of the Ramayana suggest that it would be right for Sugriva to marry the widowed Tara. The Amritakataka of Kataka Madhava Yogindra says that this was right as they were animals. The Tilaka by Nahesh Bhatt(Ramavarma) justifies Sugriva's marriage to Tara since Sugriva was her dead husband's brother. It further states that Tara should remarry as she did not belong to the first three castes and was young. Tara's action of taking Sugriva as her husband after Vali's death is seen as her attempt to secure the futures of Angada and the kingdom.

In some rare instances like in the Ramavataram, Tara does not remarry. Sugriva treats her as a mother figure and salutes her.

== Tara pacifies Lakshmana ==
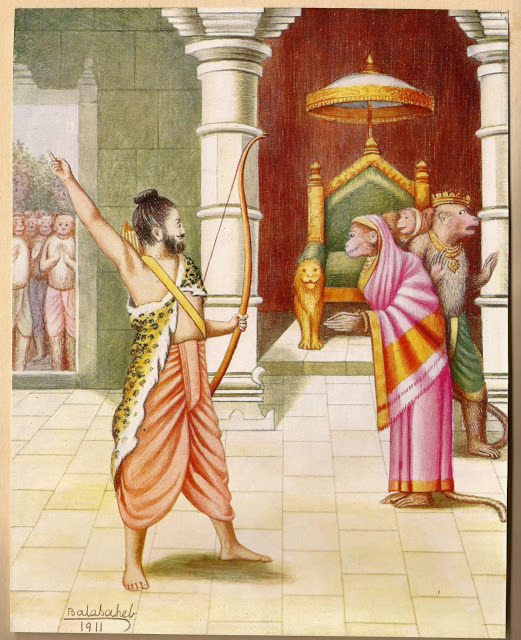
Tara pacifies an angry Lakshmana, as a frightened Sugriva hides behind her.

The rainy season ensues and ends and Rama in despair fears that Sugriva has forgotten his promise to help him trace and recover Sita. Rama sends Lakshmana to Kishkindha to remind the complacent monarch of his promise to help. Irritated that the city is barricaded, Lakshmana kicks down the city gate and threatens to destroy Sugriva and the monkey kingdom with his divine power. Lakshmana is unable to tolerate Sugriva breaking his vow to Rama, enjoying material and sensual pleasures, while Rama suffers alone.

When the agitated Lakshamana—reaching the inner chambers of Sugriva and his harem—reproaches Sugriva for being ungrateful to Rama and forgetting his promise, the critical edition of the Ramayana states that Tara voluntarily intervenes to calm the wrath of Lakshmana. In some Ramayana adaptations and North-western Indian manuscripts of the Ramayana, it is Tara, not Ruma in whom Sugriva is engrossed when Lakshmana arrives. The South Indian manuscripts portray the drunk Sugriva, who is engrossed in lustful revel as being ignorant of Lakshmana's anger and sending Tara to pacify him, in some versions, even though she is drunk. Though intoxicated with "half-closed eyes and unsteady gait", Tara manages to disarm Lakshmana. The intoxication of Tara is also described in the original Ramayana, but in a different context. Tara is described as having made it a habit to visit Sugriva always in a tipsy state, before indulging in the "new pleasures of love".

The Ramayana narrates: Tara says that Sugriva is mindful that through Rama, Sugriva has gained the kingship, Ruma and herself. She defends Sugriva saying that even great sage Vishwamitra was tempted by pleasure, Sugriva—a mere forest-dwelling monkey—is fatigued by his past hardships and is relaxing, but not partaking in carnal pleasures. Tara informs Sugriva that Vali told her that Ravana is a mighty king with several rakshasas in his service. She reminds Lakshmana that without an ally like Sugriva, Rama cannot defeat such a powerful foe. Tara informs him that Sugriva has summoned all monkey commanders and troops to the capital. The Adhyatma Ramayana also presents a similar description, where Tara, Angada and Hanuman are sent by Sugriva to calm Lakshmana. In a condensed one-verse description, the Ramacharitamanasa says that Tara and Hanuman were dispatched by Sugriva and were successful in appeasing Lakshmana by singing Rama's praises. In the Ramavataram, though not Sugriva's consort, Tara pacifies Lakshamana. The usual epithet of Tara, lustrous as the moon, in the Ramavataram, signifies her white clothes, the sign of a widow. Lakshmana is reminded of his own widowed mother seeing Tara.

Pacified by Tara and praised further by Sugriva, Lakshmana begs for Sugriva's pardon for abusing him. It is only through the diplomatic intervention of Tara that the crisis is averted.

== Commentary ==
Ahalya Draupadi Sita Tara Mandodari tatha
panchakanya smare nityam mahapataka nashanam

Remembering ever the virgins five -Ahalya, Draupadi, Sita, Tara and Mandodari
Destroys the greatest of sins.

Hindus remember Panchakanya: the five virgins or maidens, in this daily morning prayer. Ahalya, Mandodari, Sita, and Tara, belong to the Ramayana, while Draupadi is from the Mahabharata.

V. R. Devika, author of Tara: Unsung heroine describes her as a woman "treated like an equal and her opinion mattered as if she were one of the lieutenants." Ramayana presents Tara as a woman, intensely loved and respected by Vali, her husband. Her regard is so great that her counsel to Vali sometimes has a commanding tone. Pradip Bhattacharya, author of the book Panchkanya: Women of Substance describes Tara as "a woman of unusual intelligence, foresight and confidence." Tara's devotion to her husband is also praised.
