= Sushena =

Epithet of Vishnu

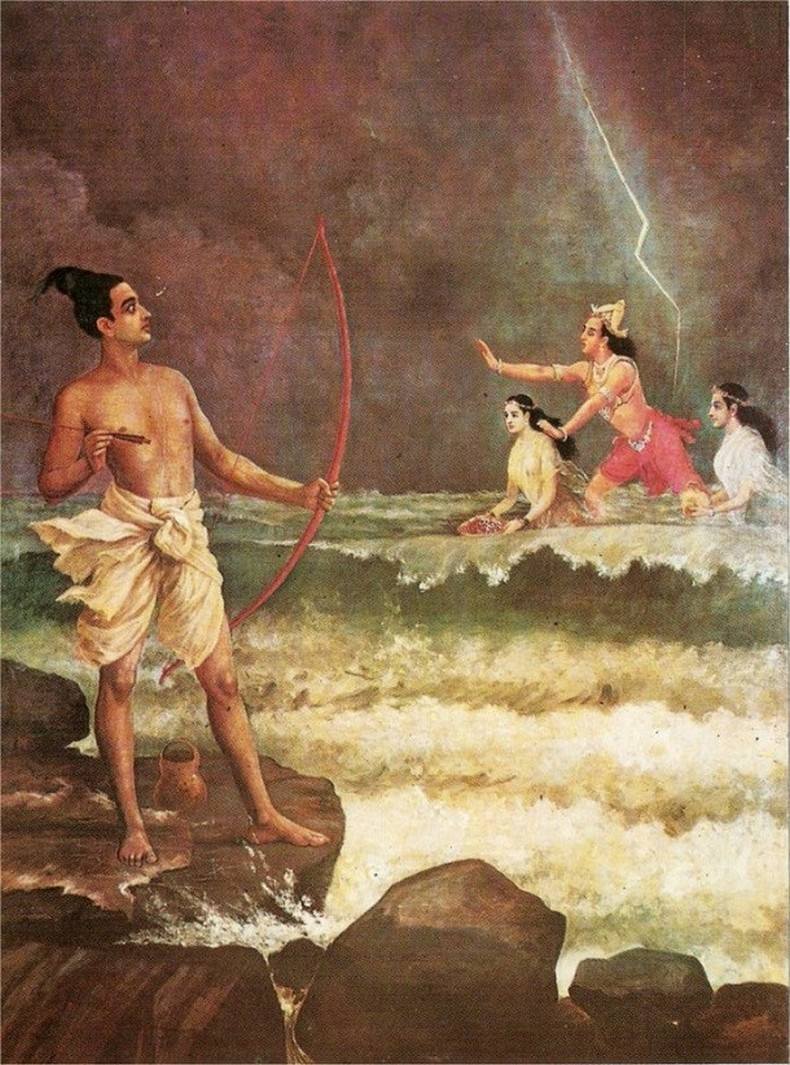
Raja Ravi Varma Painting – 'Rama Conquers Varuna'

Sushen (IAST: Suṣhēn; lit. 'sacred army') is an epithet of Vishnu, cited in the epic Hindu hymn Vishnu Sahasranama (The thousand names of Vishnu). Several characters described in the Hindu texts also have the name Sushena.

== Literature ==
Stanza 58 of the Vishnu Sahasranama contains the name suṣhēnah:

mahāvarāho govindạh suṣhēnah kanakāngade
guhyo gabhēro gahanọ guptaśchakragadādharah

The Advaita philosopher Adi Shankaracharya wrote a definitive Sanskrit commentary on the Sahasranama in the eighth century CE, which has been particularly influential for many schools of Hinduism. His commentary on Stanza 58 included: "Suṣhēnah – He who has a charming army. The army of Vishnu is called as His Ganā. They are mainly constituted of great sages and seers and hence, their compelling enchantment."

In the 13th century CE, Parasara Bhattar wrote a commentary in Tamil on Vishnu Sahasranama from a Vaishnavite viewpoint, giving the opinion that Bhagavan (Vishnu) has a body that is pure suddha-sattva, and the constituents of this pure body are like an army that can win over the jivas (nitya-muktas and baddha-muktas) and make them join him in mutual enjoyment of bliss.

== Other uses ==
- Sushena was a son of Karna, one of the central characters of the Mahābhārata. He was a great car-warrior who fought in the Kurukshetra war, and defeated many warriors, but was finally killed by Nakula, one of the Pandava brothers, on the final day of the war.
- Sushena (सुषेन) was a vanara chief at the siege of Lanka, when Rama formed an alliance with the vanara king Sugriva, who placed an army of vanaras at Rama's disposal.
- Another Sushena mentioned in the Mahābhārata was the able brother of Emperor Janamejaya, son of Maharaja Parikshit, of the Kuru kingdom.
- The Raja Vaidya (Royal Doctor) of Ravana's Kingdom was named Sushena, with the 'na' – the ending na of 'ta-kara' in the varnamala of the Devanagari script.
- During the battle against Ravana, Lakshmana was struck by the powerful arrow of Indrajit and became unconscious.
- Sushena examined Lakshmana and advised bringing the Sanjeevani Booti, a rare life-saving herb from the Himalayas.
- Sushena continued to help Rama’s army by treating wounded warriors and advising strategies.
