= Vanara =

Characters of Hindu epic Ramayana

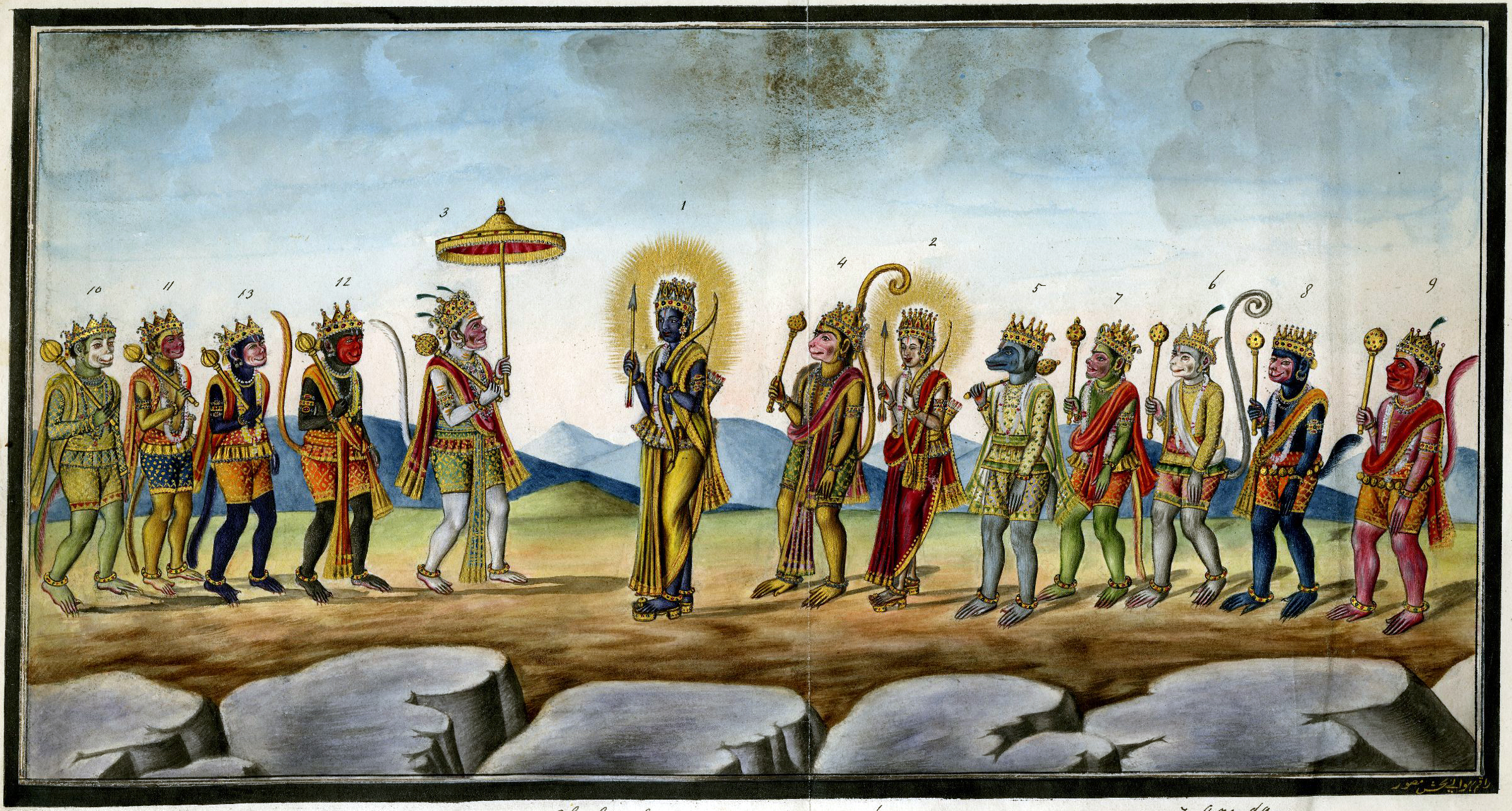
Rama and Vanara chiefs

In Hinduism, Vanara (Sanskrit: वानर, lit. 'forest-dwellers') are either monkeys, apes, or a race of forest-dwelling people.

In the epic the Ramayana, the Vanaras help Rama defeat Ravana. They are generally depicted as humanoid apes, or human-like beings.

== Etymology ==
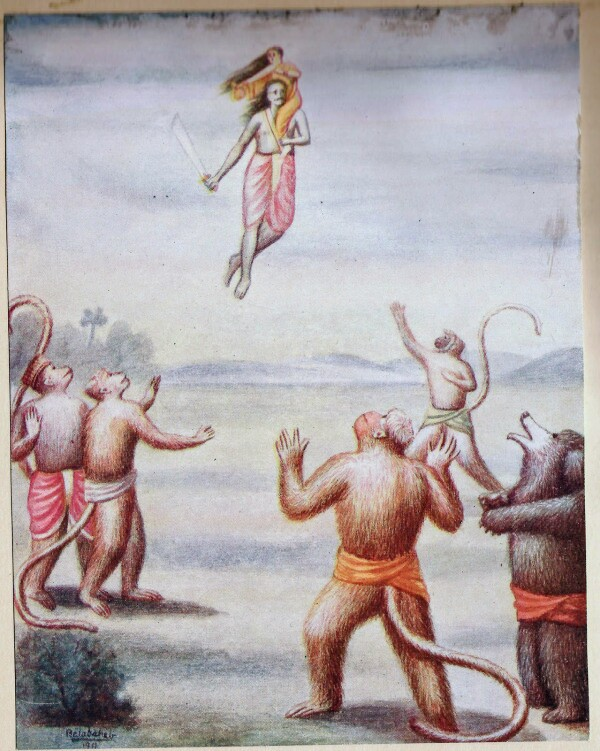
When Ravana carried Sita first on his shoulders and then in the chariot, she threw some of her jewels towards the monkeys

There are three main theories about the etymology of the word "Vanara":

- Aiyanar suggests that vanara means "monkey" derived from the word vana ("forest"), Literally meaning "belonging to the forest" Monier-Williams says it is probably derived from vanar (lit. "wandering in the forest") and means "forest-animal" or monkey.
- Devdutt Pattanaik suggests that it derives from the words vana ("forest"), and nara ("man"), thus meaning "forest man" and suggests that they may not be monkeys, which is the general meaning.
- It may be derived from the words vav and nara, meaning "is it a man?" (meaning "monkey") or "perhaps he is man".

== Identification ==
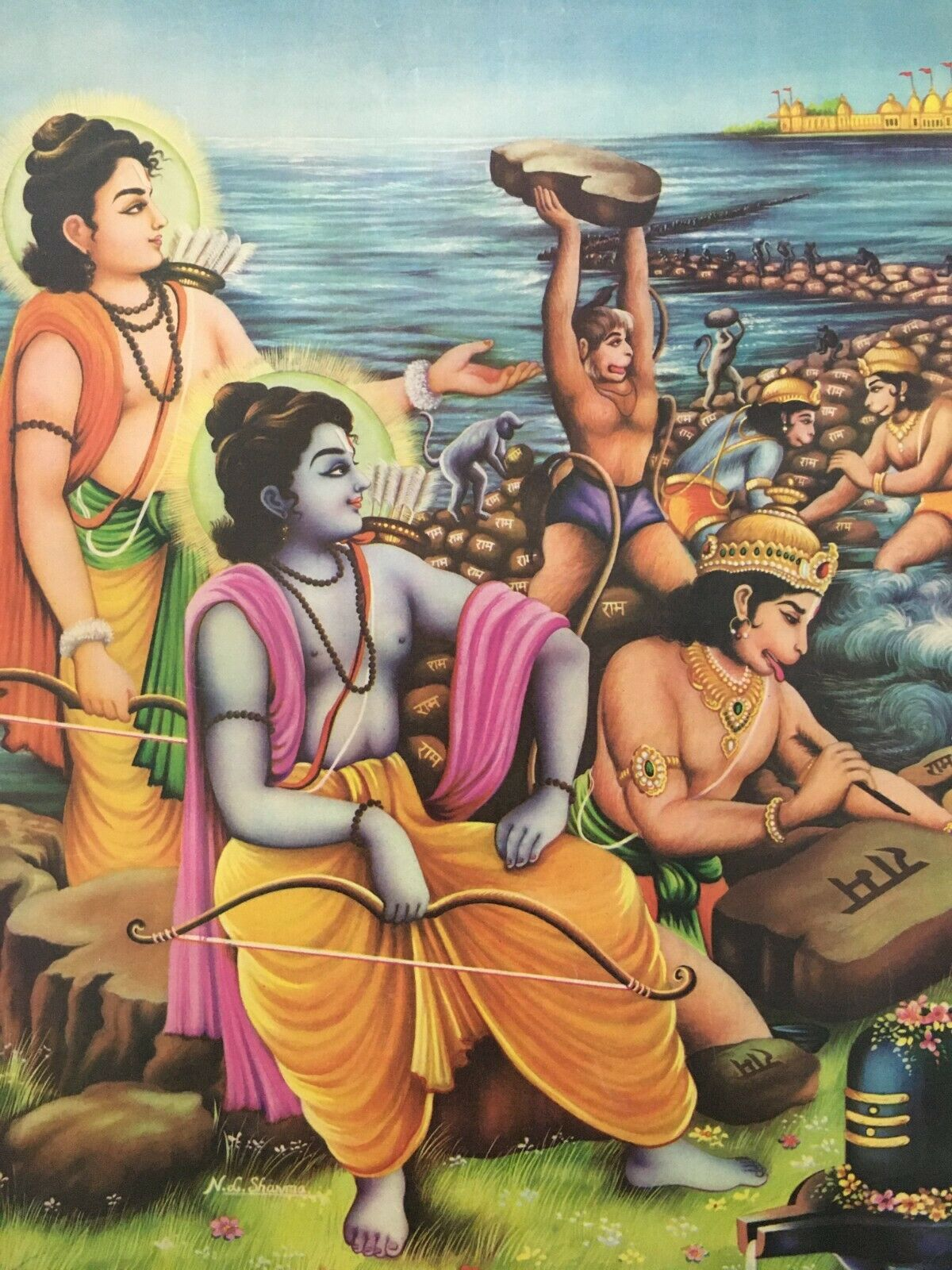
A 20th-century painting depicting a scene from the Ramayana, in which Vanaras are building a bridge to Lanka.

Although the word Vanara has come to mean "monkey" over the years and the Vanaras are depicted as monkeys in the popular art, their exact identity is not clear. According to the Ramayana, Vanaras were shapeshifters. In the Vanara form, they had beards with extended sideburns, narrowly shaved chin gap, and no moustache. They had a tail and razor-sharp claws. Their skin and skeleton were reinforced with an indestructible Vajra, which no earthly element could penetrate. Unlike other exotic creatures such as the rakshasas, the Vanaras do not have a precursor in the Vedic literature. The Ramayana presents them as humans with reference to their speech, clothing, habitations, funerals, weddings, consecrations etc. It also describes their monkey-like characteristics such as their leaping, hair, fur and a tail. Aiyanagar suggests that though the poet of the Ramayana may have known that vanaras were actually forest-dwelling people, he may portrayed them as real monkeys with supernatural powers and many of them as amsas (portions) of the gods to make the epic more "fantastic".

According to one theory, the Vanaras are semi-divine creatures. This is based on their supernatural abilities, as well as descriptions of Brahma commanding other deities to either bear Vanara offspring or incarnate as Vanaras to help Rama in his mission. The Jain re-tellings of Ramayana describe them as a clan of the supernatural beings called the Vidyadharas; the flag of this clan bears monkeys as emblems.

G. Ramdas, based on Ravana's reference to the Vanaras' tail as an ornament, infers that the "tail" was actually an appendage in the dress worn by the men of the Savara tribe. (The female Vanaras are not described as having a tail.) According to this theory, the non-human characteristics of the Vanaras may be considered artistic imagination. In Sri Lanka, the word "Vanara" has been used to describe the Nittaewos mentioned in the Vedda legends.

== In the Ramayana ==
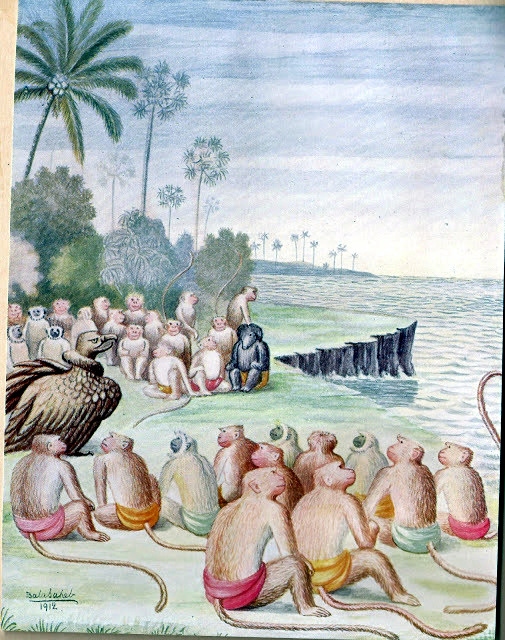
Sampati meeting with Vanaras painted by Balasaheb Pandit Pant Pratinidhi

Vanaras are created by Brahma to help Rama in battle against Ravana. They are powerful and have many godly traits. Taking Brahma's orders, the gods began to parent sons in the zion of Kishkindha (identified with parts of present-day Karnataka, Andhra Pradesh, and Maharashtra). Rama first met them in Dandaka Forest, during his search for Sita. An army of Vanaras helped Rama in his search for Sita, and also in battle against Ravana, Sita's abductor. Nala and Nila built a bridge over the ocean so that Rama and the army could cross to Lanka. As described in the epic, the characteristics of the Vanara include being amusing, childish, mildly irritating, badgering, hyperactive, adventurous, bluntly honest, loyal, courageous, and kind.

== Other texts ==
The Vanaras also appear in other texts, including Mahabharata. The epic Mahabharata describes them as forest-dwelling, and mentions their being encountered by Sahadeva, the youngest Pandava.

== Shapeshifting ==
In the Ramayana, the Vanara Hanuman changes shape several times. For example, while he searches for the kidnapped Sita in Ravana's palaces on Lanka, he contracts himself to the size of a cat, so that he will not be detected by the enemy. Later on, he takes on the size of a mountain, blazing with radiance, to show his true power to Sita.

== Notable Vanaras ==
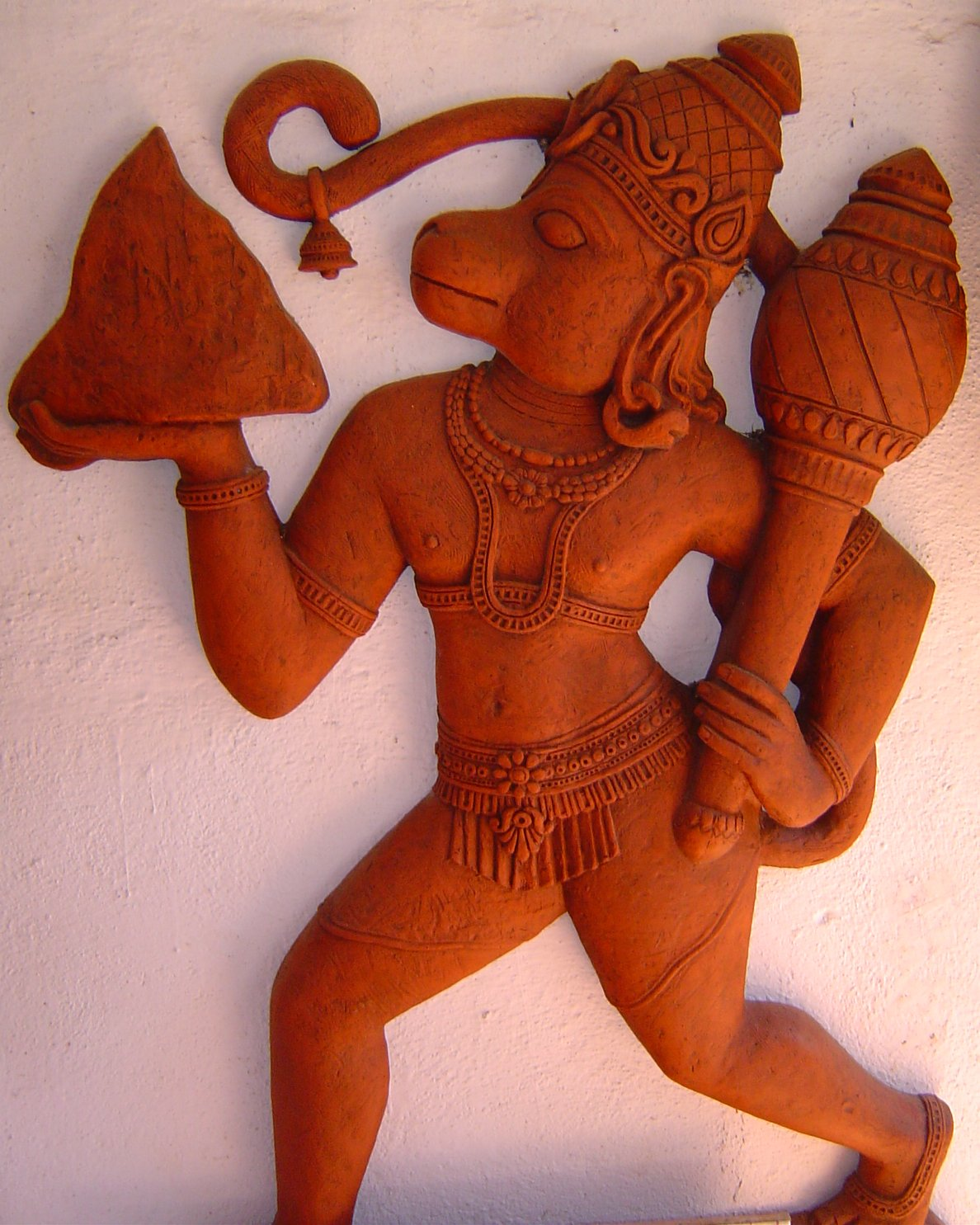
Sculpture of Hanuman, a warrior among the Vanaras, carrying the Dronagiri mountain

- Angada, son of Vali, successor of Sugriva, who helped Rama find his wife Sita
- Anjana, Hanuman's mother
- Hanuman, devotee of the god Rama and son of Vayu
- Kesari, Hanuman's father
- Mainda and Dvivida, sons of Ashvins
- Macchanu, son of Hanuman (per the Cambodian and Thai versions)
- Makardhwaja, son of Hanuman (per the Indian versions)
- Nala, son of Vishwakarma
- Nila, son of Agni
- Rumā, wife of Sugriva
- Sharabha, son of Parjanya
- Sugriva, king of Kishkindha, son of Surya
- Sushena, son of Varuna
- Taar, son of Brihaspati
- Tara, wife of Vali
- Vali, Sugriva's brother and son of Indra
