= Angada =

Son of Vali and Tara

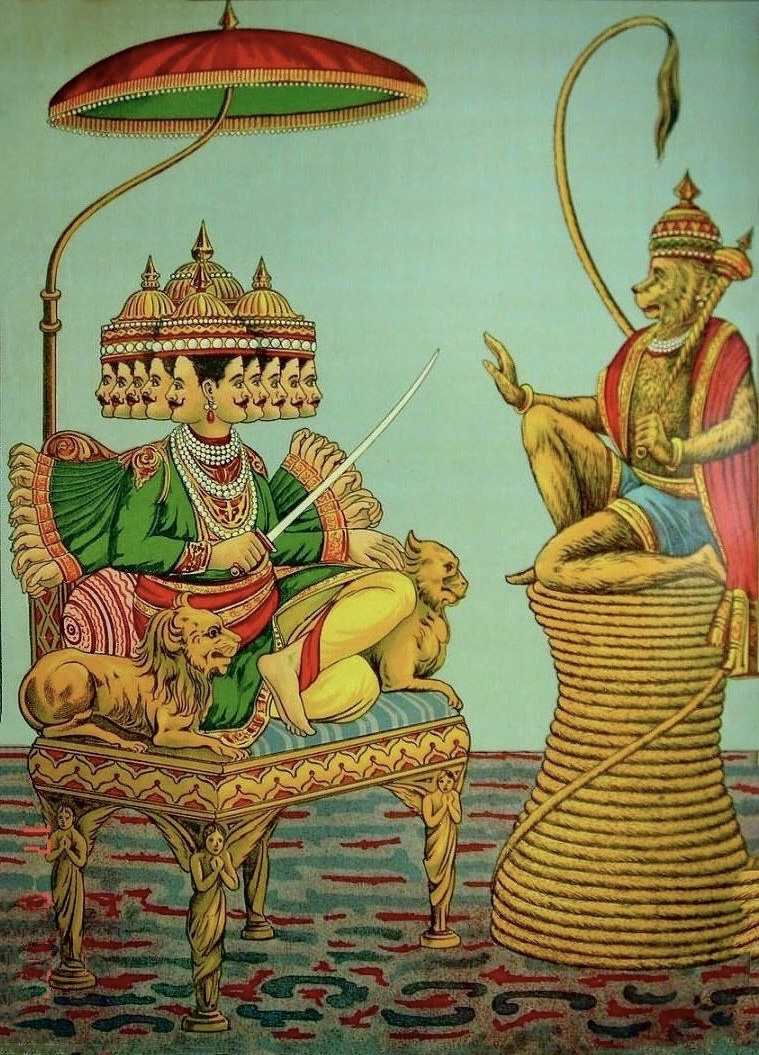
- Angada at Ravana's court
- Affiliation: Vanara, Vaishnavism
- Texts: Ramayana
- Gender: Male
- Region: Kishkindha

Genealogy
- Born: Kishkindha Kingdom
- Parents: Vali (father), Tara (mother)
- Children: Dhruva (son)

Angada (Sanskrit: अङ्गदः, IAST: Aṅgada) is a legendary vanara in Hinduism, who is mentioned in the epic Ramayana. He helps Rama find his wife Sita and fight her abductor, Ravana, in the epic Ramayana. He is the son of Vali and prince of Kishkindha, and is later crowned as the kingdom's monarch.

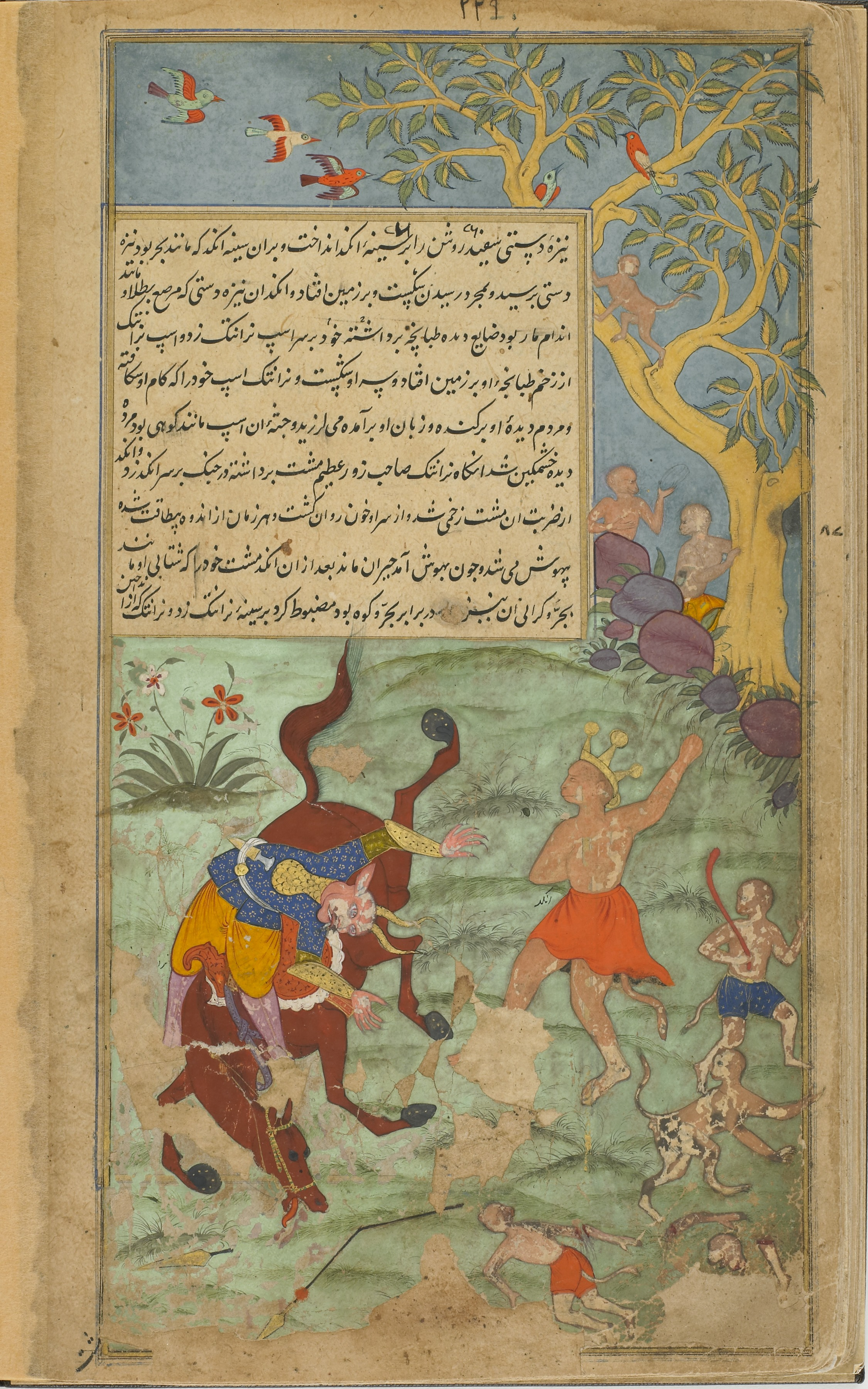
Angada slays Narantaka

== Legend ==
Angada is a son of the powerful vanara king Vali and his wife Tara. He is the nephew of Sugriva. After Rama and Sugriva kill his father, Angada joins Rama's forces to rescue mata Sita from Ravana's captivity.

Angada and Hanuman are instrumental in reconciling Rama and Lakshmana with Sugriva after the king fails to fulfill his promise to help Rama find and rescue Sita. Together, they are able to convince Sugriva to honour his pledge to Rama, instead of spending his time carousing and drinking. Sugriva then calls for vanaras to help find Sita by sending search parties in each cardinal direction and amasses an army that later battles Ravana's forces. Angada leads the southward search party, which consists of Hanuman and Jambavan, which successfully locates Sita in Lanka.

A legend goes by that no one could move Angada's leg. Just before the war, Rama sends Angada to Ravana's court as a peace messenger to give him one last chance to send Sita back to him and stop the war. Angada travels to Ravana's court, and issues him a last warning but Ravana retorts by stating that his father, Vali, is his friend. Angada, however, rejects Ravana's stance, and retorts by saying that there was nothing as divine as serving Rama, and then proceeds to mock Ravana for his foolishness and pride, in front of the entire court. He challenges the present courtiers to move his leg, upon which he promises that he would retreat from the island, forgetting about rescuing Sita. Almost all courtiers take turns to move his leg, but fail to even give it a budge. Even Indrajit, the most powerful son of Ravana, is unable to move the leg. Seeing Indrajit defeated, Ravana rises in fury, and proceeds to accept the challenge, upon which Angada moves his leg out of the way, and Ravana's crown falls off. When the king reaches for his crown, Angada rhetorically wonders why Ravana wishes to touch his leg, and that touching the feet of Rama would be much more fruitful instead. He hurls the crown with such force that it is supposed to have landed at Rama's feet. The prince flies away before Ravana could seize him. Rama is pleased by this act of Angada.

In the Battle of Lanka that ensues, Angada slays many great warriors from Lanka, including Ravana's son Narantaka, and the chief general of Ravana's army, Mahaparshva.

Angada marries the eldest daughter of the vanara Mainda, and has a son, Dhruva.

When his uncle Sugriva decides to retire from the earth and return to his father, Surya, he crowns Angada as the next king of Kishkindha, and of the vanaras.
