= Rumā =

Vanara queen and wife of Vali in epic Ramayana

- Queen of Kishkindha
- Spouse: Sugriva
- House: Kishkindha
- Religion: Hinduism

Rumā (Sanskrit: रुमा) is the queen of Kishkindha mentioned in the epic Ramayana. She is the wife of King Sugrīva, who ruled over the vanara kingdom of Kishkindha.

== Legend ==
Ruma is mentioned in Book IV (Kishkindha Kanda) of the Ramayana. Sugriva fell in love with Ruma, but her father did not approve of their relationship. Hence, Sugriva with the help of Hanuman, abducted Ruma, and they were married. Ruma was taken away from Sugriva by Vāli following the strife of two royal Vānara brothers. Later, the fact of Rumā being withheld by Vāli became the primary justification for Rama's slaying Vāli and helping Sugrīva to become the sovereign of Kishkindha. When accused by Vāli of lowly, treacherous, and unexpected assassination from the shades by Rama's arrow, Rāma says his assassination was a just punishment for the sin Vāli committed when he robbed Sugrīva of Rumā, his wedded spouse, and used her for his pleasure.
