= Kishkindha =

Vanara kingdom in Ramayana

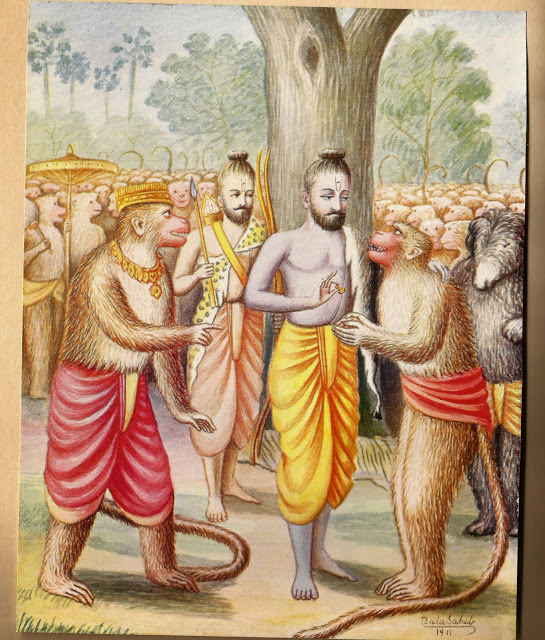
Rama offers his ring to Maruti (Hanuman) to prove that he is Rama's messenger, surrounded by the vanaras of Kishkindha

Kishkindha (Sanskrit: किष्किन्धा, IAST: Kiṣkindhā) is a kingdom of the vanaras in Hinduism. It is ruled by King Sugriva, the younger brother of Vali, in the Sanskrit epic Ramayana. According to the Hindu epic this was the kingdom that Sugriva ruled with the assistance of his counsellor, Hanuman. Kishkindha is identified with the present location of Hampi, the erstwhile royal capital of Vijayanagara Empire.

During the Treta Yuga, the whole region was within the dense Dandaka Forest which was founded by King Danda, son of Ikshvaku, and descendant of Vaivasvata Manu in the Satya Yuga, which extended from the Vindhya range to the South Indian peninsula. Thus, this kingdom was considered that of the vanaras. During the Dvapara Yuga, the Pandava Sahadeva is stated to have visited this kingdom in the epic Mahabharata during his southern military campaign to collect tribute for Yudhishthira's Rajasuya sacrifice.

== Literature ==
=== Ramayana ===
The Ramayana has a book that is based in Kishkindha, known as the Kishkindha Kanda. In this text, a banished Sugriva sends his trusted counsellor, Hanuman, to meet the mysterious Rama and Lakshmana. Satisfied with their noble demeanour, he brings them to Sugriva. The two parties exchange their tales, after which Rama forges an alliance with the former vanara monarch:

I know well that the fruit of friendship is mutual aid, O Great Monkey! I shall slay that Bali, who has carried off your consort! These pointed shafts that you perceivest, these arrows bright as the sun, fly straight to their target. Decorated with heron’s feathers and resembling Indra’s thunderbolt, skilfully wrought, their points sharpened, resembling provoked serpents, they will pierce that perverse wretch with force. To-day you shalt see Bali fall on the earth like a cleft mountain struck by these pointed darts, resembling venomous snakes.

— Valmiki, Ramayana, Kishkindha Kanda, Chapter 5

Sugriva, in turn, shows the cloak and jewels of Sita that had descended from the sky upon his kingdom during her abduction by Ravana. After Sugriva regales the tales of his brother's exploits, he goes to challenge his brother for a duel, having sought Rama's assistance in the fight. When Rama does not loose his arrow, Sugriva flees towards the Rishyamuka hill, where his brother dared not venture. Rama explains that he did not intercede since he could not distinguish between the two, upon which a wreath of flowers was placed around the vanara's neck. The entourage then visit the hermitage of Saptajanas:

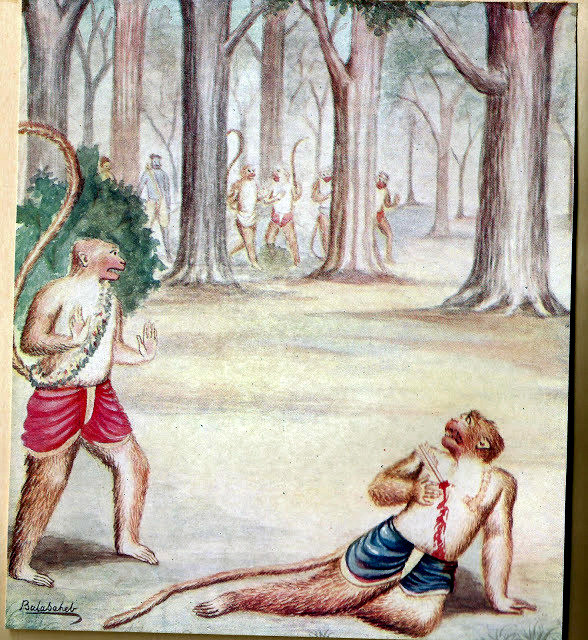
The death of Vali

They observed the trees bowed with the weight of their flowers and the rivers bearing their peaceful waters to the sea. The ravines and cliffs with their chasms, caves, peaks and charming dales, the lakes with their limpid waters of emerald hue, adorned with opening lotus buds, drew their gaze as they passed. Ducks, cranes, swans, woodcock and other waterfowl were heard calling, whilst in the clearings of the woods deer could be seen grazing on the tender grass and young shoots, without fear of the wild beasts that roamed everywhere. Wild and ferocious elephants adorned with ivory tusks, who proved a menace to the lakes by causing the banks to crumble, wandered about here and there and intoxicated with Mada juice, striking their foreheads against the rocks, resembled moving mountains. Monkeys as large as elephants, covered with dust and every species of wild beast and bird were seen by the followers of Sugriva as they passed on their way.

— Valmiki, Ramayana, Kishkindha Kanda, Chapter 13

Ignoring his wife Tara's pleas to make peace with Rama, Vali sets out to duel his brother once more, and is slain by Rama's arrow to his breast. Vali and Rama engage in a conversation about the morality of Rama's actions, to which Rama retorts that the vanara had conducted himself in a heinous manner by forcefully bedding Ruma, Sugriva's wife. Even as Tara laments, Sugriva is installed as king once more. However, four months later, he fails to honour his pledge to support Rama's rescue, lost in his blissful dalliance with Tara. A furious Lakshmana, first mollified by Tara, reproaches Sugriva for his conduct, after which he reconciles with him. Sugriva assembles his vanara forces and commands them to venture into the following regions:

You will first behold the Vindhya ranges, possessing a hundred peaks covered with trees and shrubs of every kind, and the enchanting river, Narmada, frequented by mighty serpents, and the wide and charming stream, Godavari, with its dark reeds, and the captivating Krishnaveni; the regions of Mekhalas and Utkala and the city of Dasharna also; Abravanti and Avanti, Vidarbhas and Nishtikas and the charming Mahishakas. You will see too, the Matsyas, Kalingas and Kaushikas, where you should search for the princess and the Dandaka Forest with its mountains, rivers and caverns and the Godavari, also examine the districts of Andhras, Paundras, the Cholas, Pandyas and Keralas. Then repair to the Ayomukha Mountain, rich in ore, with its marvellous peaks and flowering woodlands; that mountain, possessing lovely forests of sandalwood, should be carefully searched by you.

— Valmiki, Ramayana, Kishkinda Kanda, Chapter 41

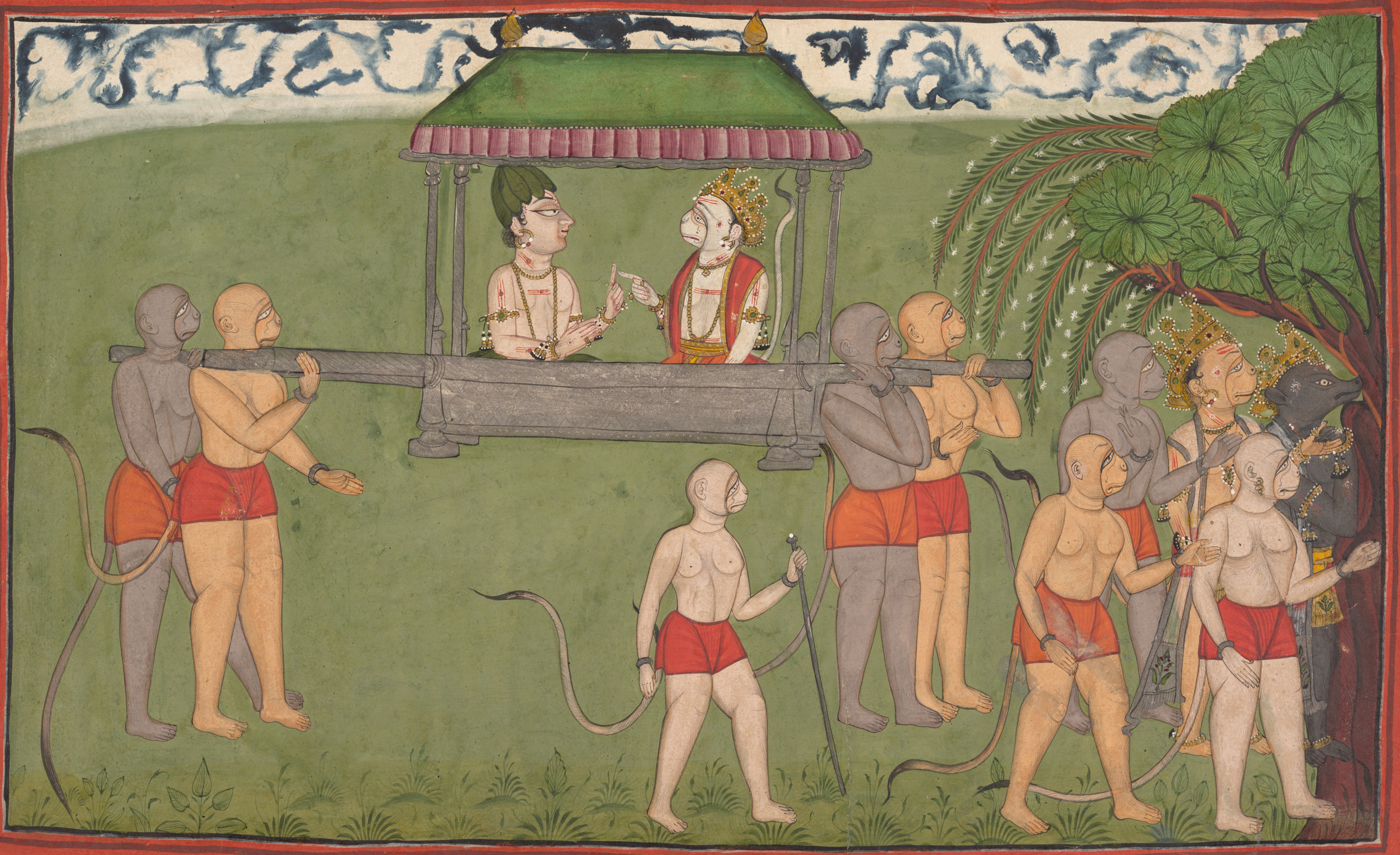
Sugriva and Lakshmana confer with a vanara escort

The vanara army then venture out of Kishkindha to scour these regions for Sita.

=== Mahabharata ===
Sahadeva's conflict with the kings of Kishkindha is mentioned in the Mahabharata:

Sahadeva, on the order of Maharaja Yudhisthira, marched toward the southern countries. He defeated the Surasenas, the Matsyas and brought under his sway Dantavakra, the mighty king of Adhirajas. He conquered the Nishadas and the kings of Avanti, Vinda and Anuvinda. He brought under Maharaja Yudhisthira's rule, King Bhishmaka and the king of the Koshalas. Sahadeva then fought with Mainda and Dvivida, the kings of Kishkinda. Then Sahadeva encountered his toughest challenge at Mahismati; he fought with king Nila, who was aided by Agni, the fire god. The encounter between the two forces was fierce, terrible and bloody, and before long Agni, the fire god, was scorching the front line of chariots, elephants and soldiers in Sahadeva's army. Witnessing the possible extinction of his army, Sahadeva did not know what to do.

— Vyasa, Mahabharata, Chapter 5, Sabha Parva

=== Garuda Purana ===
Brahma mentions Kishkindha while narrating the Ramayanam:

While there, Rama entered into a friendly compact with Sugriva, the brother of the monkey-king Vali, and showed his skill in archery by shooting through the trunks of seven Tala trees. Then he killed Vali and made over the sovereignty of the monkey-land Kishkinda to his brother Sugriva, and quartered himself with his beloved Lakshmana in the outskirts of the Mount Rishyamukha.

— Garuda Purana, Chapter 143

== In popular culture ==
- This kingdom is often identified to be the region around the Tungabhadra river (then known as Pampa Sarovara) near Hampi in present-day Vijayanagara district, Karnataka. The mountain near the river known as Rishimukha, where Sugriva lived with Hanuman during his exile, bears the same name.

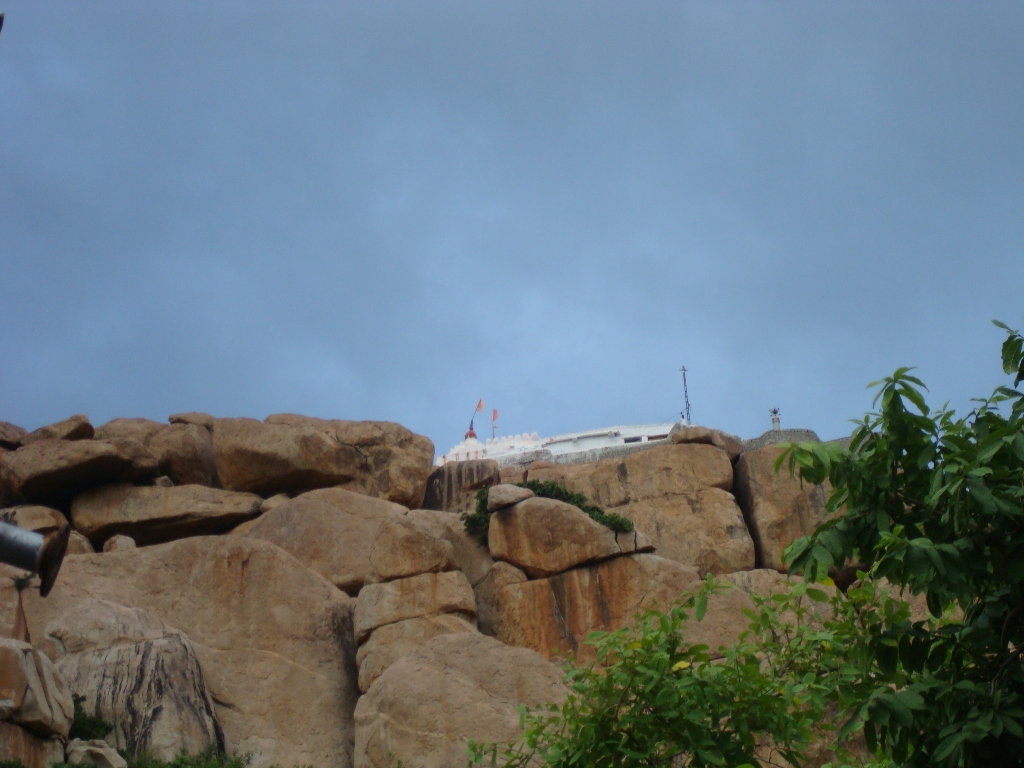
Anjaneya Parvata, said to be the birthplace of Hanuman

- The Anjaneyadri Hill is held by the locals to the birthplace of Hanuman.
- 2024 Malayalam Movie Kishkindha Kaandam have similar reference.

== See also ==
- Sugriva
- Vali
- Hanuman
