= Vali (Ramayana) =

Vanara king in Hindu epic Ramayana

- Ramayana character
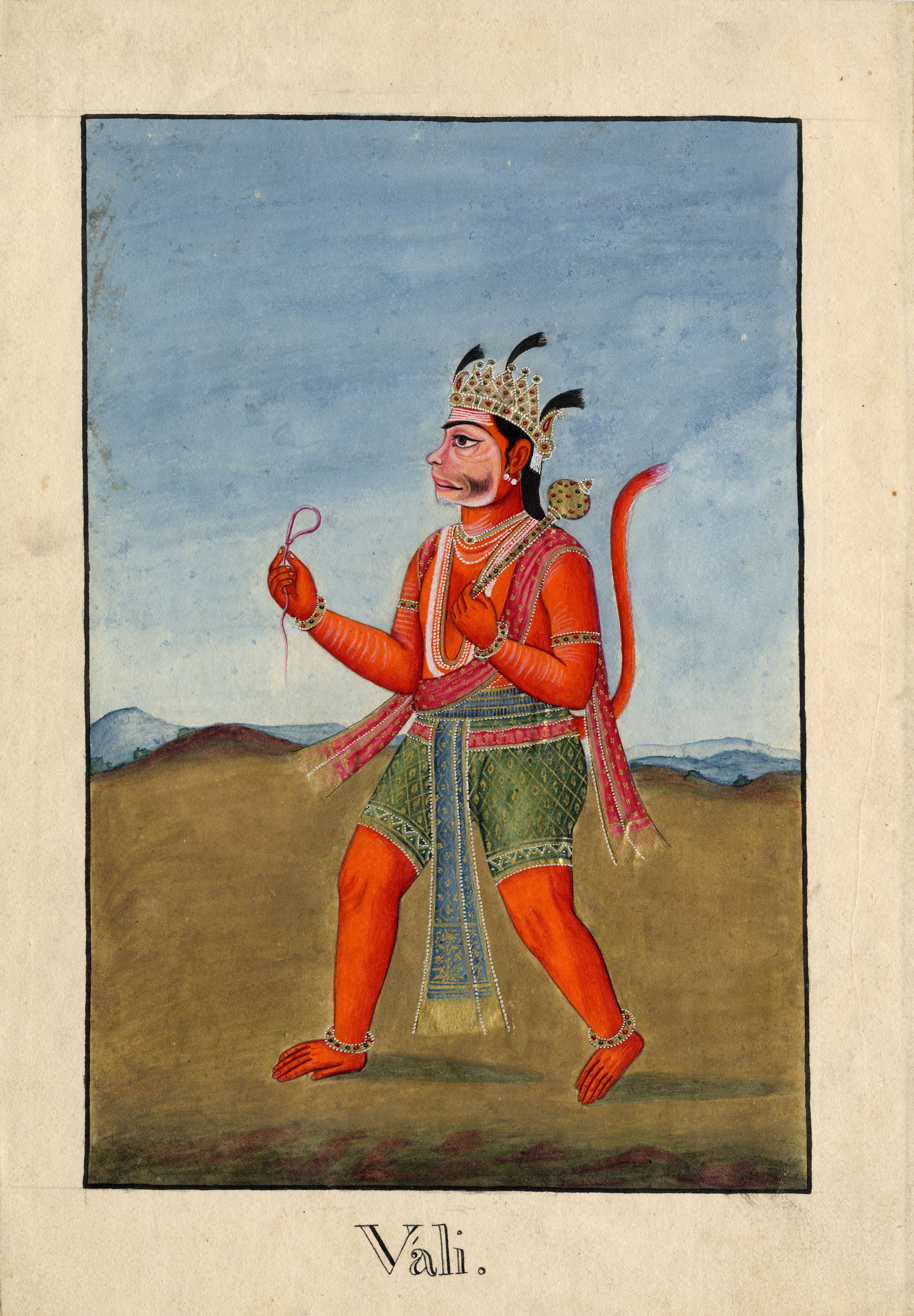
- Painting of Vali

In-universe information
- Family: Indra (father); Aruni (Riksharaja) (mother); Sugriva (younger brother)
- Spouse: Tara
- Children: Angada
- Nationality: Kishkindha

Vali (Sanskrit: वाली) also known as Bali, was a vanara and the king of Kishkindha in the Hindu epic Ramayana. He was the son of Indra, the husband of Tara, the elder brother of Sugriva, and the father of Angada through his wife, Tara.

Vali obtained a pendant from his father, Indra, that which allowed him to restore his energy even when nearing death, making him a formidable fighter. He banished his brother Sugriva, who had assumed his throne, believing him to be dead. Sugriva sought the assistance of Rama, an avatar of Vishnu, to intervene in their conflict. During a duel between the brothers, Rama shot Vali in the chest with an arrow.

== Early life ==
According to the epic, fourteen types of gems or treasures were produced from the churning of the ocean during the time of the Kurma avatar. Among these treasures were various apsaras (divine nymphs), one of whom was Tara. Tara was produced from the churning of the ocean, and Vali, who was assisting his father Indra in the churning, took Tara and married her.

Vali was courageous, as shown when Tara tried to stop him and begged him not to fight Sugriva, warning that Rama was aiding Sugriva. Vali replied to Tara that, even if he were to face a god in battle, he could not ignore a challenge and remain silent. He added that even if the challenger had been his own son, Angada, or Sugriva's wife, Ruma, he would still accept the fight.

== The Quarrel ==
According to the Ramayana, a fierce asura named Mayavi came to the gates of Kishkindha and challenged Vali to a fight. Vali accepted the challenge, but as he approached, the asura grew terrified and fled into a cave. Vali entered the cave, instructing Sugriva to wait outside. When Vali didn’t return, and Sugriva saw blood oozing from the cave, he mistakenly concluded that Vali had been killed. Sugriva then sealed the cave with a large boulder and assumed the kingship of Kishkindha. However, inside the cave, Vali had defeated and killed the demon and soon returned home. Seeing Sugriva acting as king, Vali believed his brother had betrayed him. Though Sugriva tried to explain his actions, Vali refused to listen, forcing Sugriva to flee to Rishyamuka Mountain, the only place Vali couldn’t enter due to a curse from the sage Matanga.

Artistic depiction of Yakshagana. Sugreeva is in fear after seeing a gush of blood and thinks his brother was killed by Mayavi

== Vali's pendant ==
Vali was granted a golden pendant by his father, Indra. According to the Valmiki Ramayana, the pendant significantly increased Vali's energy during combat.

Vali wore the powerful pendant given to him by his father, Indra, during his battle with the demon Dhundubhi and defeated him. The Valmiki Ramayana also describes Vali as having great strength, although it does not mention any duel between Vali and Ravana.

== Rama meets Sugriva ==
While wandering in the Kronch forest with his brother Lakshmana in search of his wife Sita, who had been kidnapped by the rakshasa king Ravana, Rama encounters a gandharva stuck in the body of a distorted demon named Kabandha and kills him, freeing him from a curse. The freed Kabandha then advises Rama to seek Sugriva’s help in finding Sita.

As Rama continues his journey, he meets Hanuman and is impressed by his intelligence and oratory skills, which also boosts his confidence in Sugriva. Sugriva then explain Rama about the conflict between him and his brother Vali. According to Sugriva he and Vali once went to fight demon Mayavi inside of a cave. Vali told Sugriva to wait outside of a cave until he returns and he went in to fight with demons. Sugriva was in constant fear that his brother might have got killed by demons because he was waiting for him for more than a year. He heard the screaming of demons but not his brother, so he started blocking the entrance of a cave with a huge rock and returned back to his city. After his return, the ministers gathered the truth from him believing Vali was dead and force him to accept the throne. However, Vali was not killed later he returned back to the city and found his brother taking his position. Sugriva tries to explain everything to vali, but he was in rage and anger so, he banishes Sugriva from the kingdom and took everything he had. Since then, Sugriva lives in constant fear of being killed by his brother and also claims the innocence and trust of Rama.'

Sugriva is very fearful of Vali and doubts that Rama can defeat him. He tells Rama many remarkable stories of Vali's strength and, as proof, shows him a hole in a sal tree that Vali had made with a single shot. When it is Rama's turn, he pierces seven sal trees in a row with one arrow. After passing through the trees, the arrow even strikes a large rock, splitting it into pieces. Delighted, Sugriva exclaims, "O Rama, you are great!"

Rama asks Sugriva to challenge Vali and lure him outside of Kishkindha. As Rama explains later, he has been unable to enter a city for 14 years. Additionally, Rama does not want to provoke an unnecessary bloodbath with Vali's army, with whom he wishes to maintain friendly relations. Despite this, killing Vali would not be impossible for Rama, as Sugriva and Vali are identical twins. Just a few days earlier, Rama had killed Khara and Dushana along with their army of 14,000 rakshasas.

Sugriva formed an alliance with Rama, who had been traveling across India in search of his kidnapped wife, Sita. In return for Rama's help, Sugriva promised his assistance in defeating Ravana and rescuing Sita. Together, they devised a plan to topple Vali from the throne.

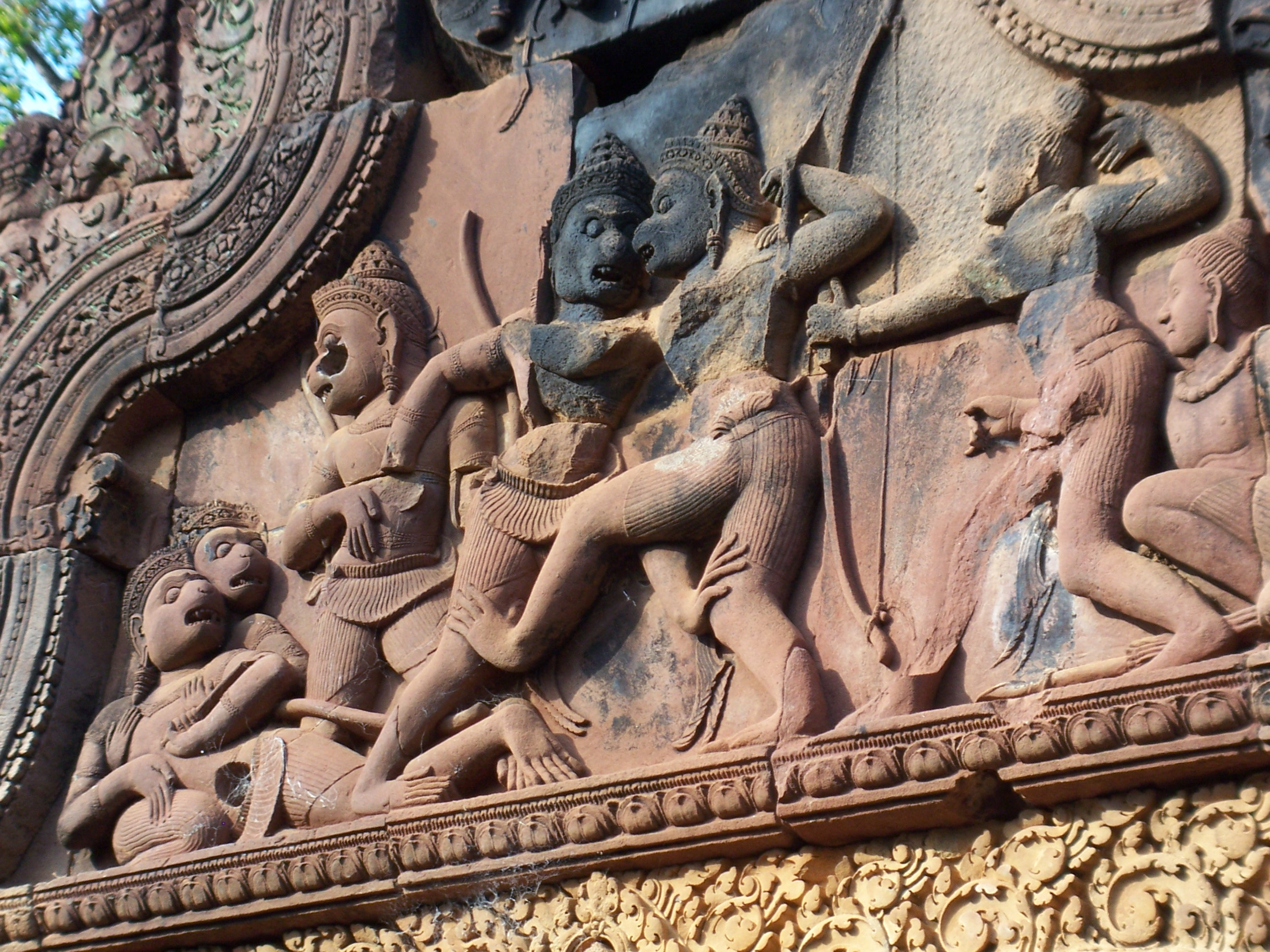
A stone bas relief at Banteay Srei in Cambodia depicts the combat between Vali and Sugriva. In the middle, the two brothers are shown fighting. To the right, Rama fires his bow. To the left, Vali lies dying in the arms of another monkey.

Sugriva challenged Vali to a fight. When Vali emerged to meet the challenge, Rama stepped out from the forest and shot him with an arrow, killing him.

The dying Vali told Rama, "If you are searching for your wife, you should have come to me for help and friendship. Whoever took Sita, I would have brought them to your feet, at your mercy."

Vali asked the following questions:

- He made my wife a widow and stole my kingdom. What was my crime?
- Even if I committed a crime (with my brother), what is your right to kill me? I would have helped you in getting Sita; your father King Dasharatha helped my father King Indra to fight against rakshasas.

Rama makes the following replies to Vali:

- The younger brother should be treated like a son. Even if he made a mistake you should forgive him, especially when he promised to respect you for your whole life.
- About his authority, he said he had permission from King Bharata to spread righteousness and punish evils. You lost your kingdom while fighting with Mayavi and you are no more a king, so how can I ask you for your help?

Rama also suggest Vali to be grateful for being killed.

In a painful moment, Vali accepts Rama's explanation and even begs for forgiveness for questioning rama's action to punish him.

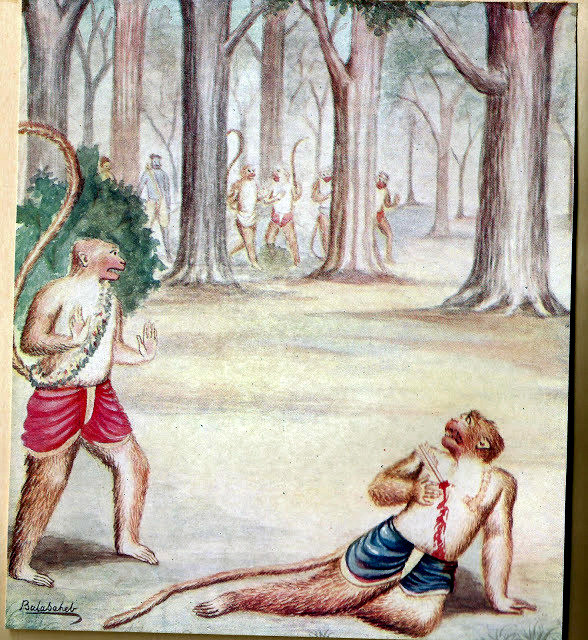
Killing of Vali

== After Vali's Death ==
After the death of Vali, Sugriva recaptures his kingdom and regains his wife, Ruma. Angada, the son of Vali and Tara, is appointed Yuvaraja, or crown prince.

Rama's slaying of Vali held special significance. Initially, Vali argued with Rama about his killing, but Rama explained the various purusharthas and how everything was preordained according to the kalachakra, ultimately granting him moksha. Vali was then convinced and asked his son Angada to stand by his uncle Sugriva and assist in the divine work of Rama.

Vali's son, Angada, joined Rama's army and was given important responsibilities in the war against Ravana.

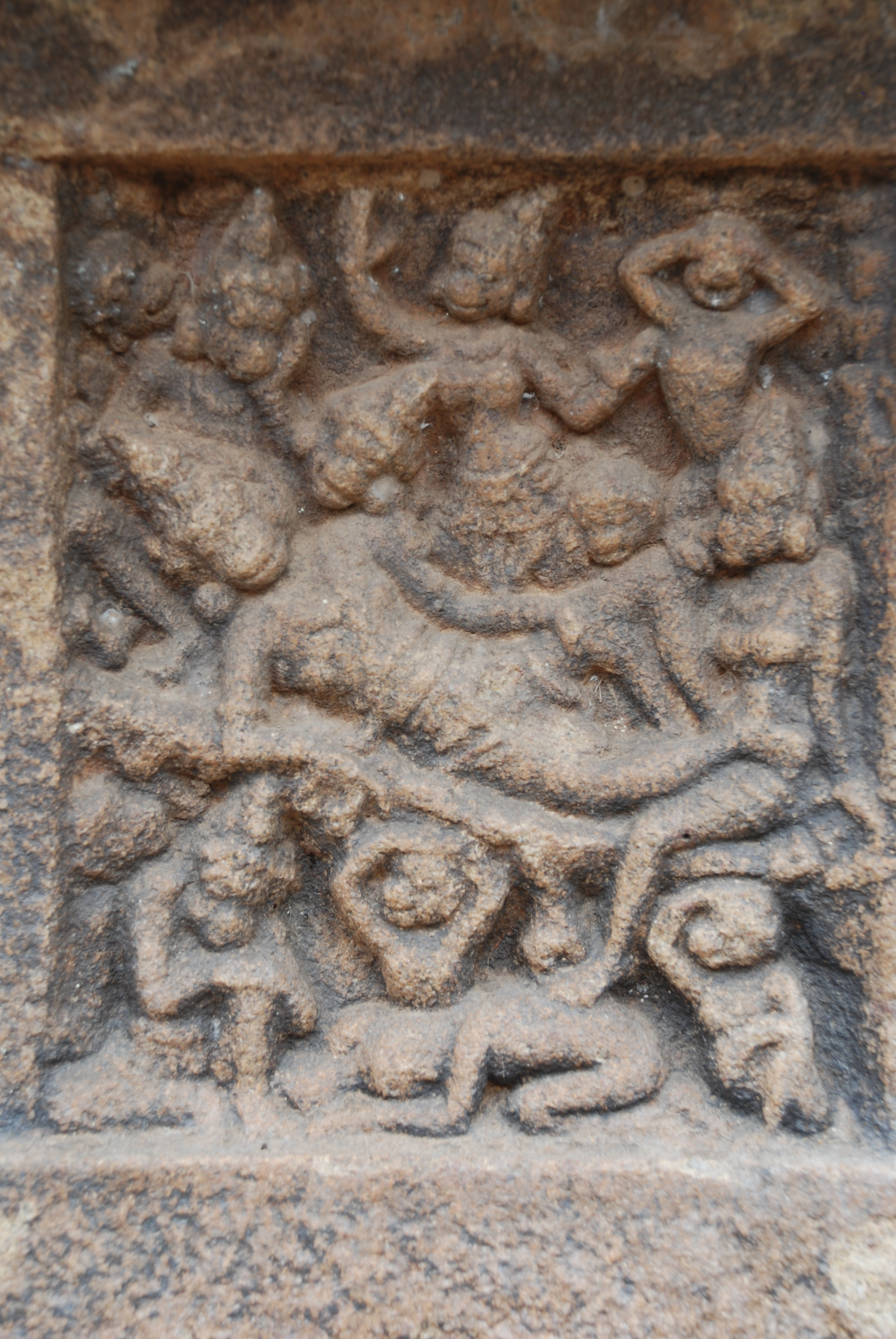
The miniature panel in Pullamangai, Pasupathi Koil, Thanjavur captures the scene of Vali's death. Tara his wife, Angada his son, his brother Sugreeva and other Vanaras are lamenting his death.
