= Hindu mythological wars =

Conflicts of the Hindu Mythos

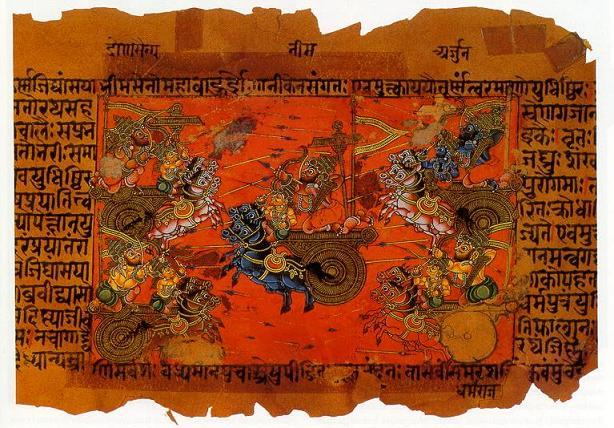
The Battle of Kurukshetra, fought between the Kauravas and the Pandavas, recorded in the Mahabharata.

Hindu mythological wars are the wars described in the Hindu texts of ancient India. These wars depicted both mortals of great prowess as well as deities and supernatural beings, often wielding supernatural weapons of great power. Hindu teachings prescribe war as the final option, to be employed only after all peaceful methods are exhausted. Participation in righteous war, or dharmayuddha, was said to be honourable and was a principal duty of the Kshatriya or the warrior varna, and victory in such wars was regarded as a matter of honour.

== In Vedic literature ==
=== Indra and Vritra ===
The central battle in the Vedas is between Indra and Vritra, and the defeat of the demon Vritra leads to the liberation of rivers, cattle and Ushas (dawn/light).

=== The Kshatriya class ===
==== War sacrifices ====
- Ashvamedha: The famous horse-sacrifice was conducted by allowing a horse to roam freely for a slated period of time, with the king performing the sacrifice laying claim to all the lands it touched. The king whose authority is contested must prove himself in battle or accept the imperial supremacy of the challenging king. When the horse returns safely after the period of time, the main sacrifice is performed, and the king, if successful in obtaining dominance over other kings, is crowned Emperor of the World. The Ashwamedha allows the opportunity to maintain peace if the kings do not choose to contest the sacrificial horse.
- Rajasuya: Considered the ultimate sacrifice, the king performing the sacrifice must openly challenge every king in the world to accept his supremacy or defeat him in battle. If and when the king returns successfully, having beaten all other known rulers, the performance of the sacrifice will send him to the abode of Indra after death.
- Vishvajit Yagna: a sacrifice performed by Brahmins after a king had won a war.

== In Puranic literature ==
=== The Devasura War ===
The perennial battle between the devas and asuras is undertaken over the dominion of the three worlds: Svarga, Bhumi, and Patala, (Heaven, Earth, and the underworld). Both races are technically equal, possessors of great religious and martial powers, but the devas are committed to the worship of the Supreme Being and the practice of virtue. The asuras have atheistic and devious tendencies that grow over time. The divide is the greatest in the Kali Yuga, the final age.

=== Twelve Battles ===
In the Varaha kalpa, twelve battles between the devas and the asuras are described in the Brahmanda Purana:

1. Narasimha and Hiranyakashipu
2. Vamana and Mahabali
3. Varaha and Hiranyaksha
4. Samudra Manthana: The churning of the ocean
5. Tarakamaya War: Soma and Brihaspati
6. Adibaka: According to the Devi Bhagavata Purana, the king Harishchandra promised to Varuna that he would celebrate for his propitiation the great Naramedha sacrifice, when he would offer his own son as a victim to be immolated to cure himself of his disease. When he had second thoughts, the guru Vashishta suggested that he sacrifice a Brahmin boy instead, and the king acquired a boy called Sunasepha for the deed. Vishvamitra urged him to release the innocent child, and when the king refused, taught him a mantram of Varuna, which often invoked, freed him. Vashishta cursed Vishvamitra to be born in his next birth as a baka (crane), and the latter cursed the former to take birth as an adi (myna). The crane Visvamitra built its nest on the top of a tree on the Manasarovara lake and began to live there. Vashistha, too, assumed the form of an adi bird, and built his nest on the top of another tree and lived there. Thus the two rishis spent their days in full enmity towards each other. These two birds used to shriek so terribly loud that they became a nuisance to all, and they fought daily with each other. Brahma then freed them from these curses, and the gurus returned to their ashrams.
7. Traipura: Tripurasura and Shiva
8. Andhakara: Andhaka and Shiva
9. Dhvaja: In the battle called Dhvaja, the danava Vipracitti, described as the "terror of the celestials", adept in the art of maya and a being who threatened the three worlds, was killed by Indra after penetrating a hundred thousand dhvajas (banners).
10. Varta: The asura Vritra and Indra
11. Halahala: According to the Devi Bhagavata Purana, the Halahalas were a sect of asuras who were the first creation of the Trimurtis, when they also possessed the power of creation. The Halahalas, who became very powerful within a short period of time, earned from Brahma all the boons they wanted, and they then conquered the three worlds. At last, they barricaded Kailasa and Vaikuntha as well, so Vishnu and Shiva defeated them after a fierce fight lasting for a thousand years. The deities returned to their abodes and spoke about their achievements. Their wives laughed at the bravado of their husbands. At this Vishnu got angry with Lakshmi and Shiva with Parvati, and in protest the Devis left their husbands. From that day onwards, Vishnu and Shiva began losing their power. Brahma, who divined the reason for the growing weakness of Vishnu and Shiva persuaded Lakshmi and Parvati to return to their rightful places and support their husbands. Yet, Brahma told them that in future he alone would handle the work of creation. Thus were Vishnu and Shiva divested of their right to creation.
12. Kolahala: According to the Padma Purana, Kolahala was a famous asura. In the battle between the devas and the asuras carried on by Subrahmanya, this asura confronted Malyavan and was killed.

=== War sacrifices conducted ===
- Ashvamedha: King Sagara successfully performed it 99 times. If a King performs it 100 times, he becomes eligible to obtain throne of King of Heaven. Sagara also performed for a 100th time but failed because of Indra's evil plot.

== Vyuha: Cohorts of battle ==
- Chakra Vyuha or the "Wheel Formation": A winding, ever-rotating circular formation; considered impenetrable in the Mahabharata by all warriors except for Krishna, Arjuna, Drona, Parashurama, Pradyumna, and Abhimanyu. Abhimanyu had learnt how to break into the formation (in the womb of Subhadra) but not how to break out of it and is trapped inside during the Mahabharata war.
- Padma Vyuha or the "lotus formation" : A tricky formation in which the army is arranged in the form of lotus petals. Once a warrior enters it, it is very difficult to escape.
- Krauncha Vyuha: The crane-shaped formation of an army; forces are distributed to form spanning wing-sides, with a formidable penetrating centre, depicting the crane's head and beak.
- Sarpa Vyuha: Winding Snake Formation
- Makara Vyuha: Crocodile Formation
- Sakata Vyuha: Cart Formation
- Shukar Vyuha: Pig Formation
- Vajra Vyuha: Diamond formation, the toughest and most difficult after Chakravyuha.
- Kurma Vyuha: Turtle formation
- Garuda Vyuha: Eagle formation
- Suchi Vyuha: Needle formation
- Simha Vyuha: Lion formation

== Pralaya: The end of the world ==
- The end of the world is prophesied to happen at the end of the Kali Yuga - the final stage of the world, and the last of the four stages. Kalki, the final Avatar of Vishnu is also prophesied to appear the end of the Kali Yuga, to wage the final battle between good and evil bringing end of the world and start of new world.
- Shiva Nataraja, the Destroyer, kills the paramount demon of Ego and performs the Tandava Nritya (The Dance of Tandava) on his back, ending with the destruction of the universe performing Rudra Tandava.
- In Shaktism, the mystical dance by Goddess Kali (the terrifying form of Parvati, Shiva's consort), that is, dark energy for destroying all forms of matter, materials, beings, and illusions, which are absorbed within herself i.e. the Supreme Brahman.

== The Ramayana ==
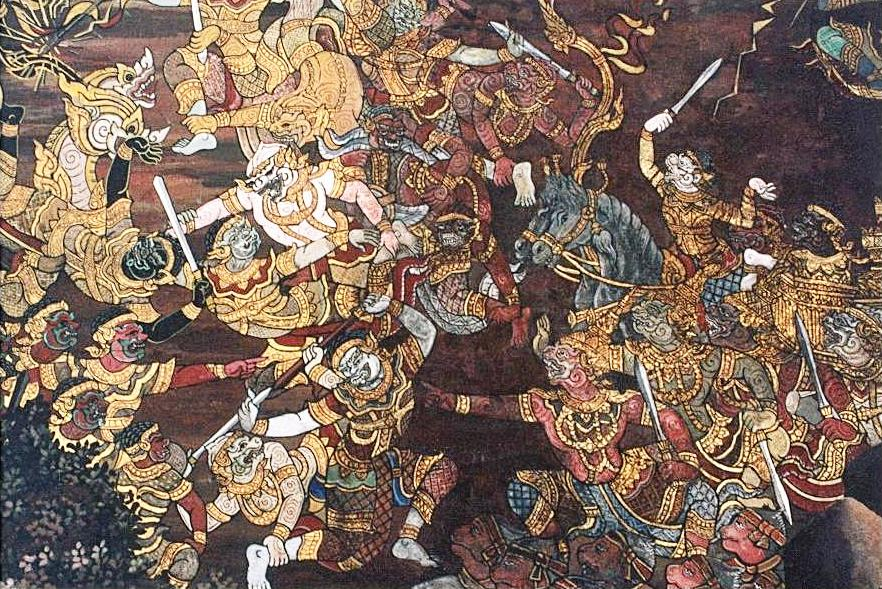
The epic story of Ramayana was adopted by several cultures across Asia. Shown here is a Thai historic artwork depicting the battle which took place between Rama and Ravana.

- Vishvamitra: He was the preceptor of Rama and Lakshmana, a powerful tapasvi and Brahmarishi. He bestows the knowledge of all divine weaponry to Rama and Lakshmana, leads them to kill powerful demons, and instructs them in religion and military arts.
- Rama: He was 7th Avatar of Lord Vishnu. Rama was an extremely powerful warrior and had knowledge of usage of many celestial astras. Rama single-handedly slayed the 14,000 demon hordes of Khara (in one hour, in the Ramayana), the demons Maricha and Subahu, Ravana's chief commander Prahasta and is responsible for the ultimate killing of Ravana himself.
- Lakshmana: He was also very powerful like his brother. He was incarnation of Anantha-Seshanag. He slayed extremely powerful demons including Atikaya and Indrajit.
- Hanuman: He was son of Kesari and Anjana. He was one of the Rudras of Shiva. He was first trained by Sun god Surya and later Shiva himself mentored him. Later he became Vanara minister of Sugriva. He is the greatest devotee of Rama, famous for his unerring service, absolute loyalty and great feats of courage. Hanuman is responsible for killing many demons, as well as burning the city of Lanka. His strength is given by his father Vayu, and by virtue of the boons bestowed on him by various Gods, no astra and weapon could harm him. He can transform into any size and shape as he desired. He was also well expert in using celestial astras. He also possessed Mohini astra, Rudra astra etc.
- Ravana: blessed by his fearsome 10,000 year tapasya to be the most powerful being on earth, invulnerable to every God, demon and living being, save man. Although an expert on the Vedas, a great king, and a great devotee of Shiva, he is the emperor of evil due to his patronage of demons, murder of kings and humiliation of the Gods headed by Indra.
- Indrajita: He was the first-born son of mighty Ravana. Originally his name was Meghanada. He was master of illusion war techniques. He became the possessor of several supreme celestial weapons. He defeated Indra and arrested him. Then Brahma appeared and asked him to free Indra. Meghanada did as Brahma directed and was then granted boon : he would never be killed in any battle, until his Yagna (fire-worship) of his native goddess Nikumbala was disturbed and destroyed. On the completion of the Yagna, a supreme celestial chariot would appear, boarding which, Indrajit would become unkilled in any battle. But Brahma also cautioned him that whosoever would destroy this yagna, would also kill him. He was killed by Lakshmana.
- Kumbhakarna: the gigantic brother of Ravana was a fearsome demon who sleeps for six months at a stretch, rising for only one day and then returning to his slumber. Kumbhakarna could slay hundreds of warriors by the sweep of his hand or step of his foot. He was killed by Rama in the war.
- Prahasta: the chief commander of Lanka's army who was killed on the 1st day of the war of Rama and Ravana.
- Atikaya: the second son of Ravana, who had an indestructible armor given to him by Brahma that can only be pierce by the Brahmastra. Both Atikaya and his cousin Trishira were the reincarnations of Madhu and Kaitabha, who were defeated by Mahavishnu.
- Akshayakumara: the youngest son of Ravana who died, fighting Hanuman in Ashok Vatika.
- Shatrughna: Youngest son of King Dasharatha, youngest brother of Rama. He killed Lavana, son of Madhu and Kumbhini (a sister of Ravana) and became the King of Mathura.
- Bharata: Younger brother of Rama, elder to Lakshmana and Shatrugna. He along with his maternal uncle Yudhajit, conquered Gandhara and created his kingdom of Takshasila and Pushkalavati by defeating Gandharvas and inhabiting that kingdom.
- Vali: Son of Vanara king Vriksharaja, spiritual son of King of Gods- Indra. Vali was invincible in Treta Yuga. Vali defeated some of the greatest warriors like Ravana. Vali was blessed with the ability to obtain half the strength of his opponent before which he already had strength of 70,000 elephants. Hence, Rama killed Vali by hiding behind the trees.

Atirathis:

- Akampana
- Kampana
- Devantaka
- Narantaka
- Akshayakumara
- Ahiravana
- Kumbha
- Nikumbha
- All younger sons of Ravana

Maharathis:

- Lakshmana
- Ravana
- Kumbhakarna
- Atikaya
- Jambavan
- Sugriva
- Angada
- Bharata
- Shatrughna
- Vali (Ramayana)

Atimaharathis:

- Rama
- Indrajita
- Hanuman

=== War sacrifices conducted ===
- Ashvamedha: Rama performed the Ashvamedha successfully.

== The Mahabharata ==
- Kuru Army: 11 Akshauhinis is formed by the kingdom of Hastinapura in alliance with races like the Samshaptakas, Trigartas, the Narayana army, the Sindhu army and Madra.
  - Commanders in Chief: Bhishma, Drona, Karna, Ashwathama, Shalya, Shakuni, Duryodhana, Bhagadatta, Kripa, Srutayudha and Kritavarma
  - Rathis: Duryodhana (8 Rathi), Somadatta, Sudakshina, Shakuni, Jayadratha, Dussasana, Vikarna, 97 Kauravas, Duryodhana's son Lakshmana and Dussasana's son Durjaya were Rathi warriors.
  - Atirathis: Kritavarma, Kripacharya, Shalya, Bhurisravas, Brihadbala, Susharma.
  - Maharathis: Bhishma, Drona, Ashwathama, Bhagadatta, Karna
- Pandava Army: is a coalition of 7 Akshauhinis, primarily the Panchala and Matsya forces, the Rakshasa forces of Bhima's son, and Vrishni-Yadava heroes.
  - Commander in Chief: Dhristadyumna
  - Rathis: Uttamaujas, Shikhandi, Yuyutsu, Uttar and Draupadeyas
  - Atirathis: Yudhishthira, Nakula, Sahadeva, Kuntibhoja, Ghatotkacha,
  - Maharathis: Arjuna, Satyaki, Bhima, Drupada, Abhimanyu, Dhristadyumna
- Abhimanyu: Abhimanyu is a warrior from the Mahabharata who is known for entering the Chakravyuha on the 14th day of battle but was killed because he didn’t know how to come out of the Chakravyuha.
- Ashwatthama: the son of Drona, one of the seven Chiranjeevis . He is a great warrior. Ashwathama and Kripa are considered to be the lone survivors still living who actually fought in the Kurukshetra war. Ashwathama was born with a gem in his forehead which gives him power over all living beings lower than humans. This gem is supposed to protect him from attacks by ghosts, demons, poisonous insects, snakes, animals etc.
- Arjuna: He was the son of Indra and Kunti He performed incredible feats like defeating Gods in Khandavaprastha, defeating and capturing Gandharva King Chitrasena after killing 1 million Gandharvas and also killing asuras including Nivatakavachas, etc.
- Bhima: The 2nd most physically strong character in the Mahabharata after Hanuman. Bhima had phenomenal personal strength, he is also known for killing many powerful kings and demons like Jarasandha, Kirmira, Bakasura, Hidimba, Jatasura, Kichaka, and wrestler Jimut, he was an unsurpassed master of the mace weapon and a consummate wrestler. He slayed all the one hundred Kuru brothers including the chief antagonist of the epic, Duryodhana.
- Duryodhana: He was a skilled warrior with mace in the Mahabharata war. The only men who could beat him in a mace fight was Bhima, and Balarama, the elder brother of Krishna.
- Dussasana: Younger brother of Duryodhana who assaulted Draupadi in the Game of Dice. He was known to be an aggressive warrior but was brutally slain by Bhima on 16th day of Kurukshetra war.
- Bhishma: the most consummate warrior trained by Parashurama, Bhishma was indestructible by any warrior (except Arjuna and Lord Krishna) when he lifts his weapons. Having countered all the kings of the earth, he is the Commander in Chief of the Kuru Army.
- Drona: the guru of the Kauravas and Pandavas, Drona is a great master of Vedic military arts and almost every celestial weapon. He is invulnerable to any attack (except to Arjuna, Karna, Bhisma, Krishna and Balarama) till he holds a weapon of any sort. He also has great religious knowledge and wisdom. He becomes the second Kuru commander.
- Karna: the son of Surya and first born of Kunti who shunned him due to her being the mother of the Pandavas. Karna was the disciple of Lord Parashurama and he learnt the knowledge of Brahmastra from him.
- Nakula: the fourth brother of the Pandavas. It is said that he was the most handsome man in the world. He was an expert in the art of sword warfare. He was also greatly associated with horses. During the Kurukshetra war, he was the one who killed most of the offspring of all the Kauravas.
- Sahadeva: the fifth brother of the Pandavas. He was an expert in the art of axe warfare. He was also greatly associated with sheep, insects. During the Kurukshetra war, he killed Shakuni.

=== Levels of warrior excellence according to Bhishma in the Mahabharata ===
Before war, Bhishma mistreated Karna by calling him Artha-rathi because he despised Karna's antagonistic nature towards the Pandavas.

==== Atimaharathis in the enitre Mahabharata ====
According to Bhishma, there are only two atimaharathis in the entire Mahabharata:

- Parashurama
- Krishna

Both of whom are avatars of Lord Vishnu.

=== Deities mentioned ===
- Shukra: the Preceptor of the Asuras, their high priest and guru, worshiper of the Supreme Lord, but remains supportive of the Asuras.
- Vritra: the Asura son of Savitr deva. Deva Savitr who performs a sacrifice to obtain a son who is capable to be ruler of the three worlds.

=== War sacrifices conducted ===
- Ashvamedha: In the Mahabharata, Yudhishthir performed this yagna and all 4 pandhava completed.
- Rajasuya: It was performed by king Duryodhana in the Mahabharata epic. 5 Pandavas had conquered whole world for the sake of Yudhisthira. It was also performed by King Yudhishthira and the four pandavas and defeated all the kings except bhagdatta, guhyakas, and north harivarsha.
- Vaishnava Yagna: Only Karna performed this Yagya after lord Rama. Karna conquered the entire world on a single chariot, he annexed all the kingdoms, sub-kingdoms and all major portions of Indian subcontinent. Thus he performed Vaishnava Yagya at Hastinapur under Vyasa and other Brahmins blessings.

== Major deities ==
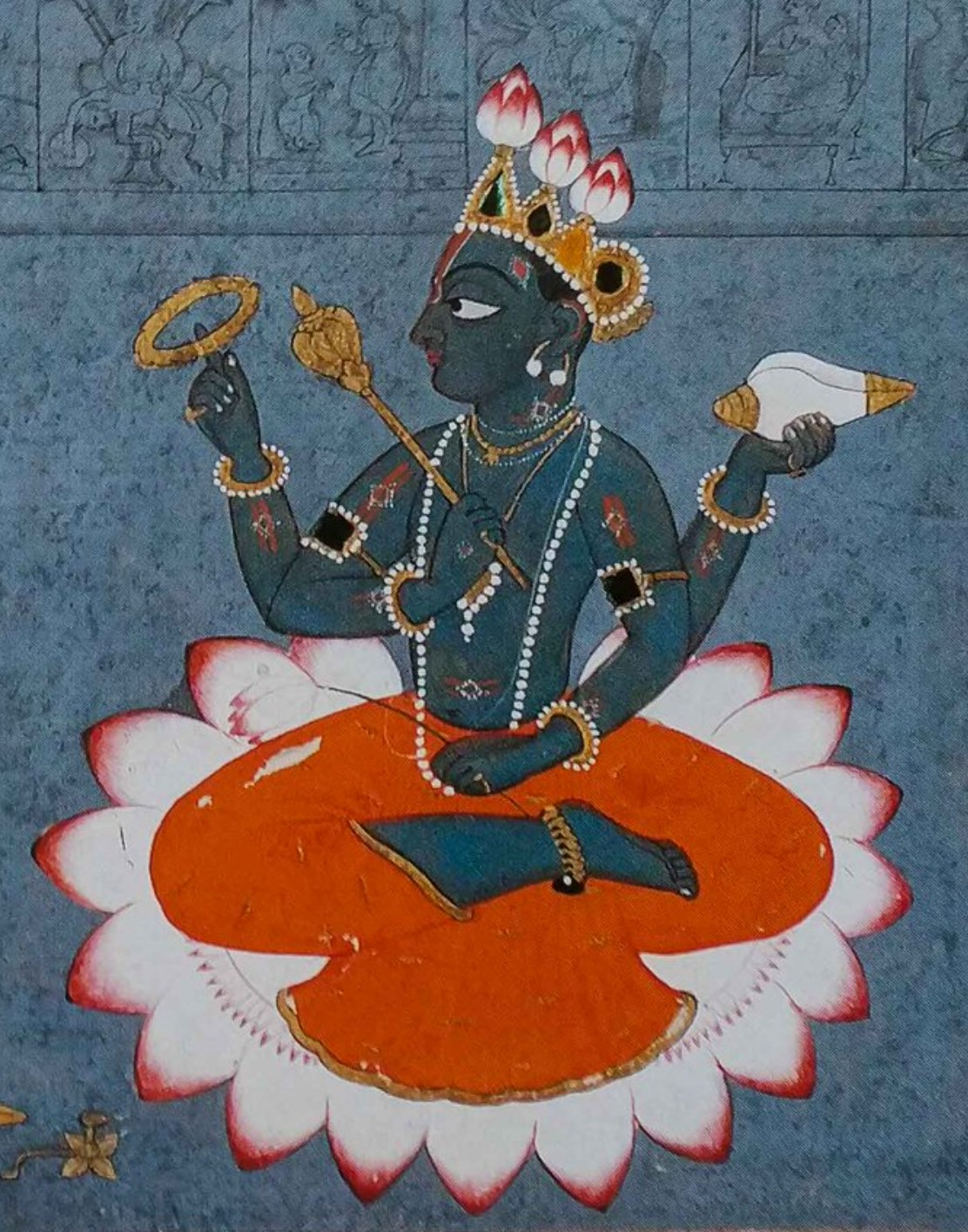
A painting of Vishnu

=== Vishnu ===
Vishnu, the preserver deity, is considered to be the Ultimate Reality in the Vaishnavism tradition of Hinduism. He is the spouse of Lakshmi, the goddess of prosperity. In the Puranas, he periodically takes birth as an avatar upon the earth. Vishnu has 10 avatars: Matsya, Kurma, Varaha, Narasimha, Vamana, Parashurama, Rama, Balarama or Buddha, Krishna, and Kalki. Vishnu is also said to have total of 36 forms other than these ten incarnations, including Mohini, Nara-Narayana, Arjuna, Dattatreya, Dhanvantari, Hayagriva, and several others. In battle, the avatars of Vishnu are aided by a variety of astra, or celestial weapons. The mantra employed to invoke him is Om Namo Narayanaya. His two most popular human avatars, Rama and Krishna, possess many celestial weapons. Krishna also employed a few of these weapons in the Mahabharata. These include:

- Kaumodaki: The divine mace; Krishna slays the demon Dantavakra with it.
- Kodanda: Also called Sharanga, it is a celestial bow wielded by Parashurama, Rama, and Krishna.
- Nandaka: The sword of Vishnu that is also wielded by his avatar of Krishna.
- Narayanastra: Narayanastra is one of the most powerful astras in the universe. The personal missile weapon of Vishnu in his Narayana form, this astra lets loose a powerful tirade of millions of deadly missiles simultaneously. The intensity of the shower increases with resistance. The only solution is enacting submission before the missile; only then will it cease. The Narayanastra was first used by Rama in the Ramayana. Then, thousands of years later, this astra was again used by Ashwatthama in the Kurukshetra War against the Pandava army. Apart from Rama, only Ashwatthama possessed this weapon.
- Parashu: The axe of Parashurama, the sixth avatar of Vishnu. This axe was presented to him by Shiva.
- Sharkha: The bow of Krishna, 8th avatar of Vishnu.
- Sudarshana Chakra: The divine, spinning disc with sharp outer spears, one of the four attributes of Vishnu. The Sudarshana Chakra flies at the command of Krishna, spinning away to tear off the heads of his opponents, or to perform any function desired by Vishnu. It is most famously used by Krishna in the Mahabharata.
- Vaishnavastra: Vaishnavastra is one of the most powerful astras along with the Narayanastra. The personal missile weapon of Krishna, once fired it cannot be thwarted, save by the will of Vishnu himself.

=== Shiva ===
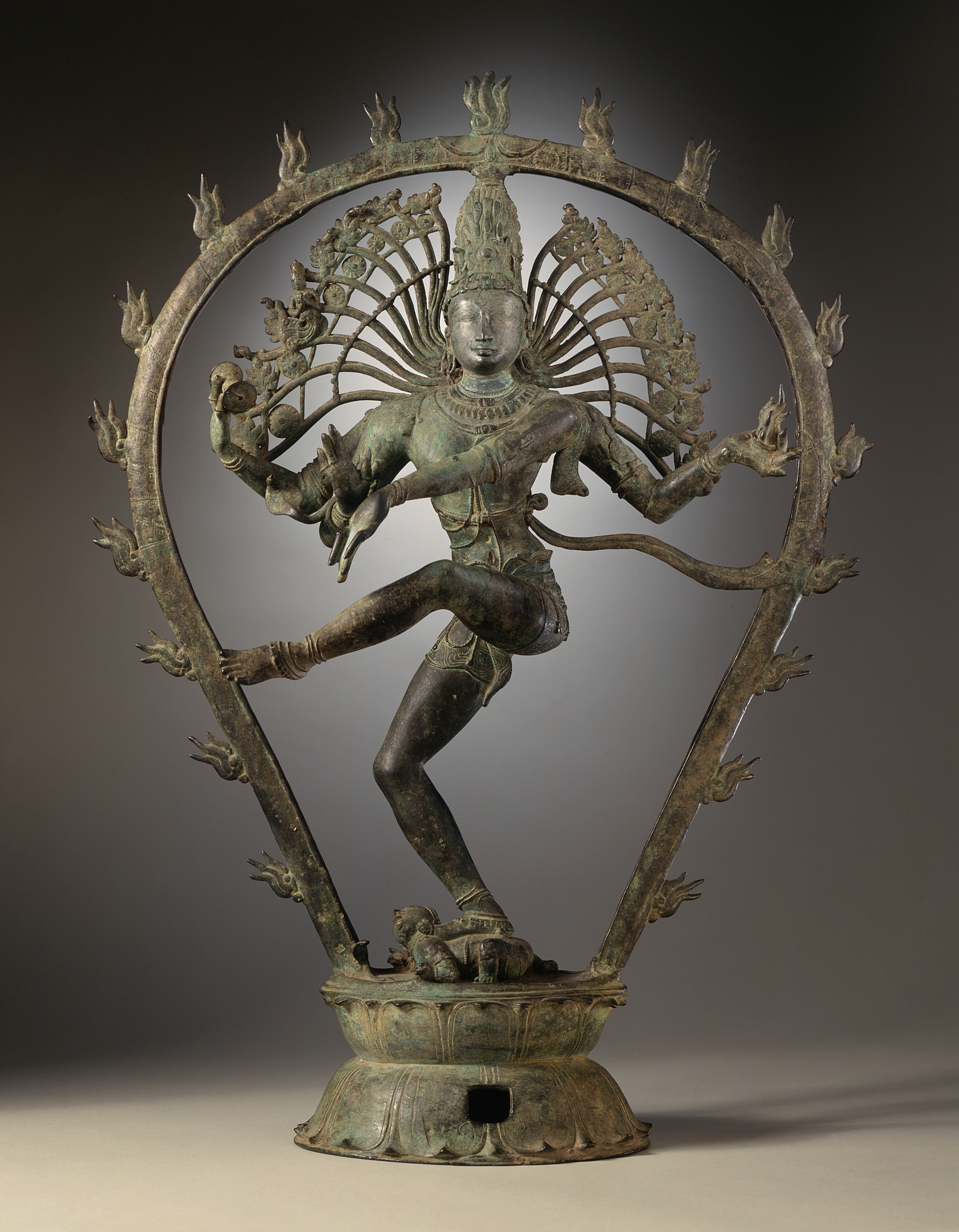
11th-century statue of Shiva as Nataraja, the lord of the dance

Shiva, the destroyer deity, is the Ultimate Reality in Shaiva tradition. He is the spouse of Parvati, the goddess of power. He is represented by his forms, Mahakala and Bhairava. Shiva is often pictured holding the damaruka, an hourglass-shaped drum, along with his trishula, a trident-staff. The mantra to invoke him is Om Namah Shivaya. Shiva is also considered as the Mahadeva, the great god. He is often worshipped in his phallic representation, the lingam.

Assigned with the task of destroying all of the universe at the end of time, Shiva is one of the most fearsome warriors as well as the revered yogis in Hindu tradition. Tandava is the dance of this destroyer deity, which he performs over the body of a demon. Shiva employs his power to kill the Asura Tripura, destroying the flying three cities of Tripura. In battle, Shiva and his amshas (spirits) deploy formidable weapons controlled by him. Some of these are:

- Arrow of Shiva: It can destroy creation. Returns to the quiver after being used.
- Chandrahas: Sword of Ravana granted by Shiva as a boon.
- Ekasha Gada: The mace of Shiva. A blow from the weapon is the equivalent of being hit by a million elephants.
- Girish: A special sword of Shiva with unique characteristics.
- Jayantha Vel: A spear which contains the power of the third eye of Shiva.
- Khaṭvāṅga: In Hinduism, the god Shiva - Rudra carried the khatvāṅga as a staff weapon and are thus referred to as khatvāṅgīs.
- Maheshwara Chakra: The chakra of Shiva.
- Parashu: The axe of Shiva given to Parashurama (the sixth avatar of Vishnu).
- Pashupatastra: An irresistible and the most destructive personal weapon of Shiva, discharged by the mind, the eyes, words, or a bow. This is the most devastating weapon in the universe. Sage-King Vishwamitra, and Arjuna are only other persons who possessed this weapon.
- Pinaka: The celestial bow of Shiva.(Shiva's bow): A bow given by Shiva to Janaka and was broken by Rama during Sita's swayamvara
- Vijaya Dhanush:Vijaya (bow): A bow given by Shiva to Parasurama to kill Kshatriyas
- Shiva Kaakam: An unconquerable weapon of Shiva.
- Shiva Parham: A long noose (of Shiva) from which even the gods can't escape from.
- Shiva Vajra: A vajra that is as powerful as Indra's Vajra.
- Teen Baan: Shiva gave Barbarika three infallible arrows (Teen Baan). A single arrow was enough to destroy all opponents in any war, and it would then return to Barbarika's quiver.
- Trishula (Trident): The trident of Shiva.

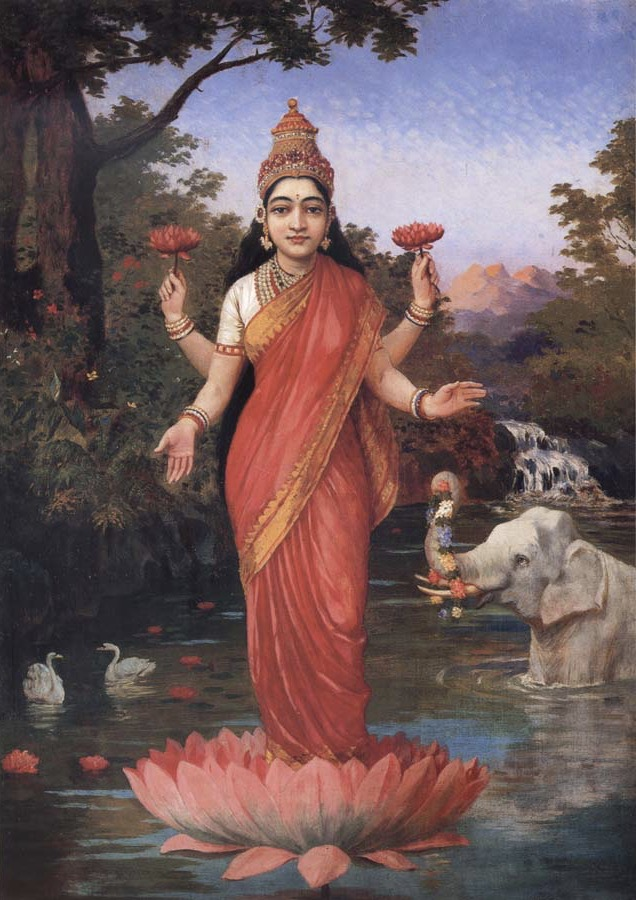
Lakshmi, among the most popular manifestations of Shakti

=== Shakti ===
Shakti is the supreme goddess in Shaktism, the goddess-centric sect of Hinduism. Both a supreme being and an energy that is considered to be the source of all works of creation, preservation and destruction, Adi Parashakti is held by Shaktas to be the source of the Trimurti, the universe and all of creation. She is regarded to have assumed many incarnations to fight with demons, including Parvati, wife of Shiva, Lakshmi, wife of Vishnu, the complete avatar of Shakti herself, according to the Devi Gita and Durga Saptashati, the main scriptures for Shakti worshipers. As the goddess Parvati, she is considered to be the most powerful of all deities.

Sometimes, the gods worship Parvati, who came before them in different avatars:

- Durga, who killed the demon Mahishasura
- Kali, the most ferocious form of the Goddess, who can not be pacified by anyone after war.
- Chandi, the gentle manifestation of Durga or Kali, who killed Mahishasura in the battle of Alkapuri.
- Kanyakumari, who killed Banasura
- Chamunda, who killed Chanda and Munda
- Kaushiki, who killed Shumbha and Nishumbha
- Minakshi, who defeated all the demigods and destroyed the arrogance of all demigods.

Shakti is usually depicted as having the weapons of all the gods, including those of the Trimurti. She holds the trishula of Shiva, the chakra of Vishnu, the Vajra of Indra, and the gada of Yama.

== Celestial weapons ==
An astra is a powerful celestial weapon or missile that is to be hurled at an enemy. Generally astra is in form of an arrow. Astras can be invoked using incantations (mantras). Different astras have different power. A Shastra is a personal weapon like swords, bows, spades, axes, spears and maces which must be constantly operated by a warrior.

- Brahmastra: Embedded with the mystical force of Brahma, this weapon releases millions of missiles, great fires and a destructive potential capable of extinguishing all creation, if not used by and aimed only at a celestial fighter. It was used multiple times in the Ramayana, Indrajit used it against Hanuman, Lakshmana asked permission to use it against Indrajit, which Rama declined, Lakshmana used it to kill Atikaya, Rama used it as final arrow to kill Ravana. In the epic the Mahabharata, it is said that the weapon manifest with the single head of Brahma as its tip. In the Mahabharata era Parashurama, Bhishma, Drona, Karna, Kripa, Ashwatthama, Arjuna, Yudhishtira, Satyaki and many other Maharathis also possessed the knowledge to invoke this missile.
- Brahmashirsha astra: A weapon capable of greater destruction than the Brahmastra. "It blazes up with terrible flames within a huge sphere of fire. Numerous peals of thunder were heard, thousands of meteors fell and all living creatures became terrified with great dread. The entire sky seemed to be filled with noise and assumed a terrible aspect with flames of fire. The whole earth with her mountains and waters and trees trembled." When it strikes an area it will cause complete destruction and nothing will ever grow, not even a blade of grass for the next 12 years. It will not rain for 12 years in that area and everything including metal and earth becomes poisoned.
- Brahmanda astra: This is the most powerful weapon of Brahma. It was first used by sage Vashishtha against Vishwamitra's (who was King Vishwarath at that time) Brahmashirsha, as only Brahmanda astra can stop Brahmashirsha astra, it was also used by sage Piplad against Shani to avenge his father's death. Karna, Bhisma and Drona were the only warriors in the Mahabharata who possessed the knowledge of this weapon.
- Pashupatastra: In Hinduism, the Pashupatastra is considered to be the most devastating weapon, as it is the weapon of the consort of Mahadeva, i.e. Mahakali. Mahadeva literally means "Highest of all gods" and Mahakali means "Goddess who is beyond time". This weapon was granted to Arjuna by Shiva. It is the most destructive and foreboding weapon. It was first used by Shiva for the destruction of tripura. It is capable of destroying the entire multiverse. In the Ramayana, Vishvamitra possessed this mighty weapon. In the Mahabharata, only Arjuna possessed this weapon.
- Narayanastra: Invincible and painful, this astra is unconquerable except by total submission, this astra was used by Krishna against Shiva when Shiva was fighting on behalf of the evil Banasura, when Shiva charged his personal Pashupatastra on Krishna, Krishna used this to make Shiva fall asleep, allowing him to move past him and cut off Banasura's arms, but at the request of Shiva, he does not kill Banasura.
- Vaishnavastra: One of the most powerful astras, this cannot be stopped by anyone except its creator, Vishnu. The Vaishnavastra is the most powerful astra in the universe along with the Narayanastra. The personal missile weapon of Krishna, once fired, it cannot be thwarted by any means, save by the will of Vishnu Himself. Rama and Krishna possessed this weapon.
- Nagastra: The snake weapon used by Indrajit against Rama and Lakshmana, used by Karna against Arjuna.
- Nagapasham: is the celestial weapon equal to "Nagastra".
- Garudastra:The eagle weapon to counter against the Nagastra.
- Anjalikastra: The personal weapon of Indra. This is the astra used by Arjuna to killed Karna in the Mahabharata war.
- Ramabanam (Ramastra): Created by Ram, and was used to kill the Ravana in Ramayana. It cannot be countered by any weapon and could not be stopped by anyone except Rama.
- Bhargavastra: Created by Parashurama, he gave it to his disciple Karna.It was used by Karna in the kurukshetra war.This weapon killed 1 akshoni of the Pandava army and was considered unstoppable by any means. In mahabharata only parashurama and Karna possessed knowledge of this weapon.
- Parvatastra: one of the most dangerous weapon, once it used mountains from sky fall in to the earth.
- Vasavi Shakti: The magical dart weapon of Indra, unfailing at executing its target. Indra granted it to Karna during the Kurukshetra war, in Mahabharata it was used by Karna to kill Ghatotkacha.
- Vajra: The thunderbolt weapon of Indra, who is the God of thunder and lightning, akin to Zeus and Jupiter. In, the Rigveda, it is stated that it was fashioned by Tvashtar. In the Puranas, the vajra stated to be made from the bones of sage Dadhichi. In all versions, it was used by Indra to slay serpent called Vritra. In the Mahabharata, Indra gave the Vajra to his son Arjuna. Apart from Indra, only Arjuna possessed it.
- Agneyastra: The fire weapon, created by Agni, god of fire
- Varunastra: The water weapon, created by Varuna, god of the oceans
- Vayavastra: The wind weapon, created by Vayu
- Samvarta: Weapon belonging to Yama used by Bharata to annihilate thirty million Gandharvas in a moment, tearing them to pieces.
- Sammohanastra: Would cause entire hosts/armies to collapse in a trance. It was used in the Mahabharata by Arjuna the entire army of Hastinapur.
- Twashtastra: When used against a group of opponents (such as an army), would cause them to mistake each other for enemies and fight each other.
- Suryastra: Create a dazzling light that would dispel any darkness about and dry up water bodies. Arjuna had this weapon and used against Shakuni on 12th day of war.
- Sabda-vedi astra: This weapon prevents an opponent from turning invisible. Used by Arjuna against the Gandharva king Chitrasena.
- Gandharvastra: Created by Gandharva King Chitrasena. He gave it to Arjuna.
- Mayastra: Dispel any form of maya or sorcery in the vicinity. It was possessed by Arjuna.
- Manavastra: Created by Manu, it could overcome supernatural protections and carry the target hundreds of miles away. Can inspire humane traits in an evil being. This weapon was used by Rama on Maricha. On the 14th day of Kurukshetra war, Arjuna invoked this weapon. But, before he could release it from his bow, Karna broke the arrow. Arjuna couldn't reinvoke it as it would have led to his own death.
- Bhaumastra: Created by Goddess Bhumi Devi, the weapon could create tunnels deep into the earth and summon jewels.
- Indrastra: Created by the God Indra, it would bring about a 'shower' of arrows from the sky.
