= Dhanyamalini =

Second wife of Ravana

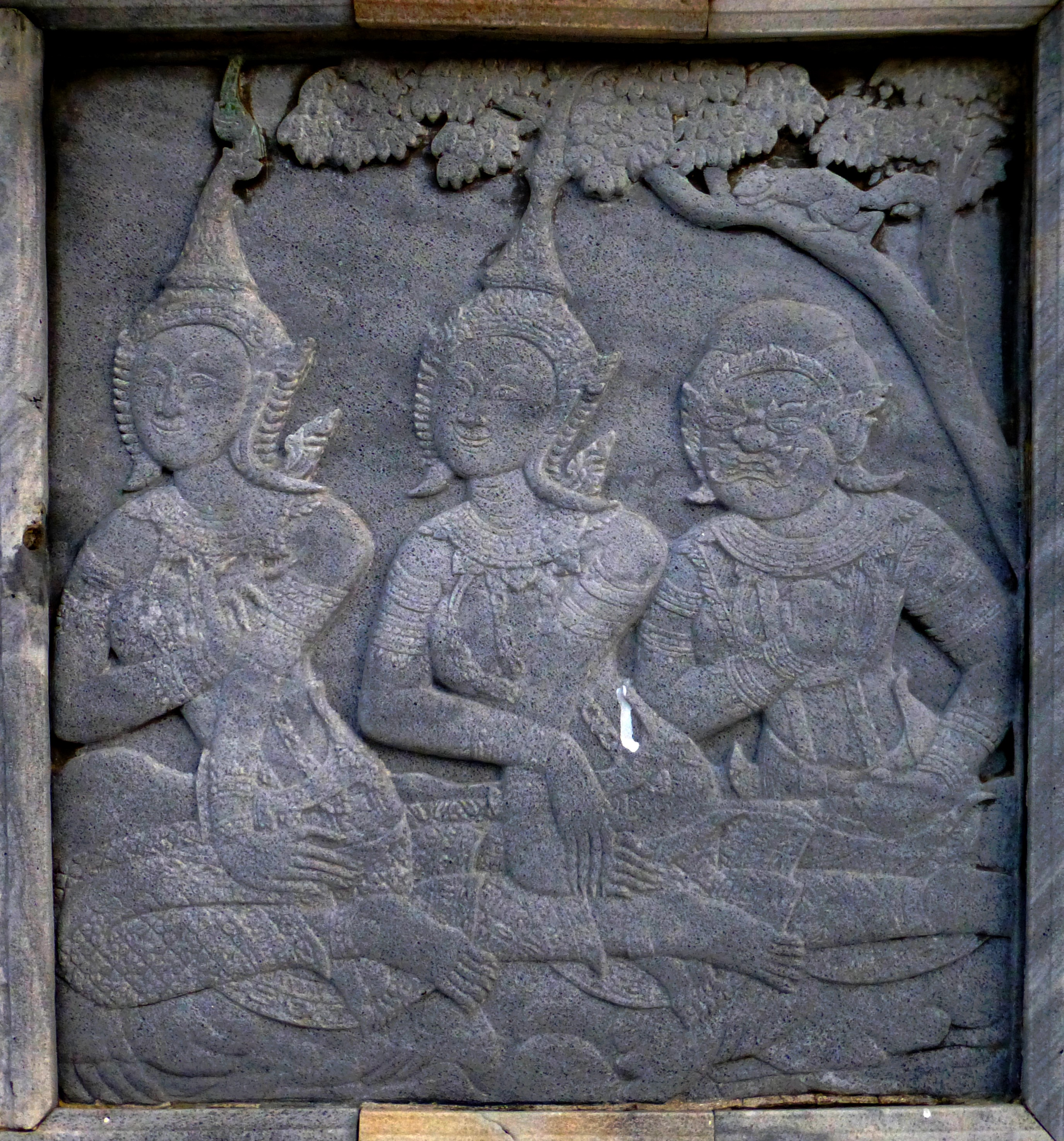
- Dhanyamalini (centre) and Mandodari (left) with their sister-in-law Shurpanakha (right); a scene from the Ramakien in Wat Suthat, Bangkok.
- Affiliation: Rakshasa
- Abode: Lanka

Genealogy
- Spouse: Ravana
- Children: Narantaka, Devantaka, Atikaya and Trishira (versions of Ramayana)

Dhanyamalini wife of Ravana in Thai art.
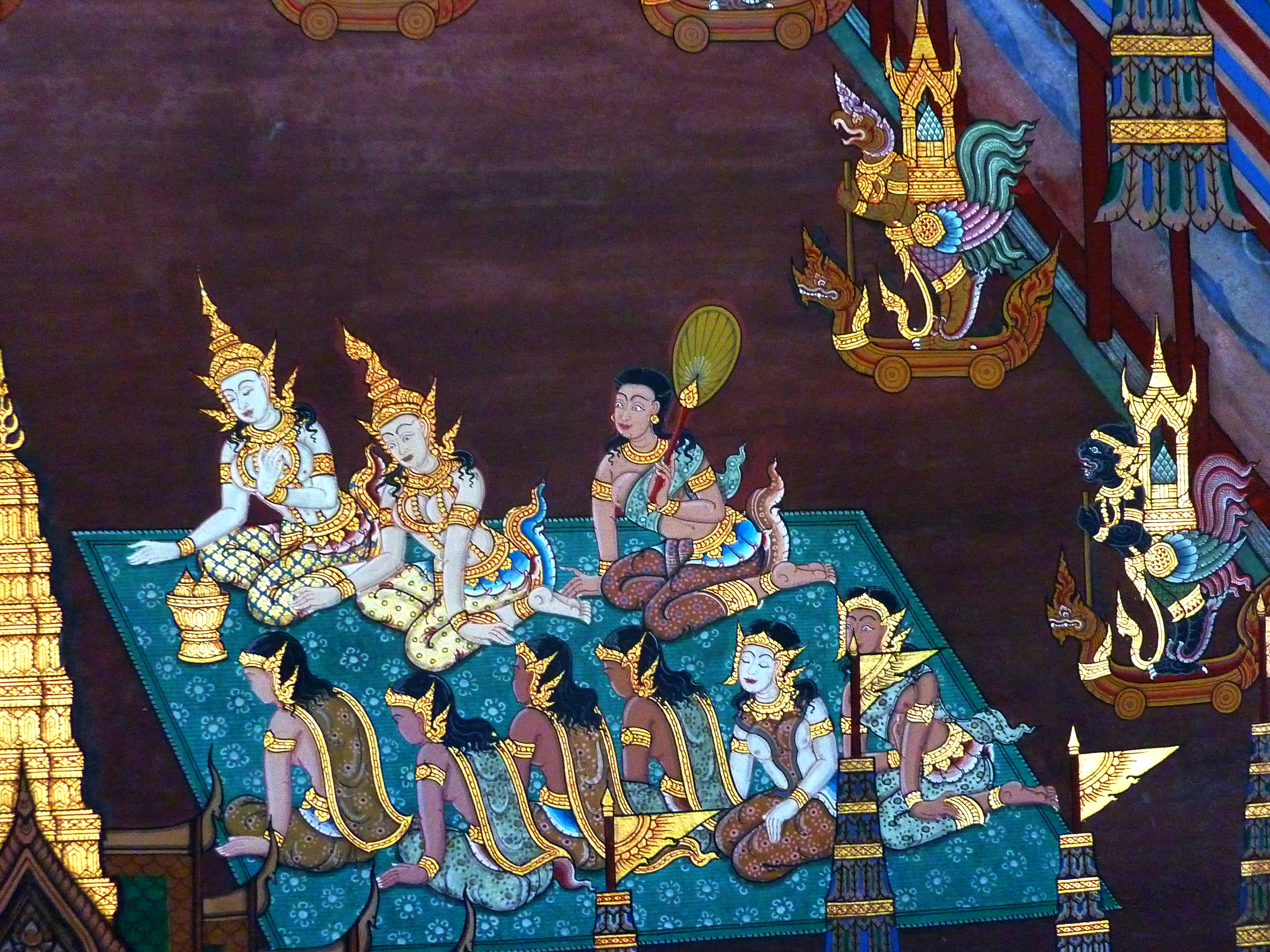
Mandodari (Left) and Dhanyamala (right) with attendant concubine in the funeral of Ravana., a scene from the Ramakien in Wat Phra Kaew, Bangkok.

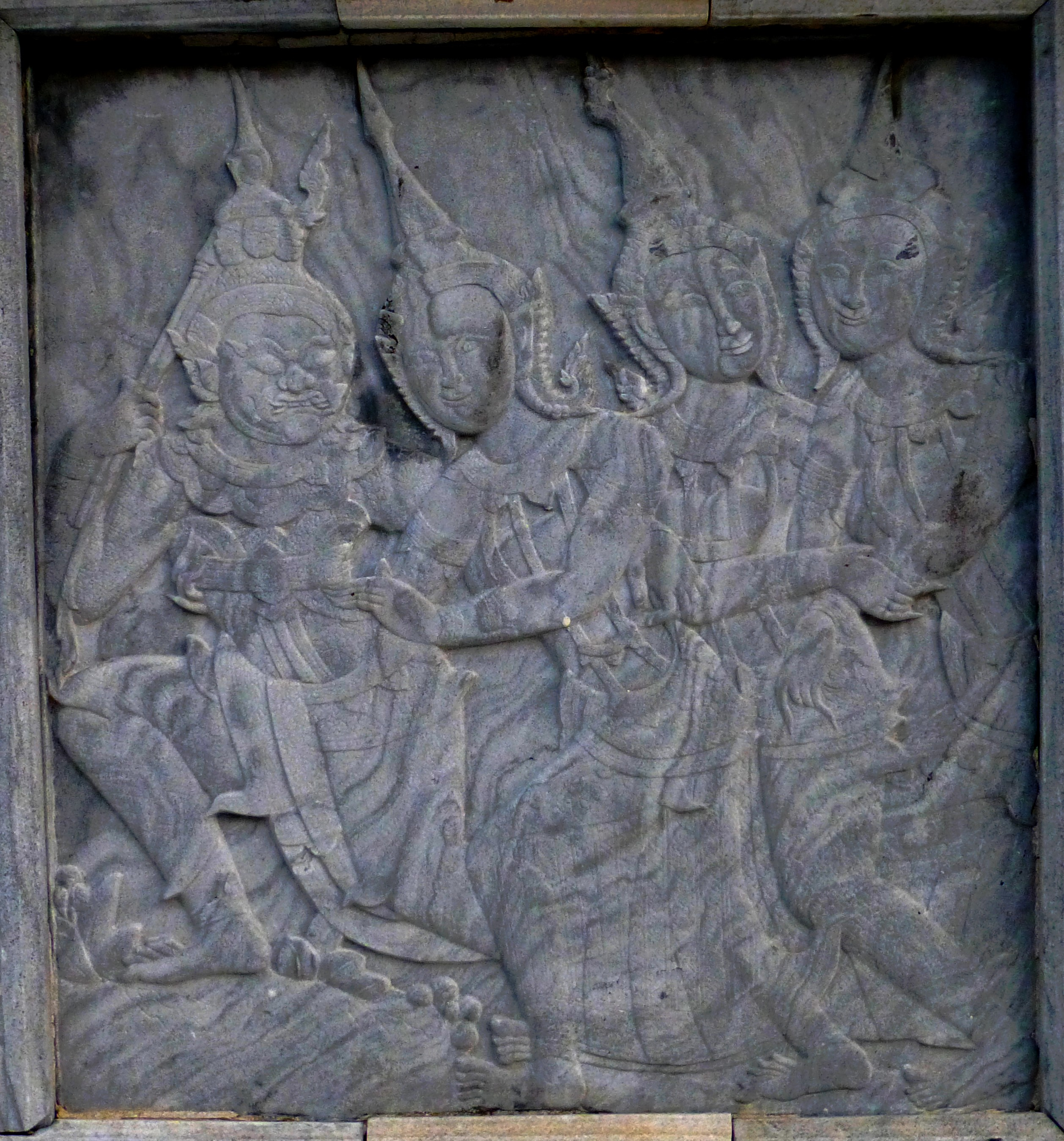
Ravana helps his wife, Mandodari (left), Dhanyamalini (middle) and concubine (right) escape a fire in Lanka; a scene from the Ramakien in Wat Suthat, Bangkok.

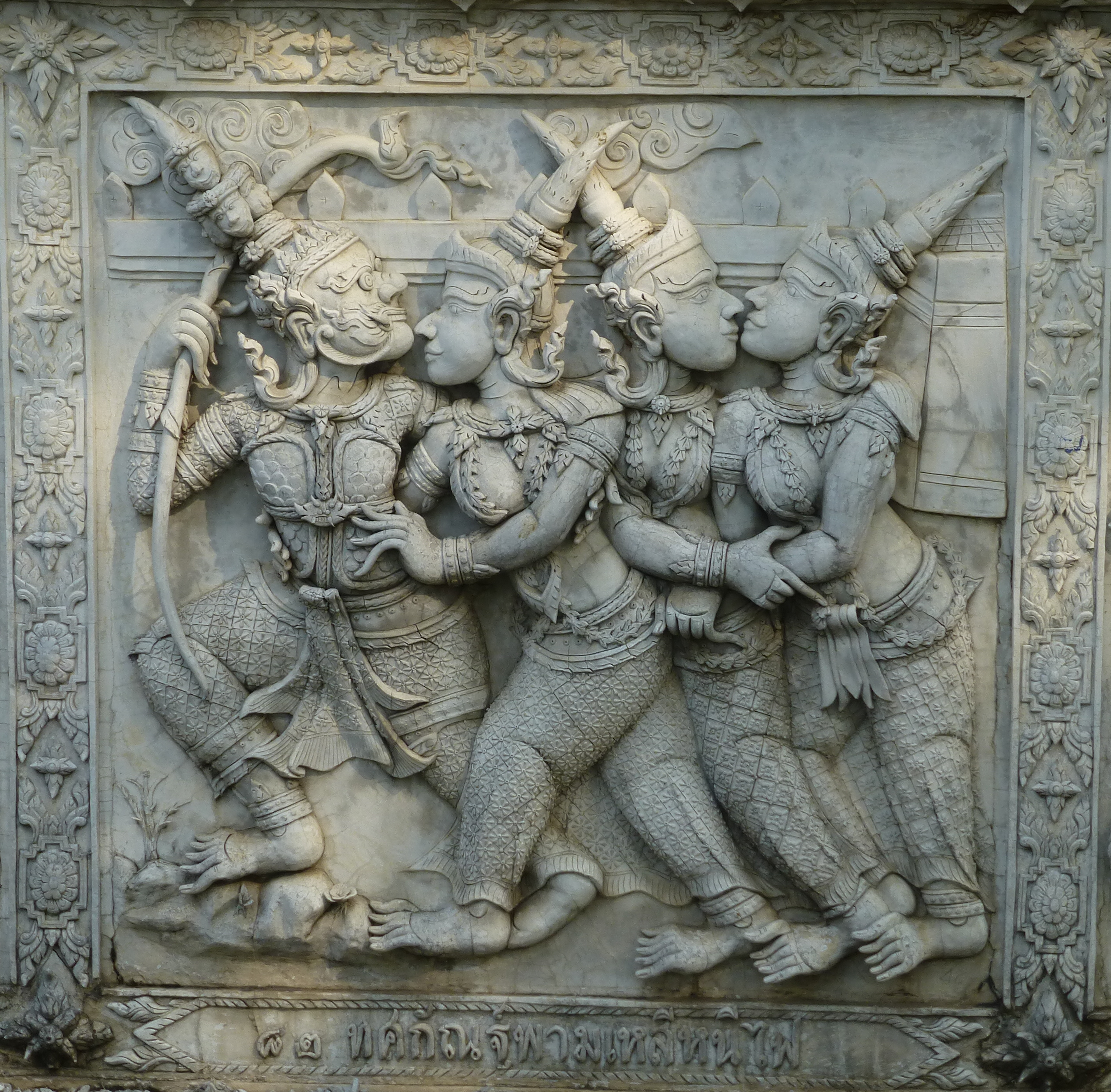
Ravana helps his wife, Mandodari (left), Dhanyamalini (middle) and concubine (right) escape a fire in Lanka; a scene from the Ramakien in Wat Phanan Choeng, Ayutthaya.

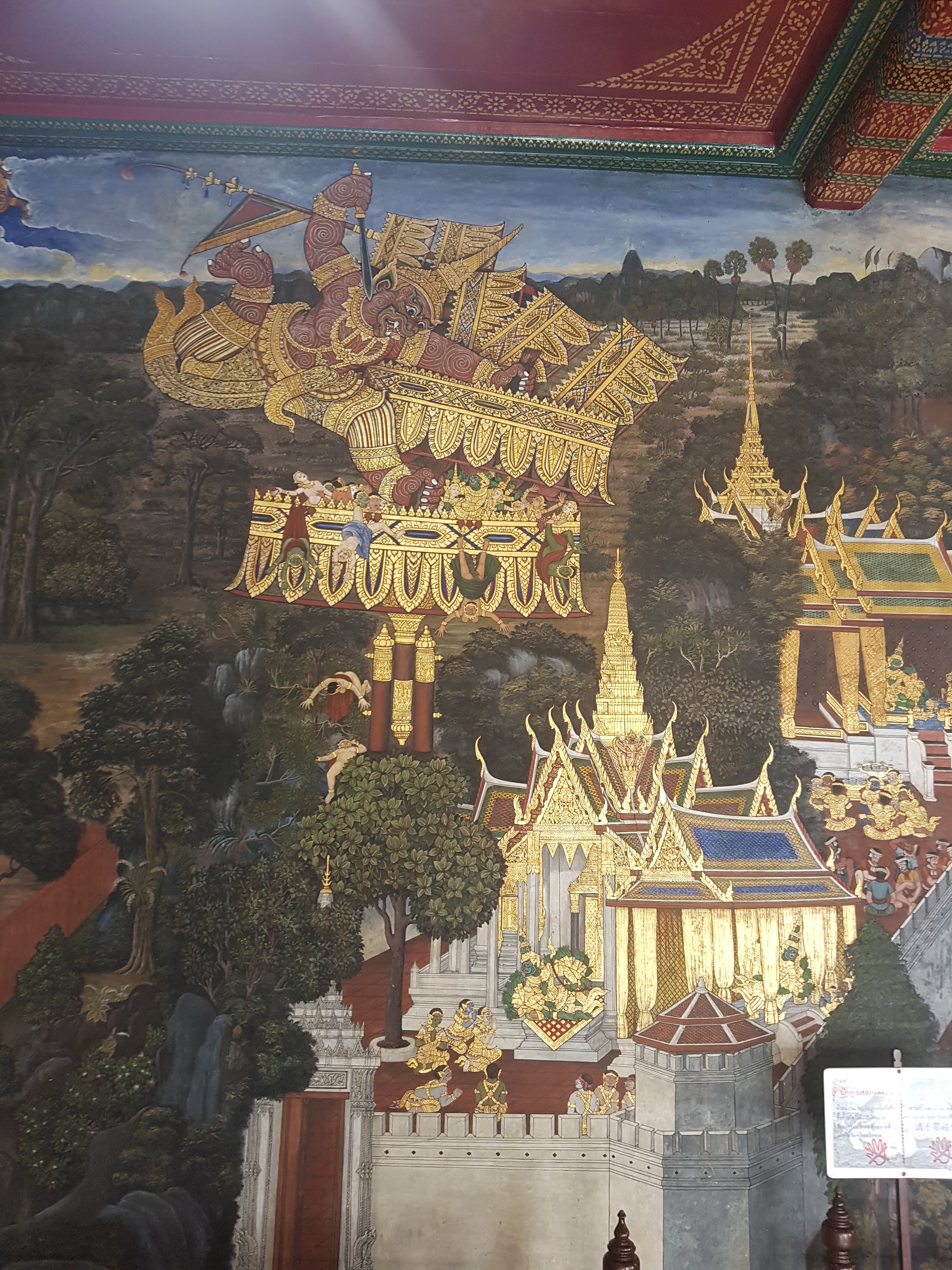
Sugriva destroys Chatra of Lanka while Ravana hugs his wife Mandodari (left) and Dhanyamalini (right); a scene from the Ramakien in Wat Phra Kaew, Bangkok.

Dhanyamalini, also referred to as Dhanyamala and Dhanyamali, is one of the thousand junior wives of Ravana, the antagonist of the Hindu epic Ramayana. She appears rarely in the epic and is famous as the mother of Atikaya. In some other versions of the Ramayana, Dhanyamali had three sons from Ravana — Narantaka, Devantaka, and Trishira.
