= Kuzhanthai =

Kuzhanthai may refer to:

- Kuzhanthai Velappar temple
- Pulavar Kuzhanthai
- En Purushan Kuzhanthai Maathiri
- Kuzhanthai Ullam
