= Narantaka-Devantaka =

Hindu asuras

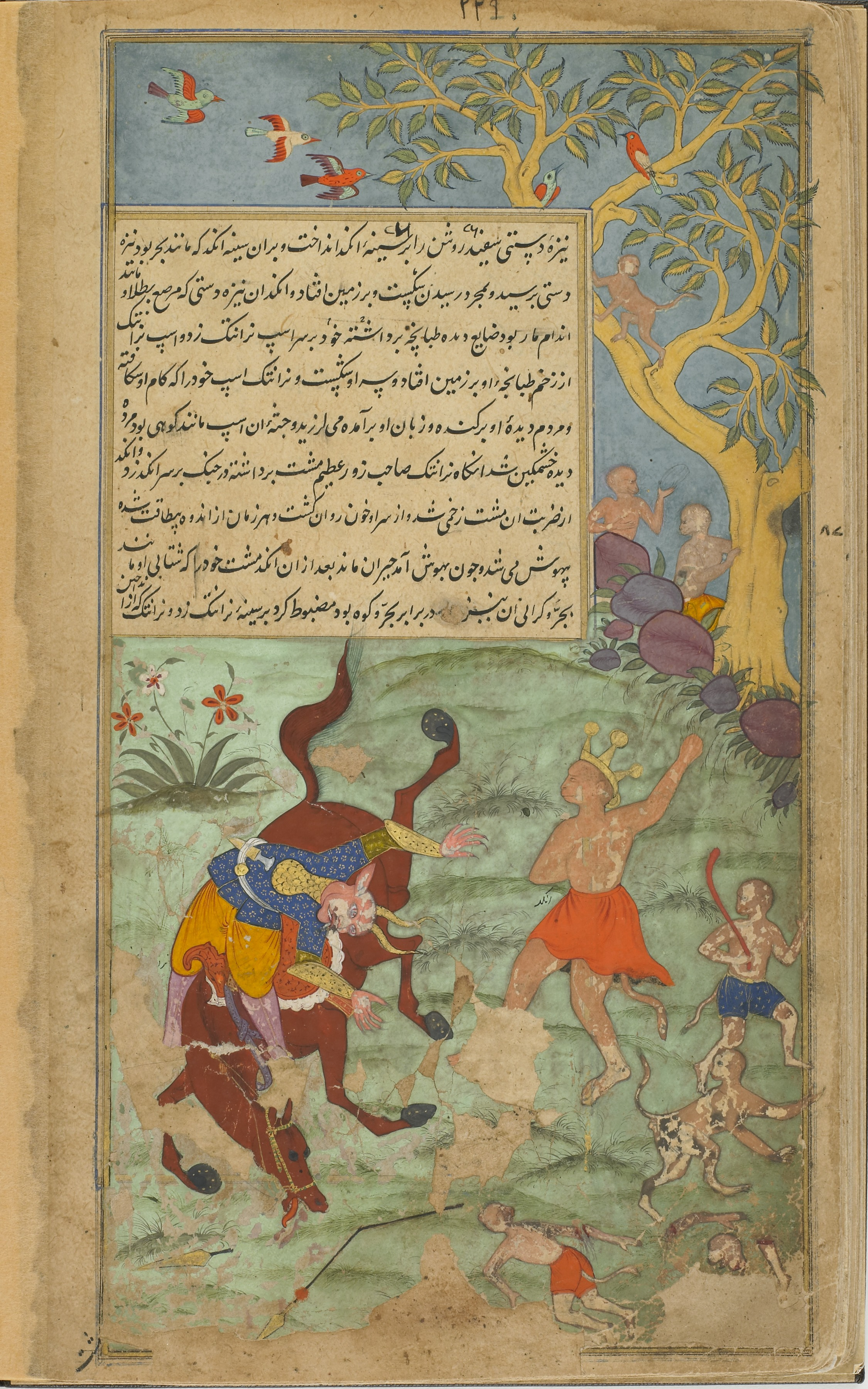
- Angada smites the demon Narantaka

Genealogy
- Parents: Ravana (father); Dhanyamalini (mother)
- Siblings: Atikaya; Trishira

Narantaka (Sanskrit: नरान्तक, IAST: narāntaka, lit. destroyer of men), not to be confused with son of asura Rudraketu, and Devanataka (Sanskrit: देवान्तक, IAST: devāntaka, lit. destroyer of Gods) are asuras and sons of Ravana who appear in the epic of Ramayana. They, along with Atikaya, were the offspring of Ravana and his second wife Dhanyamalini. In the battle of Ramayana, Narantaka was killed by Angada, the son of Bali, whereas Devantaka was slaughtered by the Mace of Hanuman in a duel. This duel is mentioned in the Yuddha Kanda, chapter 69 of Valmiki Ramayana.
