= Paraswadi =

Village in Maharashtra

- village
- Location in Maharashtra, India Paraswadi (India)
- Coordinates: 19.9849516°N 72.8131432°E
- Country: India
- State: Maharashtra
- District: Palghar
- Taluka: Dahanu
- Elevation: 24 m (79 ft)

Population (2011)
  - Total: 1,399
- Time zone: UTC+5:30 (IST)
- ISO 3166 code: IN-MH
- 2011 census code: 551604

Paraswadi is a village in the Palghar district of Maharashtra, India. It is located in the Dahanu taluka.

== Demographics ==
According to the 2011 census of India, Paraswadi has 241 households. The effective literacy rate (i.e. the literacy rate of population excluding children aged 6 and below) is 36.75%.

Demographics (2011 Census)
	Total	Male	Female
Population	1399	688	711
Children aged below 6 years	256	140	116
Scheduled caste	0	0	0
Scheduled tribe	1392	684	708
Literates	420	243	177
Workers (all)	715	371	344
Main workers (total)	685	360	325
Main workers: Cultivators	329	172	157
Main workers: Agricultural labourers	249	117	132
Main workers: Household industry workers	1	1	0
Main workers: Other	106	70	36
Marginal workers (total)	30	11	19
Marginal workers: Cultivators	6	2	4
Marginal workers: Agricultural labourers	16	6	10
Marginal workers: Household industry workers	1	0	1
Marginal workers: Others	7	3	4
Non-workers	684	317	367

== Culture ==
Every year on Dussehra, the Gondi villagers of Paraswadi celebrate by holding a procession where they carry an image of Ravana riding on an elephant, as they claim that he was their ancestor-king.
