= Pulavar Kuzhanthai =

Indian poet and writer (1906–1972)

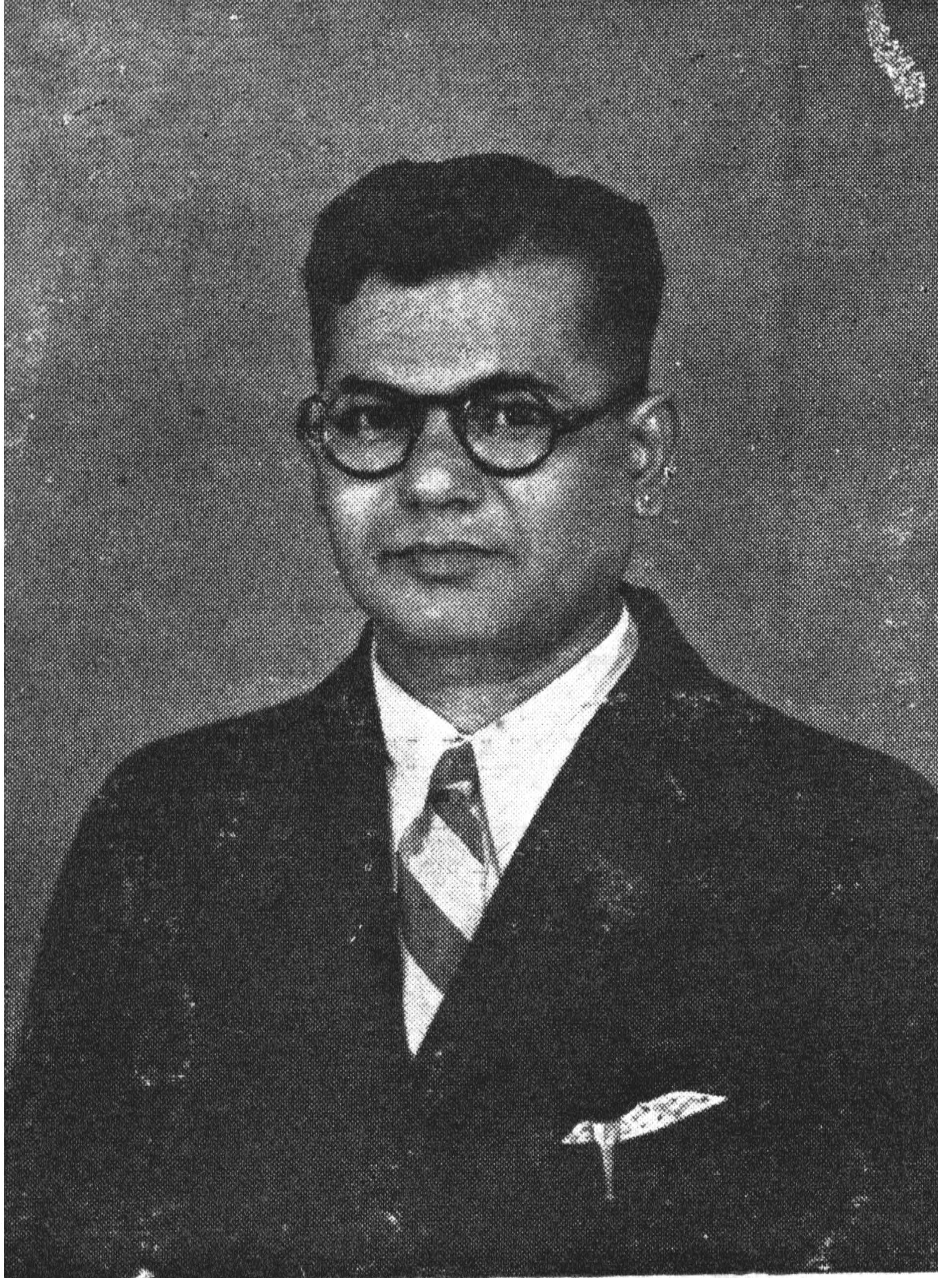
- Picture of Pulavar Kuzhanthai in 1946
- Born: 1 July 1906; Erode
- Died: 22 September 1972 (aged 66)
- Education: Madras University
- Occupations: Poet, writer
- Spouse: Muthammai
- Children: Samathuvam, Samarasam
- Writing career
- Period: 1934
- Literary movement: Dravidian movement

Pulavar Kuzhanthai (1 July 1906 – 22 September 1972) was an Indian poet and writer in the Tamil language. He has written many Tamil books in prose and poetry form. Kuzhanthai was inspired by the Dravidian movement, Periyar E. V. Ramasamy and Annadurai C N.

== Ravana Kaaviyam ==
His epic, Ravana Kaaviyam (1946) is a panegyric on Ravana. The book is made of 3100 poetic stanzas in which Ravana is the protagonist. The book was banned by the then ruling Congress government. The ban was lifted only in 1971 by M. Karunanidhi, the then Chief Minister of Tamil Nadu.

== Nationalisation of works ==
In 2006, the Government of Tamil Nadu gave ₹. 500,000 to Kuzhanthai's heir and nationalised his literary works, meaning they are now in public domain.
