= Ravana =

Primary antagonist in the Hindu epic Ramayana

- Illustration depicting Ravana in battle
- Devanagari: रावण
- Sanskrit transliteration: Rāvaṇa
- Affiliation: Shaivism, Rakshasa
- Predecessor: Kubera
- Successor: Vibhishana
- Abode: Lanka
- Mount: Pushpaka Vimana
- Texts: Ramayana and its versions

Genealogy
- Parents: Vishrava (father); Kaikasi (mother)
- Siblings: Kumbhakarna (younger brother); Vibhishana (younger brother); Shurpanakha (younger sister)
- Spouse: Mandodari (chief-queen); Dhanyamalini and a thousand junior wives
- Children: Meghanada; Atikaya; Akshayakumara; Narantaka; Devantaka; Trishira; Prahasta (sons)

Ravana (Sanskrit: रावण, romanized: Rāvaṇa, lit. 'roaring') is the principal antagonist of the ancient Hindu epic Ramayana and its several other versions. He is traditionally depicted as a ten-headed rakshasa (demon) king of Lanka. In the Ramayana, Ravana is described as the eldest son of sage Vishrava and Kaikasi. He abducted Rama's wife, Sita, and took her to his kingdom of Lanka, where he held her in the Ashoka Vatika. Rama, with the support of vanara King Sugriva and his army of vanaras, launched a rescue operation for Sita against Ravana in Lanka. Ravana was subsequently slain, and Rama rescued his beloved wife Sita. His epic defeat is celebrated yearly by burning a large effigy, depicting the ten-headed Ravana, during the Hindu festival of Dussehra.

Ravana was well-versed in the six shastras and the four Vedas, including the Shiva Tandava Stotra. Ravana is also considered to be an ardent devotee of Shiva. Images of Ravana are often seen associated with Shiva at temples. He also appears in the Buddhist Mahayana text Laṅkāvatāra Sūtra, in Buddhist Jatakas, as well as in Jain Ramayanas. In Vaishnava scriptures, he is depicted as one of Vishnu's cursed doorkeepers.

== Etymology ==
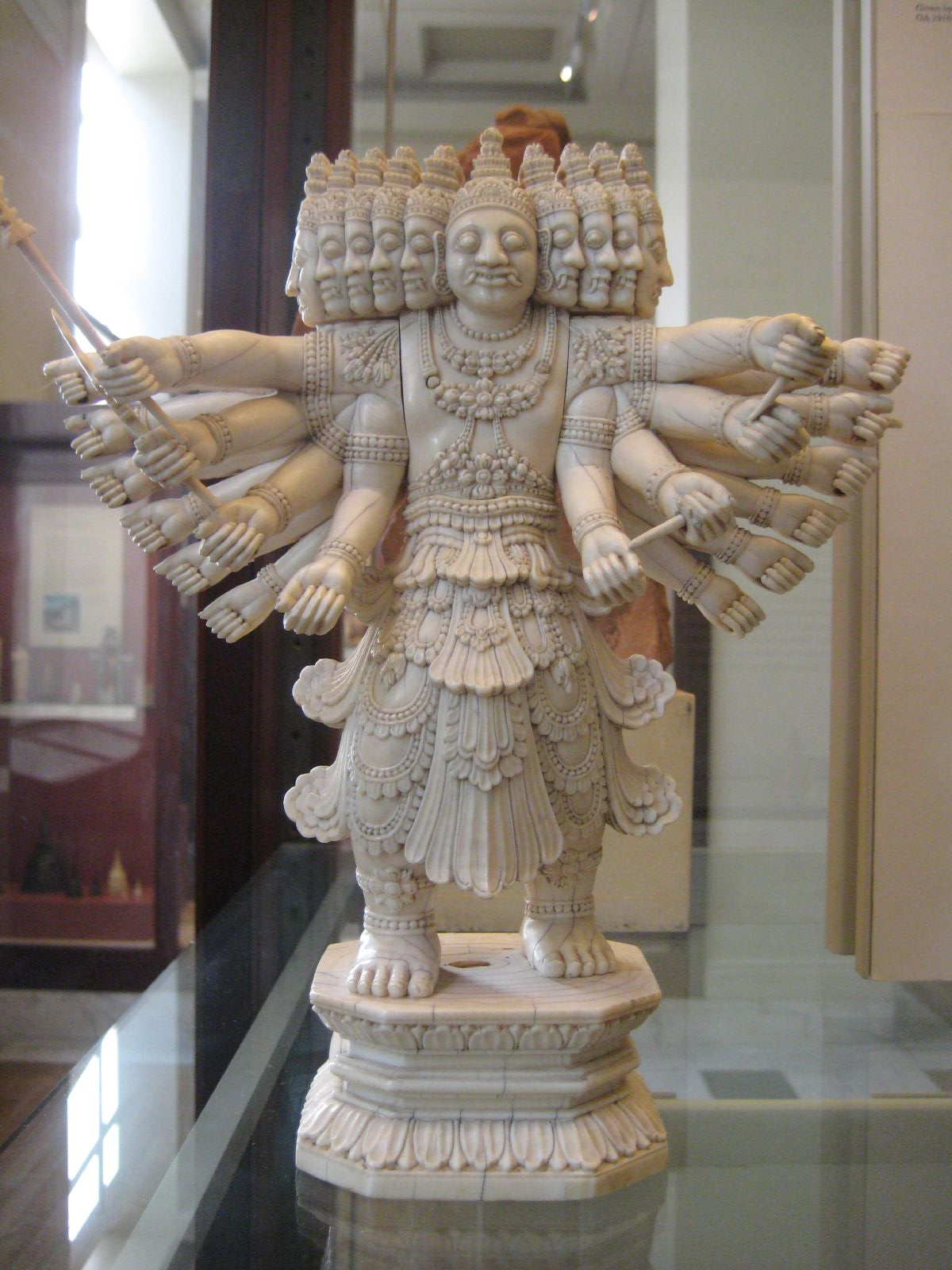
Statue of Ravana, South India, 18th century CE, British Museum

The word Rāvaṇa (Sanskrit: रावण) means "Roaring" (active), the opposite of Vaiśravaṇa which means to "hear distinctly" (passive). Both Ravana and Vaiśravaṇa, who is commonly known as Kubera, are considered to be patronymics derived from "sons of Vishrava".

Dashānana was a title later taken on by Ravana, and it means "the one with ten (dasha) Heads (anana)". Further, roravana is Sanskrit for "loud roaring." In Abhinava Gupta's Krama Shaiva scripture, yāsām rāvanam is used as an expression to mean people who are truly aware of the materialism of their environment.

Ravana is also known by several other names including Dasis Ravana, Dasis Sakvithi Maha Ravana, Dashaanan, Ravula, Lankapati, Lankeshwara, Ravanasura and Ravanaeshwara.

== Iconography ==
Ravana is depicted and described as having ten heads, although he is sometimes shown with only nine heads since he cut one off to convince Shiva. He is described as a devout follower of Shiva, a great scholar, a capable ruler, and a maestro of the Veena. Ravana is also depicted as the author of the Ravana Samhita, a book on Hindu astrology. Beyond his role in the epic Ramayana, he is revered in the Ayurvedic tradition as a pioneer of pharmaceutical science (Bhaishajya Kalpana).

He is credited as the author of the Arka Prakasha, a foundational Sanskrit compendium on the science of distillation. In this text, Ravana describes the extraction of volatile oils and aromatic essences which is a method used to preserve the Virya (potency) of plants that might otherwise be degraded by standard decoction (Kwatha) methods. Additionally, traditional accounts attribute works on Ayurvedic Alchemy (Rasashastra) and pulse diagnosis (Nadi Pariksha) to him, establishing his significance within the Vedic medical lineage. In some later versions, he is said to have possessed the nectar of immortality, which was stored inside his belly thanks to a celestial boon from Brahma. In the War with Lord Rama, Ravana was killed by a powerful Brahma's weapon shot by Rama which was gifted to Rama by Sage Agstya.

== Biography ==
=== Birth ===
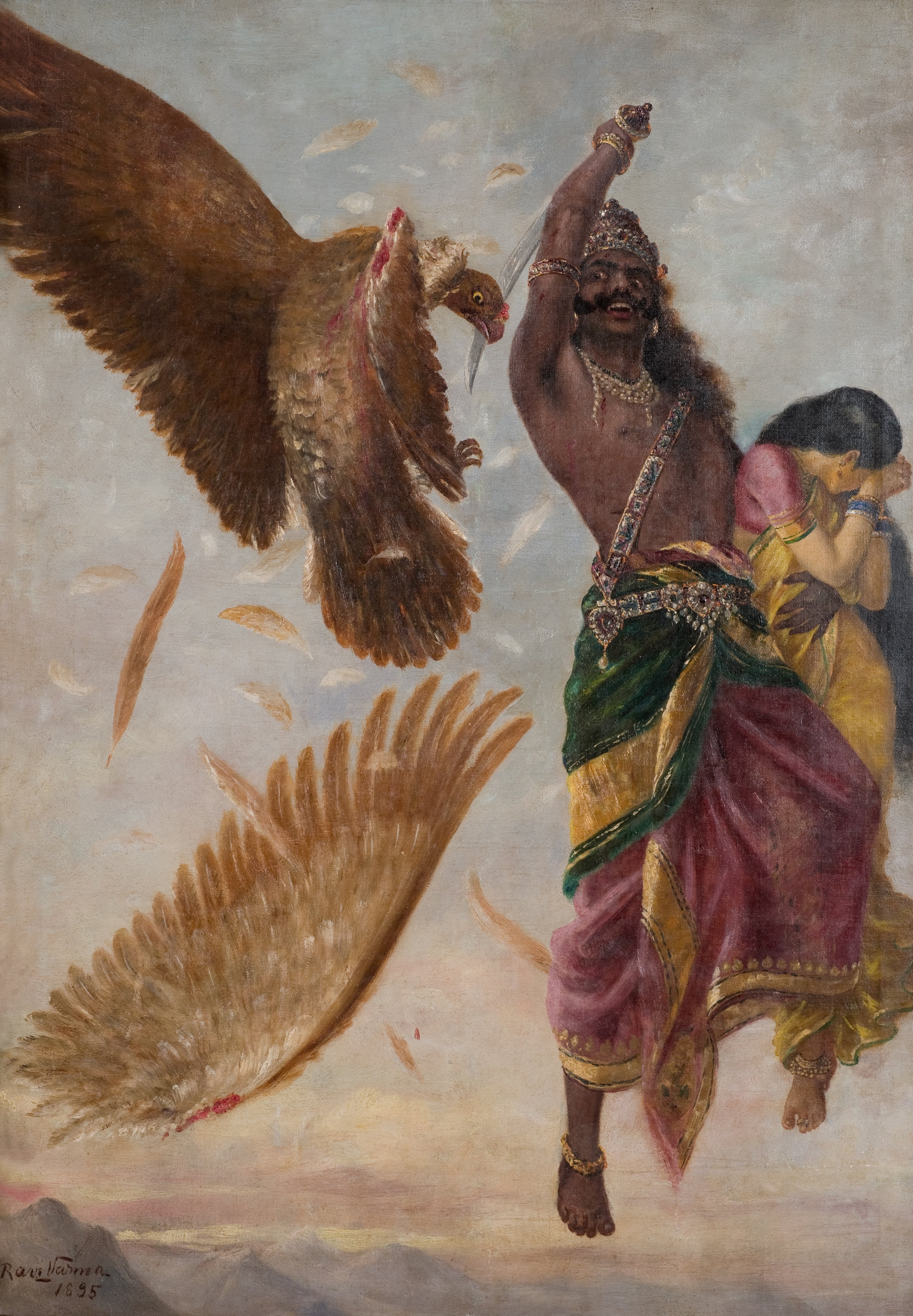
Painting depicting Ravana cutting off Jatayu's wing while abducting Sita, by Raja Ravi Varma

Ravana was born to the Brahmin sage Vishrava and the Daitya princess Kaikasi in Treta Yuga. Villagers from Chapra in Bihar claim that Chapra was named after Vishrava, and that Ravana was born there.

Ravana's paternal grandfather, the sage Pulastya, was one of the ten Prajapatis, or mind-born sons of Brahma, and one of the Saptarishi (seven great sages) in the first Manvantara (age of Manu). His maternal grandfather was Sumali (or Sumalaya), the king of the Rakshasas and the son of Sukesha. Sumali had ten sons and four daughters. Sumali wished for Kaikasi to marry the most powerful being in the mortal world, so as to produce an exceptional heir. He rejected the kings of the world, as they were less powerful than him. Kaikasi searched among the sages and finally chose Vishrava, the father of Kubera. Ravana and his siblings were born to the couple and they completed their education from their father, with Ravana being a great scholar of the Vedas.

=== Birth in Sri Lankan tradition and folklore ===
In Sri Lankan folklore, classical Sinhala chronicles, and local cultural traditions, Ravana is widely regarded as a native monarch of ancient Lanka rather than solely a figure of mainland Indian mythology. According to local oral traditions and Sinhalese literary works such as the Rajavaliya and folk narratives like the Ravanavaliya (Ravana Kathawa), Ravana belonged to the indigenous Yaksha clan through his maternal grandfather, King Sumali, and was born and raised on the island after his father, Sage Vishrava, settled in Lanka and married Princess Kaikesi.

Within Sri Lankan heritage, Ravana is portrayed not merely as an antagonist, but as a scholar, a master of Ayurveda and traditional medicine, a skilled musician credited with inventing the ravanahattha, and an advanced ruler who governed a prosperous civilization. Numerous geographical landmarks across Sri Lanka—including Sigiriya, Ravana Falls (Ravana Ella), Lakegala, and locations within the Seethawaka region—are closely associated with legends of his reign and legacy.

=== Boon from Brahma ===
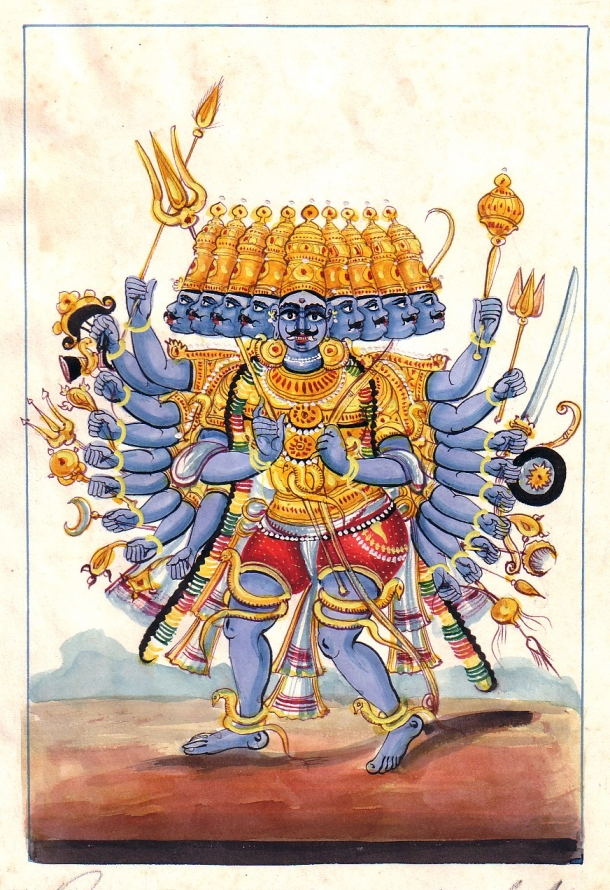
Illustration depicting Ravana, circa 1920

Ravana and his two brothers, Kumbhakarna and Vibhishana, performed penance on Mount Gokarna for 10,000 years and won boons from Brahma. Ravana was blessed with a boon that would make him invincible to all the creations of Brahma, except for humans. He also received weapons, a chariot, as well as the ability to shapeshift from Brahma. According to the Ramayana, demigods approached Brahma since Ravana was causing harm on Earth. Lord Vishnu appeared and gave blessings that Rama would incarnate as a human and kill Ravana since his invincibility boon did not include humans.

=== Devotee of Shiva ===
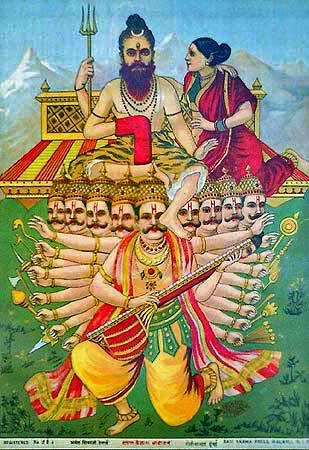
Ravananugraha theme

One of the most popular images of Shiva is called "Ravananugraha", which was popular in the Gupta era. It depicts Ravana beneath Mount Kailash playing a veena made out of his head and hands, and strings made out of his tendons, while Shiva and Parvati sit on top of the mountain. According to scriptures, Ravana once tried to lift Mount Kailash, but Shiva pushed the mountain into place and trapped Ravana beneath it. For a thousand years, the imprisoned Ravana sang Shiva Tandava Stotra, a hymn in praise of Shiva, who finally blessed him and granted him an invincible sword and a powerful linga (Shiva's iconic symbol, Atmalinga) to worship. But this incident has little to no evidence in Valmiki Ramayana.

=== Family ===
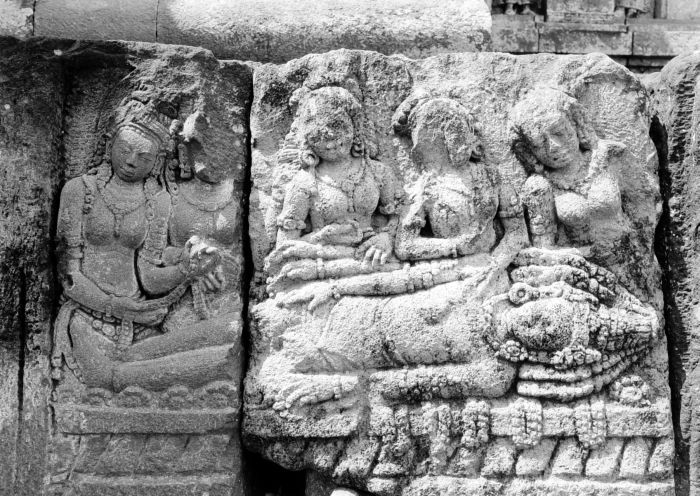
Queen Mandodari and the women of Lanka mourning the death of Ravana. Bas-relief of 9th century from Prambanan Temple, Java, Indonesia

Ravana's parents were the sage Vishrava (son of Pulastya) and Kaikesi (daughter of Sumali and Ketumati). Ravana had seventeen maternal uncles and three maternal aunts. Dhumraksha, Prahastha, Akampana, Vajramushti, Suparshwa and Virupaksha, a few of his maternal uncles, were generals in the Lanka army. The other grandsons of Sumali, through his other daughters, namely Khara, Dushana, Mahodara, and Mahaparshwa were equally powerful lieutenants in Ravana’s army, and given the first two were responsible to govern the territories of Janasthana. Kaikesi's father, Sumali and uncle, Malyavan were instrumental in making Ravana the king of Lanka by advising him to receive boons from Brahma, defeat Kubera, and establish rakshasa rule in the three worlds.

Ravana's granduncle was Malyavan, who opposed the war with Rama and Lakshmana. He also had another granduncle named Mali who was killed by Vishnu.

According to Sundara Kanda of Valmiki Ramayana, Ravana had over a thousand wives, with Mandodari, the daughter of the celestial architect Maya, being his chief queen. His sons were Meghanada, Atikaya, Akshayakumara, Narantaka, Devantaka and Trishira.

=== Priestly ministers ===
In some accounts, Ravana is said to have had Shukracharya, the priest of the Asuras, as his minister, and in other accounts, Brihaspati, the priest of the Devas.

One account narrates how Ravana ordered Brihaspati to recite the Chandi stava (mantras of Chandi), more specifically the Devi Mahatmya, in order to stave off defeat. According to the Krttivasa text, Ravana arranged for a peaceful yajna, and invited Brihaspati to start the recitation of Chandi.

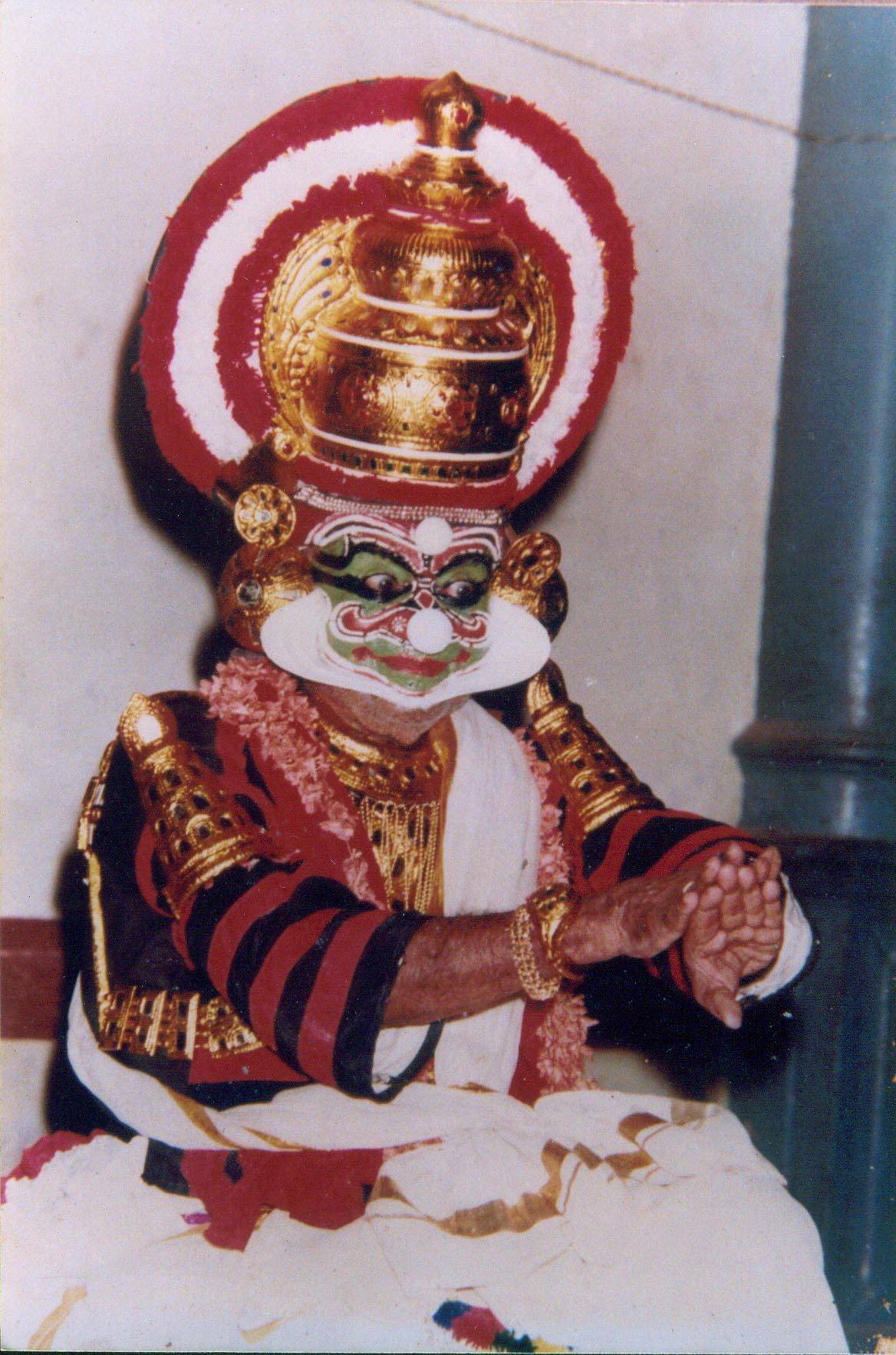
Ravana in Sanskrit drama of Kerala, India- Kutiyattam. Artist: Guru Nātyāchārya Māni Mādhava Chākyār

== Other legends ==
=== Vishnu's cursed doorkeeper ===
In the Bhagavata Purana, Ravana and his brother Kumbhakarna are said to be reincarnations of Jaya and Vijaya, gatekeepers at Vaikuntha (the abode of Vishnu), and were cursed to be born on Earth for their insolence.

These gatekeepers refused entry to the Sanatha Kumara monks who, because of their powers and austerity, appeared as young children. For their insolence, the monks cursed them to be expelled from Vaikuntha and to be born on Earth.

Vishnu agreed that they should be punished and gave them two options. First, that they could be born seven times as normal mortals and devotees of Vishnu, or be born three times as strong and powerful beings, but as enemies of Vishnu. Eager to be back with the Lord, they chose the latter option. The curse of the first birth was fulfilled by Hiranyakashipu and his brother Hiranyaksha in Satya Yuga, when they were both vanquished by earlier avatars of Vishnu (Hiranyaksha by Varaha, and Hiranyakashipu by Narasimha). Ravana and his brother Kumbhakarna were born to fulfill the curse in their second birth as enemies of Vishnu in Treta Yuga. The curse of the third birth was fulfilled by Dantavakra and Shishupala in the Dvapara Yuga, when they both were slain by Krishna, the eighth avatar.

=== Other conflicts ===
Ravana had fought with the demons named Nivatakavacha along with his army for an entire year but was unable to kill them due to Brahma's boon. The war was stopped by Brahma and Ravana formed an alliance with them, he learnt several magical tricks or maya from those demons.

Ravana had defeated the vanara warriors namely Hanuman, Sugriva, Neela and even Rama's brother Lakshmana twice during his war with Rama. As per the original six books of Valmiki Ramayana, only lord Rama the incarnation of Vishnu defeated Ravana and killed him after several days of single duel.

He killed Anaranya, the king of Ayodhya, although he cursed Ravana to be slain by Rama.

Ravana had wrestled his brother Kubera and vanquished him for the Pushpaka Vimana.

=== Immolation of Vedavati ===
Ravana found Vedavati sitting in meditation as a tapasvini and was captivated by her beauty. He proposed his hand in marriage to her, and was rejected. Ravana, firmly rejected at every turn, grabbed her hair and tried assaulting her. The furious Vedavati cursed Ravana that she would be born once more, and would be the cause of his death. She subsequently leapt into the ritual havan that was present in her vicinity, immolating herself.

=== Rape of Rambha ===
Ravana is regarded to have once caught sight of the apsara Rambha and was filled with lust. Even as the apsara resisted his advances by asserting that she was his daughter-in-law, he raped her. When she reported this to her husband, Nalakuvara, he cursed Ravana to be unable to cause violence to any woman who did not consent to being with him, his head splitting into a number of pieces if he did so. This incident is stated to explain why Ravana could not force the abducted Sita to submit to his desire.

== Worship and temples ==
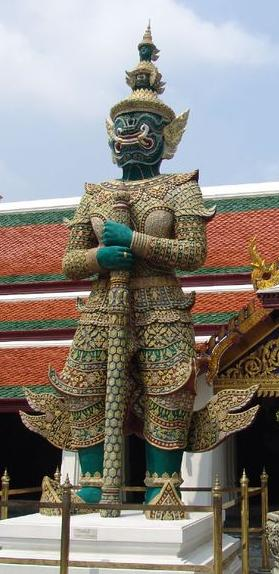
Thotsakan (Ravana)'s sculpture as a guardian of Wat Phra Kaew, Thailand

=== Worship ===
Ravana is worshipped as one of Shiva's most revered followers, and he is even worshipped in some Shiva temples.

King Shiv Shankar built a Ravana temple in Kanpur, Uttar Pradesh. The Ravana temple is open once a year, on the day of Dashera, to perform puja for the welfare of Ravana.

Ravana is also worshipped by Hindus of Bisrakh, who claim their town to be his birthplace.

The Sachora Brahmins of Gujarat claim to be descendants of Ravana, and sometimes have "Ravan" as their surnames.

Saraswat Brahmins from Mathura claim Ravana as a saraswat Brahmin as per his lineage.

The Gondi people of central India claim to be descendants of Ravana, and have temples for him, his wife Mandodari, and their son Meghnad. They also state that Ravana was an ancient Gond king, the tenth dharmaguru of their tribe, and the eighteenth lingo (divine teacher). Annually on Dussehra, the Gondis from the village of Paraswadi carry an image of Ravana riding on an elephant in a procession. He is also worshipped by the Nihali people.

=== Temples ===
The following temples in India are for Ravana as a Shiva Bhakta.

- Dashanan Temple, Kanpur, Uttar Pradesh
- Ravana Temple, Bisrakh, Greater Noida, Uttar Pradesh
- Kakinada Ravana Temple, Andhra Pradesh
- Ravangram Ravana Temple, Vidisha, Madhya Pradesh
- Mandsaur, Madhya Pradesh
- Mandore Ravan Temple, Jodhpur
- Baijanath Temple, Kangra District, Himachal Pradesh
- Ravaleshwara temple- Malavalli, mandya district of Karnataka

== Influence on culture and art ==
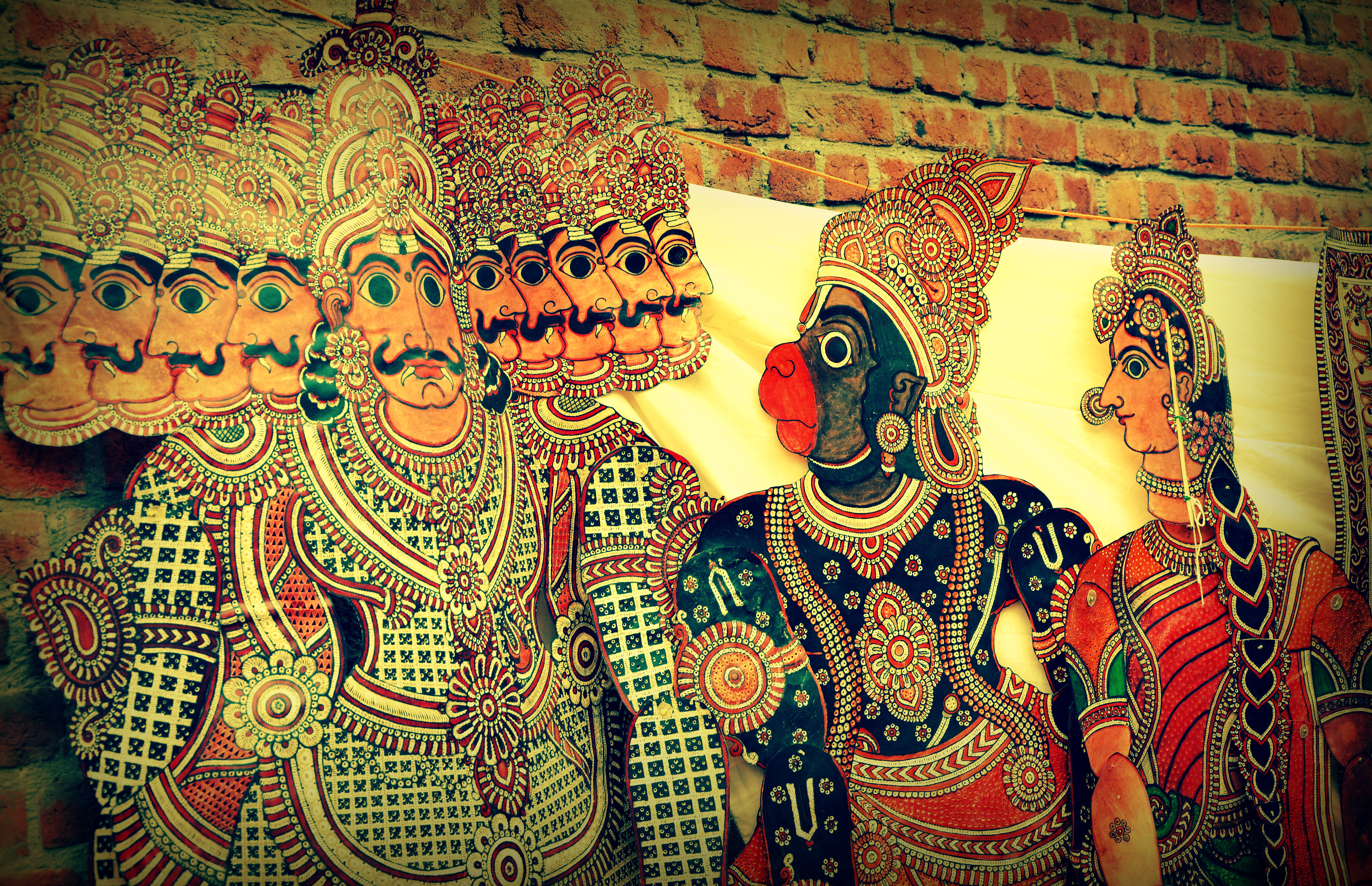
Ravana with Hanuman in tholu bommalata, a shadow puppet tradition of Andhra Pradesh, India

=== Ravana-Dahan (burning effigy of Ravana) ===
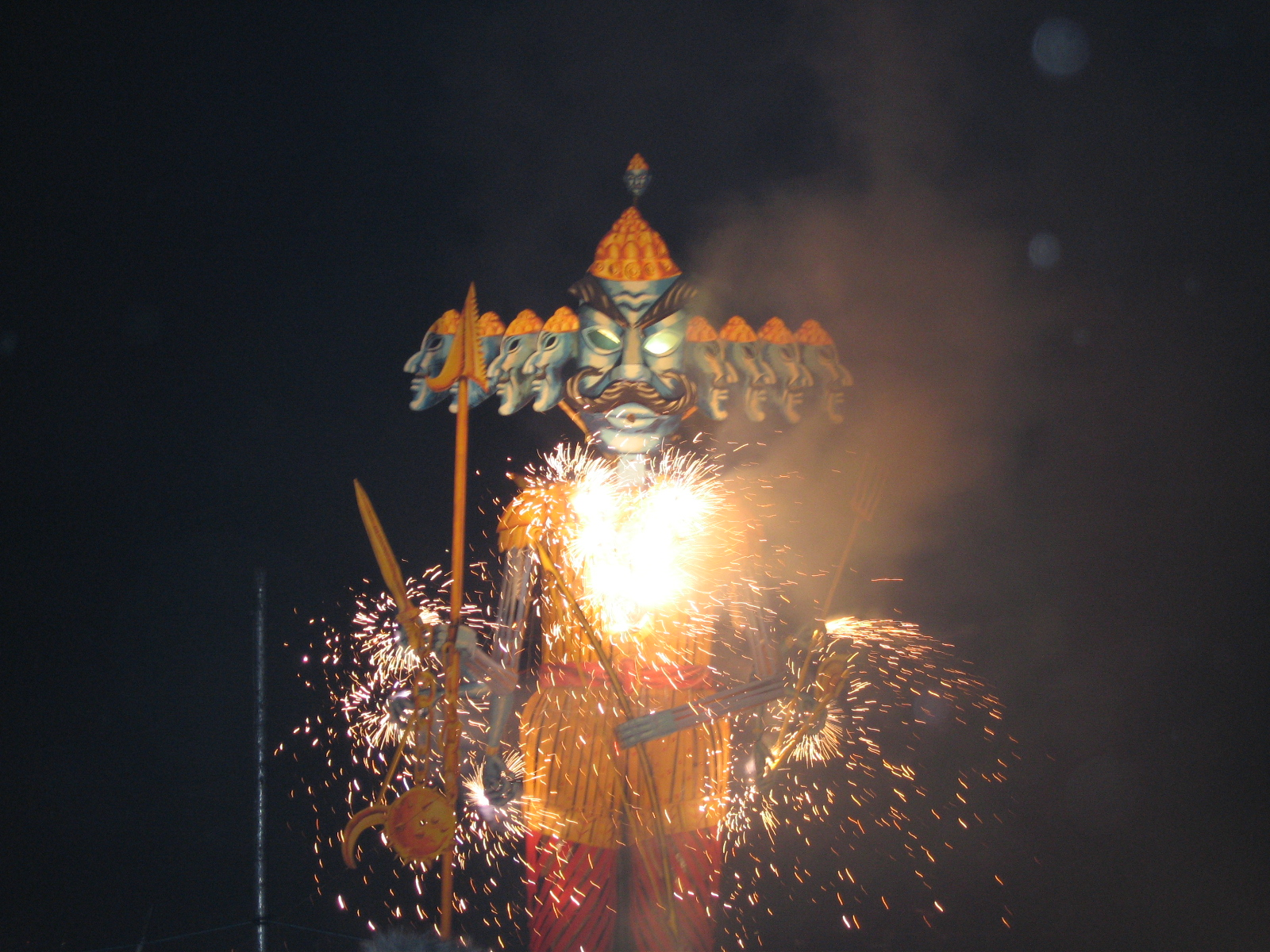
An effigy of Ravana with burning sparklers on Dusshera. Dashehra Diwali Mela in Manchester, England, 2006

Effigies of Ravana are burned on Vijayadashami in many places throughout India to symbolize Rama's triumph over evil.

=== Ravanahatha ===
According to mythology, the ravanahatha, an ancient bowed string instrument, was created by Ravana and is still used as a Rajasthani folk instrument.

=== In Sri Lankan tradition and folklore ===
In Sri Lankan folklore, classical Sinhala chronicles, and local cultural traditions, Ravana is widely regarded as a native monarch of ancient Lanka rather than solely a figure of mainland Indian mythology. According to local oral traditions and Sinhalese literary works such as the Rajavaliya and folk narratives like the Ravanavaliya (Ravana Kathawa), Ravana belonged to the indigenous Yaksha clan through his maternal grandfather, King Sumali, and was born and raised on the island after his father, Sage Vishrava, settled in Lanka and married Princess Kaikesi.

Within Sri Lankan heritage, Ravana is portrayed not merely as an antagonist, but as a scholar, a master of Ayurveda and traditional medicine, a skilled musician credited with inventing the ravanahattha, and an advanced ruler who governed a prosperous civilization. Numerous geographical landmarks across Sri Lanka—including Sigiriya, Ravana Falls (Ravana Ella), Lakegala, and locations within the Seethawaka region—are closely associated with legends of his reign and legacy.

== In other religions ==
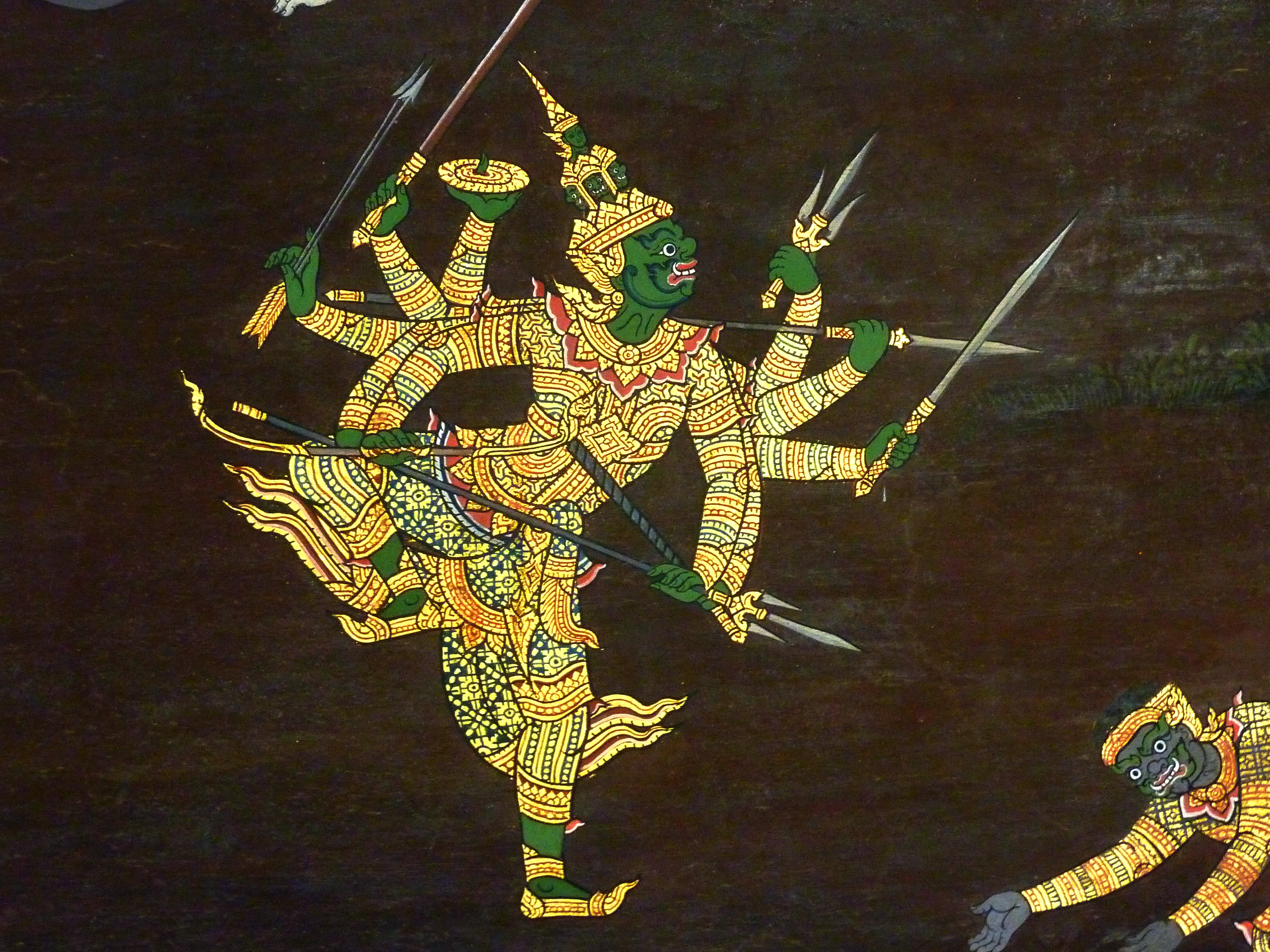
Mural painting depicting Thotsakan (Ravana) at Wat Phra Kaew, Thailand.

In the Rin-spuns-pa Tibetan Ramayana, it is prophesied that Ravana will return as the Buddha incarnation of Vishnu in Kali Yuga.

The Arunachal Pradesh Tai Khamti Ramayana (Phra Chow Lamang) shows Rama as a Bodhisattva who was reborn so Ravana could torture him.

In the Laotian Buddhist text Phra Lak Phra Lam, Rama is a Bodhisattva and the embodiment of virtues, while Ravana is a Brahmin ("mahabrahma") son of Virulaha who is highly materialistic.

In the Cambodian Buddhist text Preah Ream, Buddha is an incarnation of Rama and Ravana is a rakshasa.

In the Thai Buddhist text Ramakien, Ravana is a rakshasa known as "Thotsakan" (ทศกัณฐ์, from Sanskrit दशकण्ठ, Daśakaṇṭha, "ten necks"), and is depicted with green skin.

In the Karandavyuha Sutra, Yama asks if the visitor in hell (Avalokitesvara), whom he hasn't seen yet, is a god or a demon, and whether he is Vishnu, Mahesvara, or the rakshasa Ravana.

=== Jainism ===
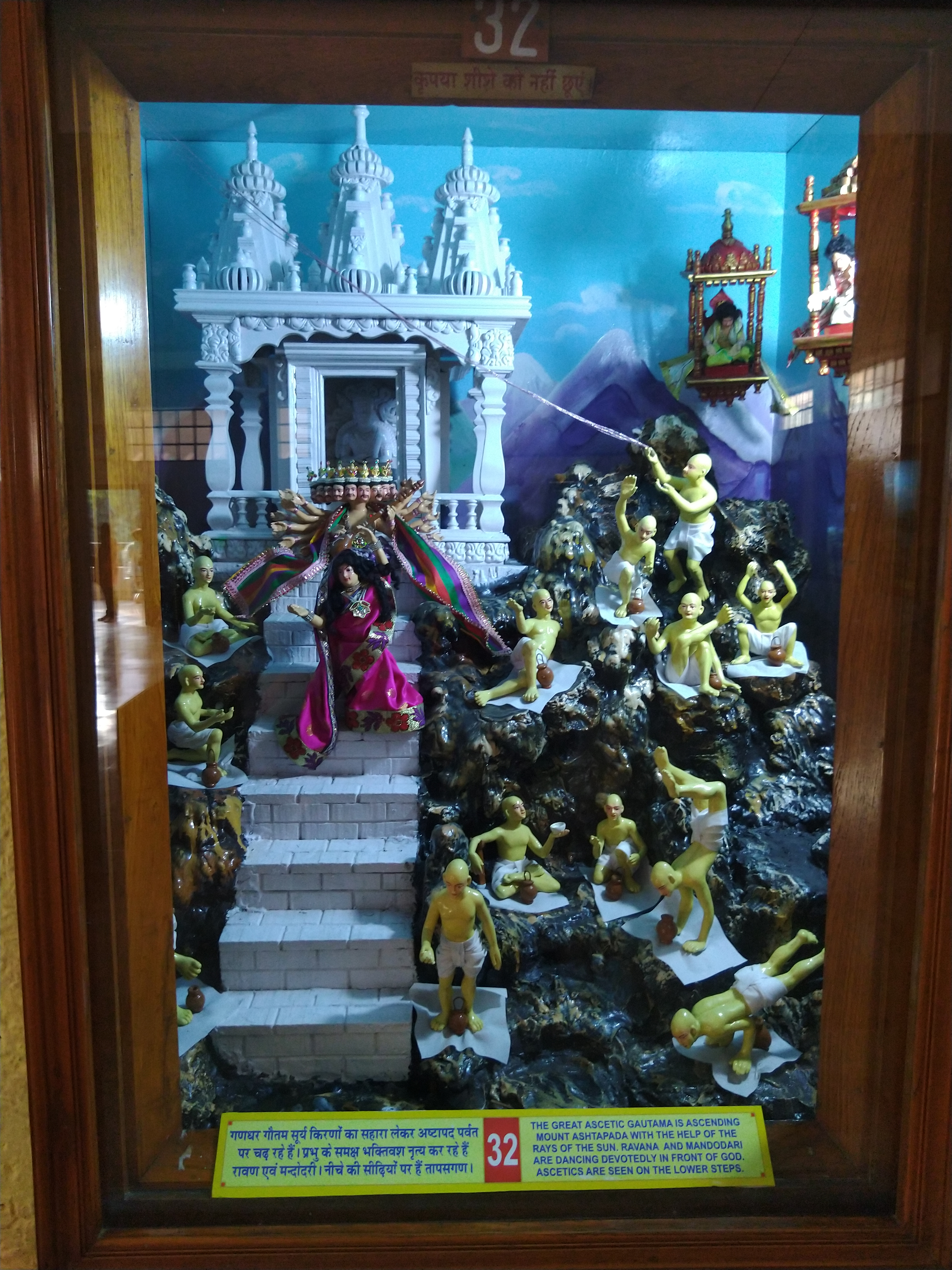
A diorama in Jain Museum of Madhuban depicting Ravana

Jain accounts vary from the traditional Hindu accounts of the Ramayana. The incidents are placed at the time of the 20th Tirthankara, Munisuvrata. In Jainism, both Rama and Ravana were devout Jains. Ravana was a Vidyadhara king who had magical powers, and Lakshmana, not Rama, was the one who ultimately killed Ravana.

=== Dravidian movement ===
Pulavar Kuzhanthai's Ravana Kaaviyam is a panegyric on Ravana that is made up of 3,100 poetic stanzas in which Ravana is the hero. The book was released in 1946, and was subsequently banned by India's Congress led government. The ban was later lifted in 1971.

== In popular culture ==
Sri Lanka named its first satellite Raavana 1 after Ravana.

Ravana appears as the primary antagonist in films and television series based on the Ramayana. Movies like Bhakta Ravana (1938) and its Telugu (1940 and 1958) and Kannada (1958) adaptations as well as television series Raavan (2006-2008) are focused on the tale on Ravana. The Tamil film Raavanan (2010) and its Hindi counterpart Raavan (2010) narrate the epic from Ravana's perspective in a modern setting.

Author Anand Neelakantan published the novel Asura: Tale of the Vanquished in 2012, in which the character Ravana is depicted as a human-like figure.

Author Amish Tripathi's 2019 novel Raavan: Enemy of Aryavarta chronicles the life of Ravana until the time he kidnaps Sita. It is the third book in Tripathi's Ram Chandra Series.

In 2026, Ravana was portrayed by Yash in the film, Ramayana: Part 1.

== See also ==
- Asura – Mythical beings in Indian religions
- Bull Demon King – Character in the novel Journey to the West
- Daitya – Race in Hindu mythology
- Danava (Hinduism) – Race in Hindu mythology
- Keibu Keioiba – Half man, half tiger of Meitei folklore
- Rakshasa – Race in Hindu mythology

== Bibliography ==
- Doniger, Wendy (1993). Purana Perennis: Reciprocity and transformation in Hindu and Jaina texts. SUNY Press. ISBN 9780791413814 – via Google Books.
- Udayakumar, S.P. (2005). Presenting the Past: Anxious history and ancient future in Hindutva India. Greenwood Publishing Group.

Preceded by Kubera	Emperor of Lanka	Succeeded by Vibhisana
