= Malyavan =

Ramayana character

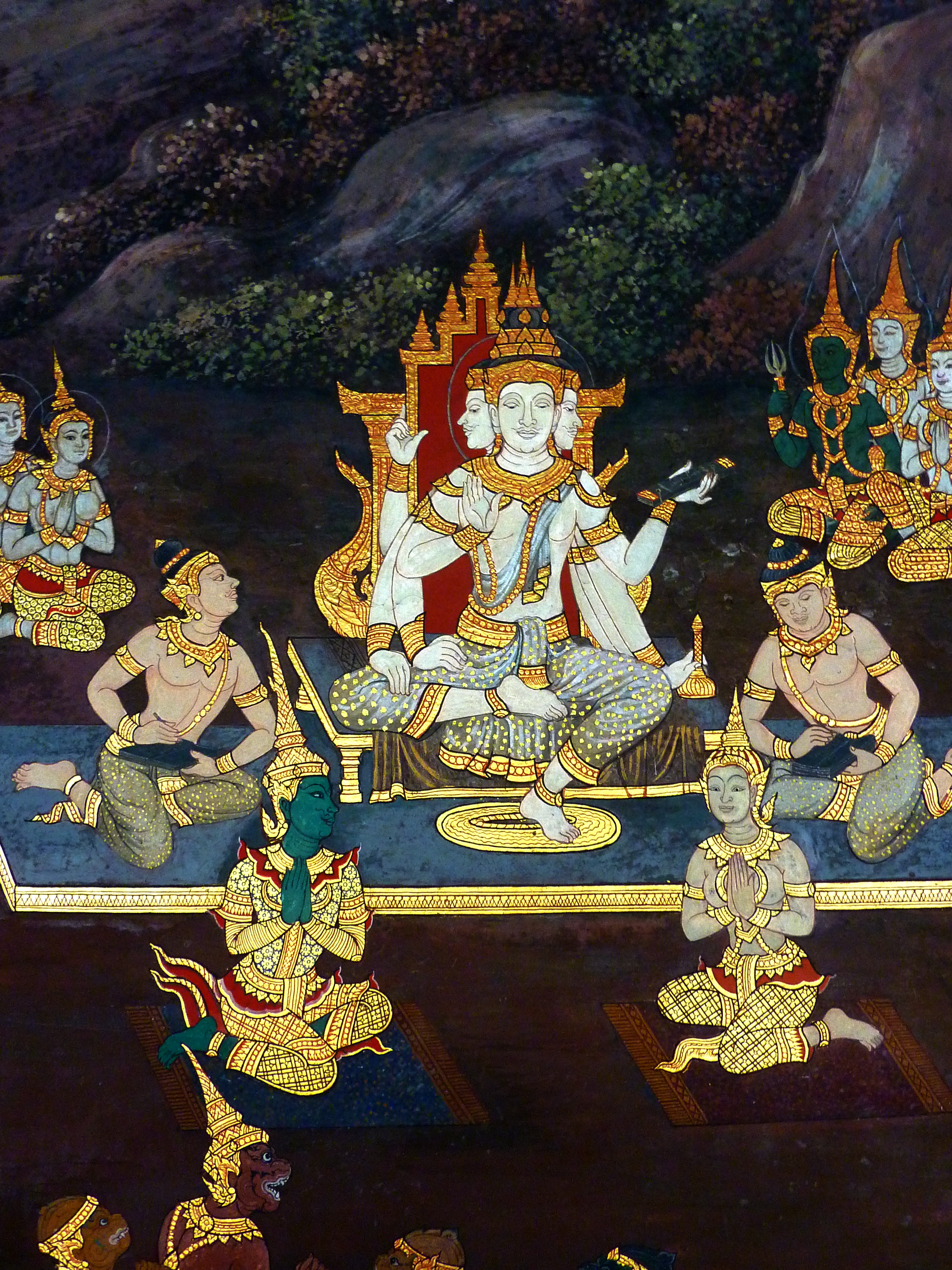
- Thai art of Thao Mali Warat (Malyavan) presiding over in judgment in Ramakien. Wat Phra Kaew, Bangkok.
- Affiliation: Lanka, Rakshasa
- Texts: Ramayana

Genealogy
- Parents: Sukesha (father); Devavati (mother)
- Spouse: Sundari
- Children: Vajramusthi, Virupaksha, Durmukha, Suptaghna, Yajnakopa, Matta, Unmatta (sons); Anala (daughter)

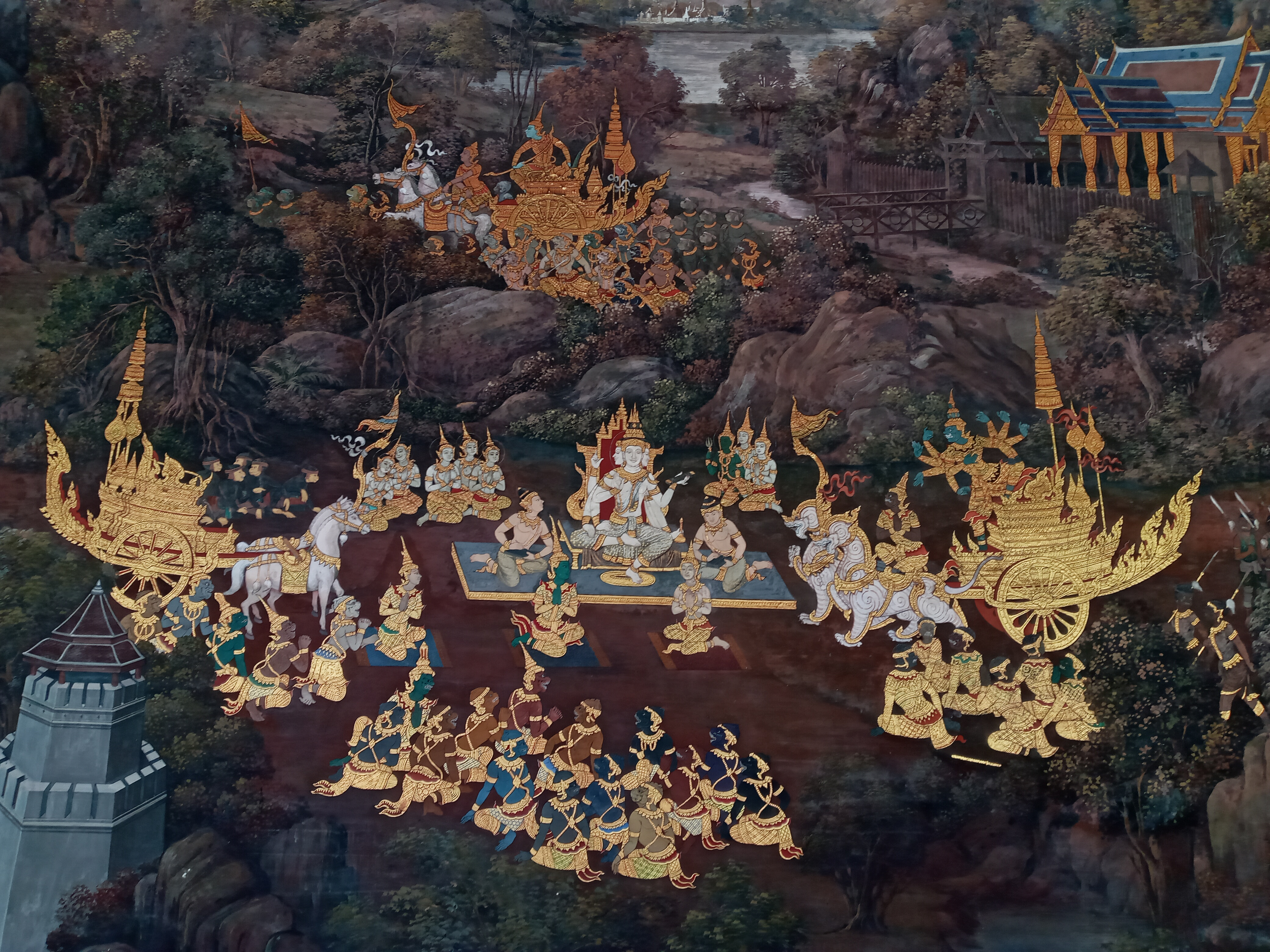
Malyavan's judgement, illustrated in a scene from the Ramakien

Malyavan is a character in Hindu mythology, appearing in the epic Ramayana. A rakshasa, he is the son of Sukesha, and the brother of Mālī and Sumālī. He is described to be a major counsellor to the King of Lanka, Ravana, along with also being the latter's maternal grandfather.

== Ramayana ==
Malyavan is against his grandson's war with Prince Rama, and attempts in vain to convince Ravana to let go to Sita; however, this counsel is rejected by Ravana:

O King, that monarch who is versed in the fourteen sciences, who follows polity, rules an empire over a long period and overcomes his adversaries, who concludes peace or wages war at a fitting time, advances his own party and attains great power. A monarch should ally himself to one stronger than himself or to an equal; he should never underrate a foe and if he is more powerful, should make war on him. On this account I counsel an alliance with Rama and the return of Sita who is the actual cause of the dispute. Devas, Rishis, Gandharvas, all desire him to triumph; do not wage war but resolve to make peace with him!

— Valmiki, Ramayana, Yuddha Kanda, Chapter 35

After the death of Ravana, Malyavan maintains his position and becomes the chief counsellor of Vibhishana, Ravana's younger brother, and Malyavan's third grandson.

Malyavan's wife is Sundari, who is often stated to be beautiful. She bears him seven sons: Vajramusthi, Virupaksha, Durmukha, Suptaghna, Yajnakopa, Matta, and Unmatta, and one daughter, Anala.

== Ramakien ==
Malyavan is known as Thao Mali Warat (ท้าวมาลีวราช) in Ramakien, the version of the Ramayana in Thailand. He is the old brother of Thao Latsadian, the grandfather of Ravana of Lanka, and is considered to have the reputation of Brahma as a paragon of justice. Ravana invites him to judge the case of his abduction of Sita, hoping that he would rule in his favour, but the counsellor investigates all relevant witnesses with fairness, and draws up an order to return Sita to Rama. Ravana does not agree with this ruling and offends him, and therefore he curses that Ravana would die by the bow and arrow of Rama.
