= Chandrahasa (Hinduism) =

Hindu mythological sword

In the Hindu epic Ramayana, the Chandrahasa is an indestructible sword that Shiva gifts Ravana.

== Ravana lifting Mount Kailash ==
The Uttara Kanda of the Hindu epic Ramayana records that the ten-headed, twenty-armed mighty King Ravana defeated and looted Alaka – the city of his step-brother and god of wealth Kubera, situated near Mount Kailash. After the victory, Ravana was returning to Lanka in the Pushpaka Vimana (the flying chariot that his father in law made for him), when he spotted a beautiful place. However, the chariot could not fly over it. Ravana met Shiva's demigod-bull attendant Nandi (Nandisha, Nandikeshwara) at the place and asked the reason behind his chariot's inability to pass over the place. Nandi informed Ravana that Shiva and Parvati were enjoying a dalliance on the mountain, and that no one was allowed to pass. Ravana mocked Nandi. Enraged by the insult, Nandi cursed Ravana that monkeys would destroy him. In turn, Ravana decided to uproot Kailash, infuriated by Nandi's curse and his inability to proceed further. He put all his twenty arms under Kailash and started lifting it. As Kailash began to shake, a terrified Parvati embraced Shiva. However, the omniscient Shiva realized that Ravana was behind the menace, and pressed the mountain into place with his big toe, trapping Ravana beneath it. Ravana gave a loud cry in pain. Realizing his mistake, Ravana sang hymns in praise of Shiva for a thousand years. Finally, Shiva not only forgave Ravana, but also granted him the invincible sword, Chandrahasa.
