= Trishira =

Demon in Hindu mythology

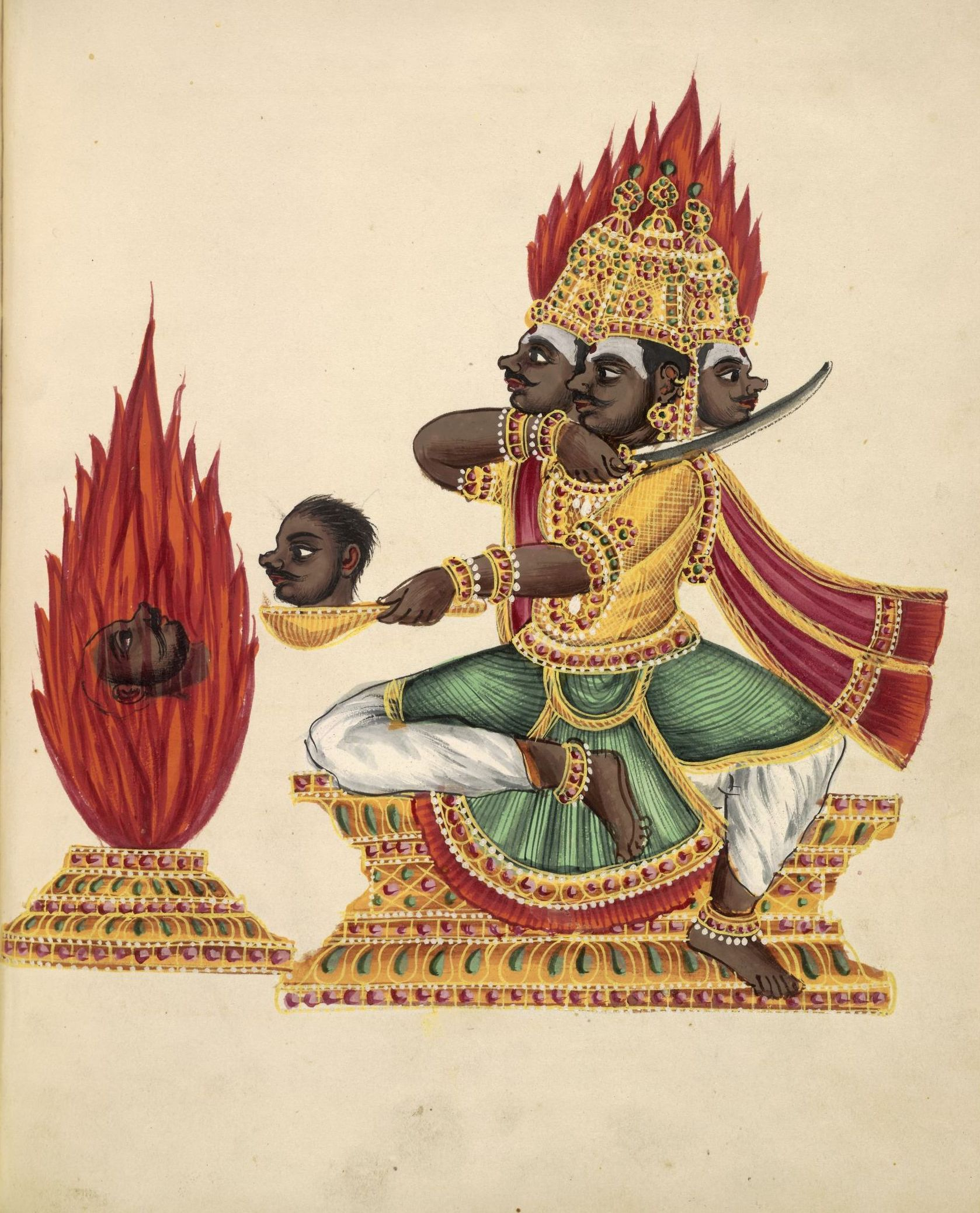
- Trishira sits in lalitasana on a throne facing a fire altar in which a severed head is burning - Trichinopoly style painting

Genealogy
- Parents: Ravana (father); Dhanyamalini (mother)
- Siblings: Atikaya; Narantaka; Devantaka

Trishira (Sanskrit: त्रिशिर, romanized: Triśira, lit. 'the three-headed one') is a rakshasa prince featured in the Ramayana. He is one of the sons of Ravana and Dhanyamalini and his brothers are Atikaya, Narantaka and Devantaka.

== Legend ==
The Ramayana states that Trishira engaged Rama in a fight and hit him with a number of arrows. At this, Rama told him that his arrows were like flowers being showered on his body. Thereafter, a duel ensued, in which Rama killed Trishira.

Trishira and his brother Atikaya are believed to be incarnations of the asuras Madhu and Kaitabha, who were slain by Vishnu during the period of the creation of the universe.

== See also ==
- Ravana
- Ramayana
