= Atikaya =

Character of Indian epic Ramayana

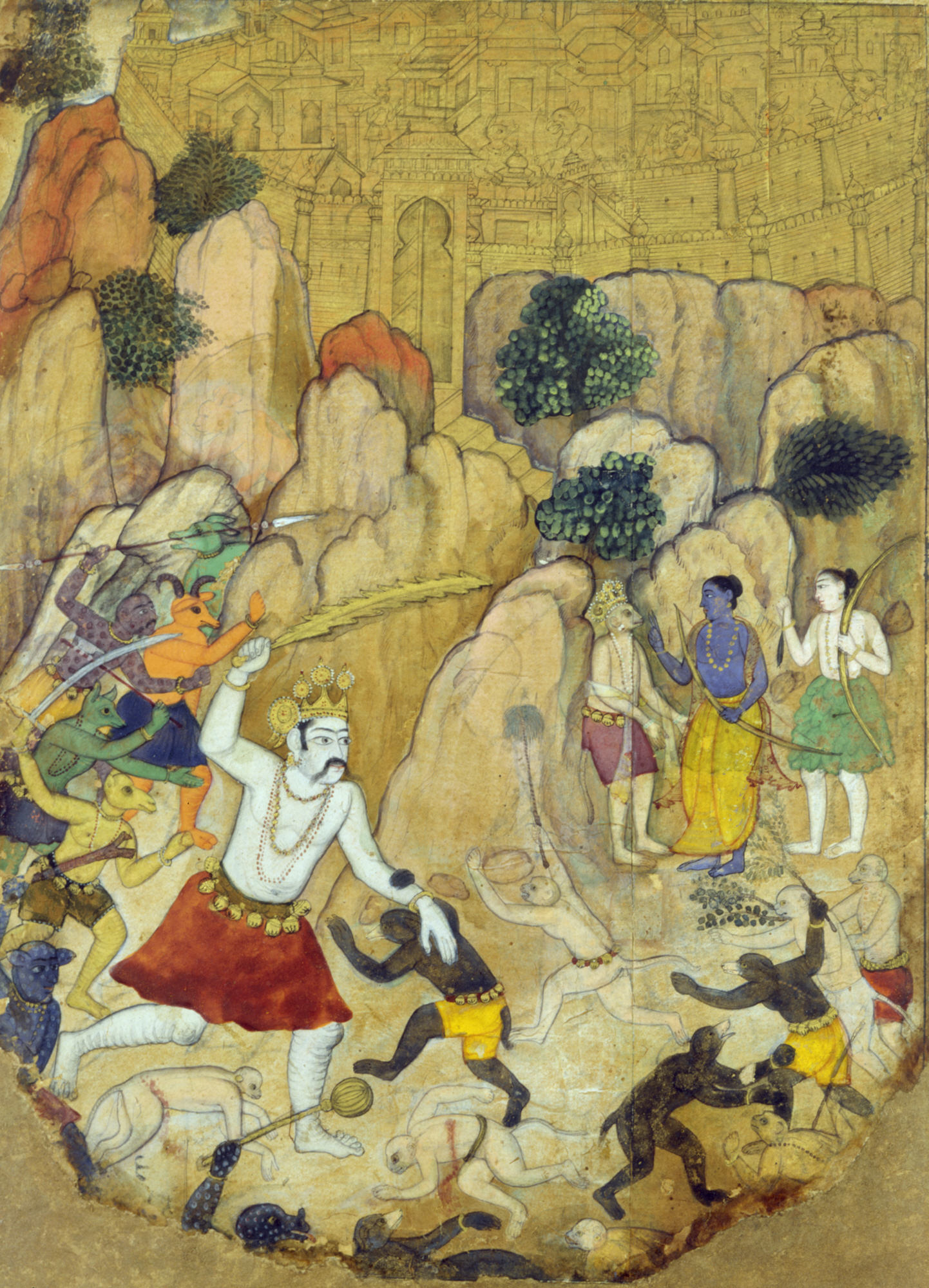
- Atikaya, a son of Ravana
- Texts: Ramayana

Genealogy
- Parents: Ravana (father); Mandodari (mother)
- Siblings: Meghanad; Ahiravana; Akshayakumara

Atikaya (Sanskrit: अतिकाय, romanized: Atikāya) is the son of Ravana and his wife Mandodari in the Hindu epic Ramayana.

== Legend ==
The story of Atikaya is explained by Vibhishana in the Ramayana. Once while filled with rage, he tried to uproot the Chakravalgiri mountain. Shiva noticed this and hurled his trishula at him, but Atikaya was so powerful at that time that he caught the trident mid-air like a toy and started laughing. Shiva was so impressed by the rakshasa that he taught all the secrets of archery to him. Due to armour of Brahma given to him, Atikaya had to be slain by Lakshmana by using a Brahmastra, a powerful weapon of the god Brahma. The wind-god Vayu, at the behest of the god Indra, revealed to Lakshmana the secret that an otherwise invincible armour of Brahma was granted to Atikaya, that could only be pierced by a Brahmastra.

Atikaya and his step brother Trishira are believed to be incarnations of the asuras Madhu and Kaitabha, who were slain by Vishnu during the period of the creation of the universe.
