= Akshayakumara =

Youngest son of Ravana

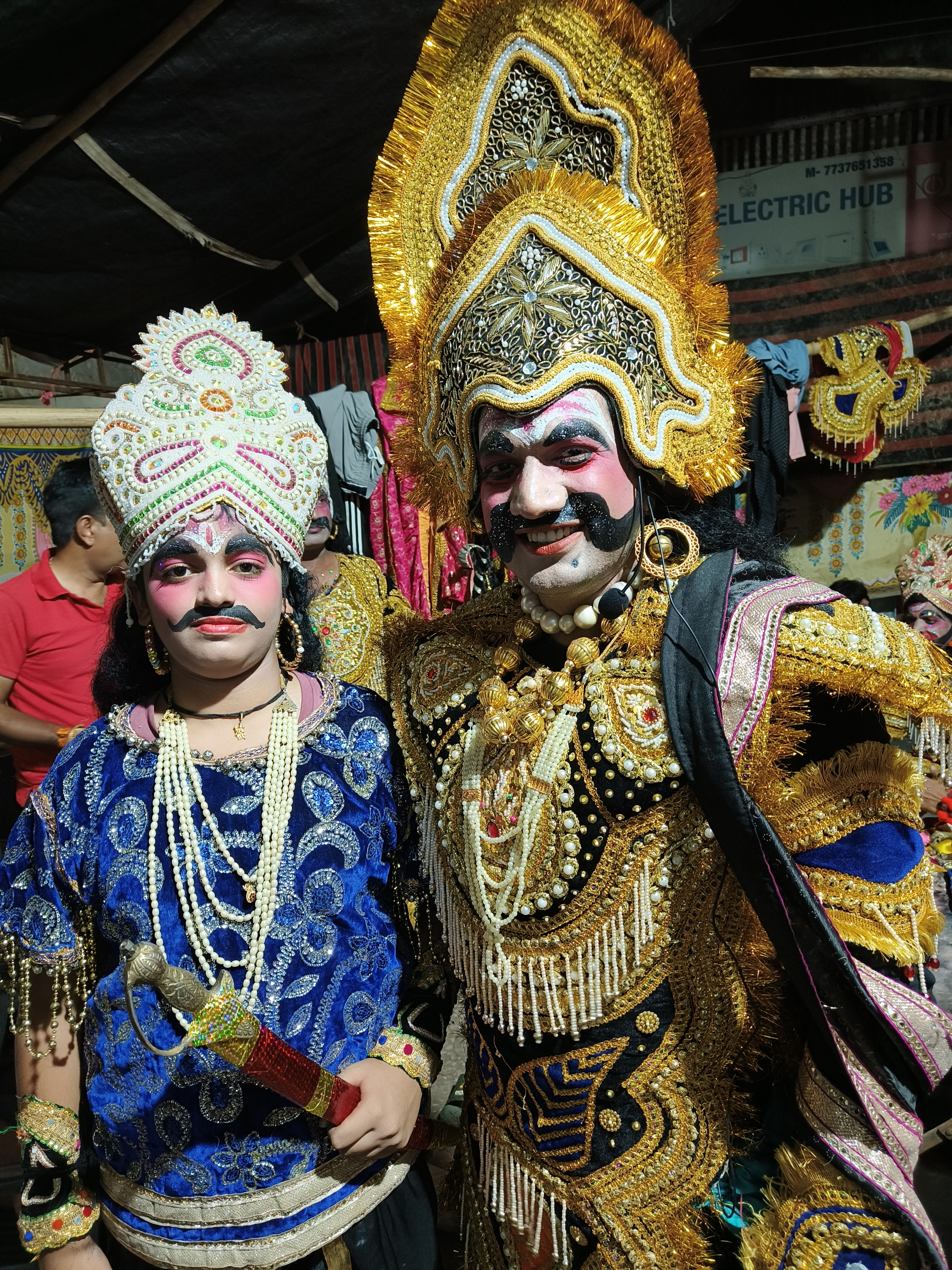
- Ramlila actors as Akshayakumara (left) and Ravana (right)
- Affiliation: Rakshasa
- Texts: Ramayana
- Parents: Ravana (father); Mandodari (mother)

Akṣayakumāra (Sanskrit: अक्षयकुमार) was the youngest son of Ravana and the brother of Meghanada. In the Ramayana, when Hanuman started destroying Ashoka Vatika after a conversation with Sita, Ravana sent him to the head of a Rakshasa army to take care of it. A warrior of just sixteen, he left for battle in his chariot. He fought with Hanuman, aiming various weapons at him. Though highly impressed by the young prince's valor and skills, Hanuman killed and blessed his life.
