= Sandesha Kavya =

Sanskrit genre of messenger poems

The sandesha kavya (Sanskrit: सन्देशकाव्य, romanized: sandeśakāvya) or a duta kavya is a literary form and genre of Sanskrit poetry. Described as a messenger poem, the narrative of a sandesha kavya commonly consists of an exiled lover sending a message to a separated beloved through a messenger, who could be a natural element such as a bird, a cloud, the wind, or a human being. The genre combines the themes of love and separation with descriptions of the landscapes of the natural world. Kalidasa's Meghaduta is regarded to be the most popular example of this literary form.

== Etymology ==
In Sanskrit, sandeśa (संदेश) means "message", and kāvya (काव्य) means "poem" or "poetry".

== Literature ==
- Ghatakarparakavya: The earliest example of a sandesha kavya is the Ghatakarparakavya, a poem by the poet Ghatakarpara, on the message sent to a lover by a love-lorn woman, appealing to a morning cloud to act as her messenger. The poem is of twenty-four stanzas in five different metres.
- Meghaduta: The Meghaduta recounts how a yaksha, a subject of Kubera, the god of wealth, after being exiled for a year to Central India for neglecting his duties, convinces a passing cloud to take a message to his wife at Alaka on Mount Kailasha in the Himalaya mountains. The methodology employed by Kalidasa in the construction of his Meghaduta, a lyric in a little over one hundred verses that personifies objects of nature and describes nature with all its beauties and glories, has been imitated by later Sanskrit poets.
- Pavanaduta: The Pavanadhuta was written by Dhoyin, a 12th century CE court poet of the Gauda king Lakshmana of the Sena dynasty. The poet narrates tells the story of a gandharva maiden called Kuvalayavatī who falls in love with King Lakshmana. She asks the wind (pavana) to take her message of love to the king.
- Mayurasandesha: In Udaya’s Mayurasandesha, the messenger is the peacock.
- Hamsasandesha: The plot of the Hamsasandesha of Vedanta Desika describes Rama sending a swan as a messenger to his wife Sita after she was abducted by Ravana to Lanka.

The Ramayana features Rama sending Hanuman as a messenger to Sita, which has also been speculated to be the earliest example of this genre.

The Mālatīmādhava by Bhavabhuti uses this form in act IX 25-26, in which an abandoned Mādhava searches for a cloud to take his message to Mālatī.

The Cakorasandeśa of Vāsudeva of Payyur features a message sent from a wife to a husband of this genre.

The Unnuneeli Sandesham, one of the oldest literary works in the Malayalam language, was composed as a sandesha kavya.

== Structure ==
Sandesha kavyas are always in two parts; in the first part, the hero is presented, there appears the messenger and the route to the destination is described. The second part includes the destination, the house of the heroine, the heroine and her state of grief in separation, the message describing the hero’s own condition and a word of solace, with an identification mark mentioning some incident the hero and the heroine could know, to assure that the messenger is genuine. The messenger can be anyone – a person, a bird, a bee or a cloud or wind, and that messenger provides very interesting descriptions of cities en route with palaces and temples, pubs and parks, theatres, mansions and streets; the country parts and forests, hills and rivers, animals and birds, trees, creepers and flowers, cultivated fields and peasant girls, artisans. Love in separation is the chief emotion depicted in this type of lyrical poetry and there is certain individuality in the treatment of the theme; this type of poetry is not found in any other literature.

== Metre ==
The metre used is known as mandākrāntā which is slow-moving and consists of pada of four lines each, with each line of seventeen syllables as in Kalidasa's poem Meghaduta Stanza 15:

ratnacchāyāvyatikara iva prekṣyametatpurastād
valmīkāgrāt prabhavati dhanuḥkhaṇḍam ākhaṇḍalasya
yena śyāmaṃ vapur atitarāṃ kāntim āpatsyate te
barheṇeva sphuritarucinā gopaveṣasya viṣṇoḥ

"Like the blending of tints in the jewels, to the Eastward, at the top of the mountain of Valmīkā, will appear a portion of a bow of Akhandala (Indra), by means of which thy dark blue body will gain excessive beauty, like that of the Shepherd clad Vishnu (Lord Krishna) from peacock’s tail, which possesses glittering beauty."

.
