= Sadhvi Prem Baisa =

Indian religious storyteller and sadhvi (2000–2026)

- Baisa in 2026
- Born: Prem Baisa; 2000; Rajasthan, India
- Died: 28 January 2026 (aged 26); Jodhpur, Rajasthan, India
- Occupations: Religious storyteller (kathavachak), sadhvi

Sadhvi Prem Baisa (2000 – 28 January 2026) was an Indian religious storyteller and sadhvi from western Rajasthan. She was known for her Bhagwat Katha programs and bhajan singing in rural areas. Baisa gained national attention in July 2025 due to a viral video scandal involving allegations of misconduct, which she denied as a blackmail attempt. She died under asthma attack Jodhpur in January 2026, with a purported suicide note appearing on her social media hours after her death.

== Early life ==
Prem Baisa was born in 2000 in Pareu, Balotra, Rajasthan, to Viramnath and Amru Baisa.

Her mother Amru Baisa died when Prem was just 5 years old.

From a young age, she showed an inclination toward spirituality and devotion, influenced by her family's religious environment. At age 10, she took sanyas. She was the disciple of her father Veermanath (also known as Veerampuri Maharaj or Virmanath).

== Career ==
Baisa was recognised as a "bal sadhvi" (young ascetic) and conducted storytelling sessions and bhajan singing in districts such as Barmer, Jodhpur, and surrounding areas in western Rajasthan.

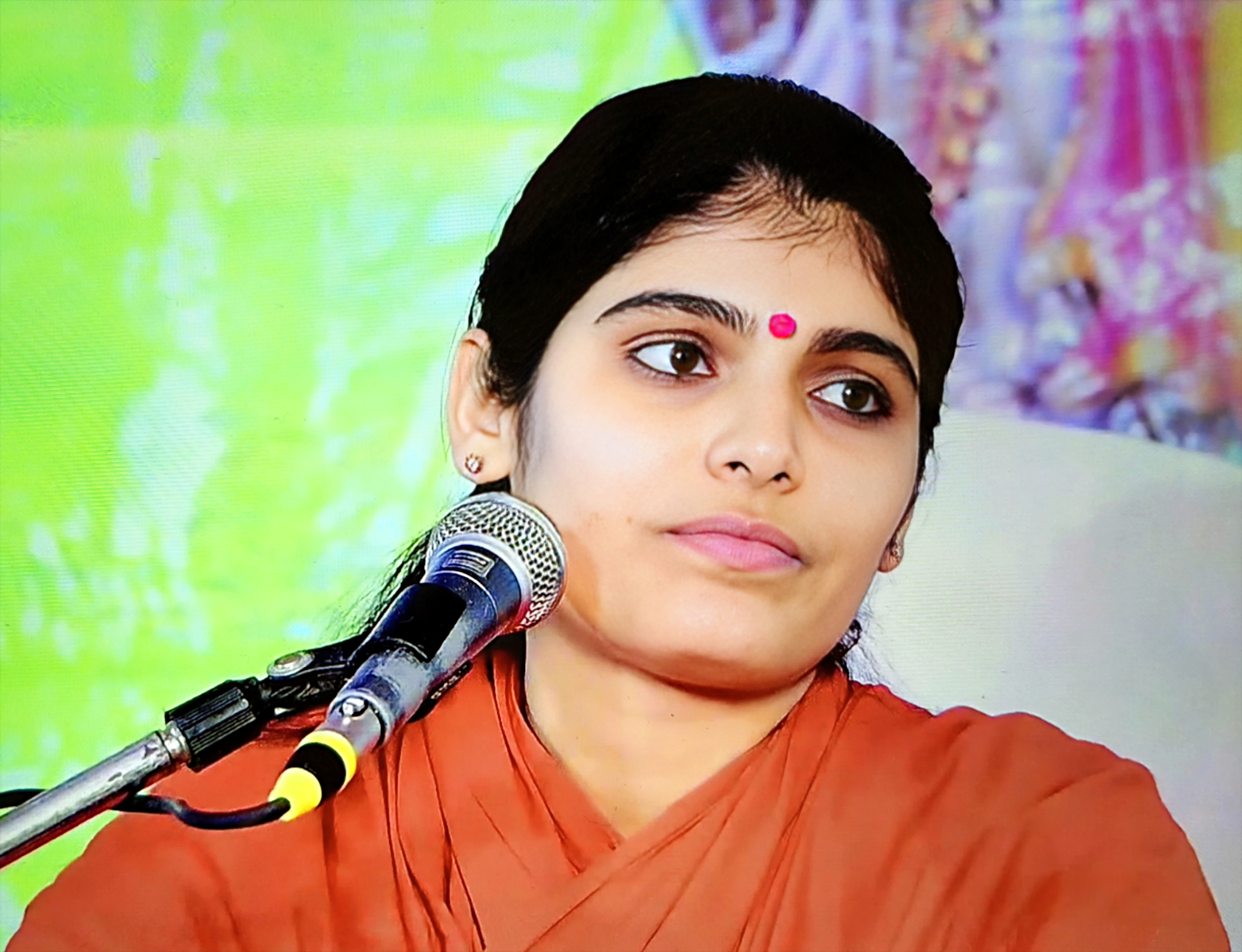
Baisa during a katha

Her programs focused on morality, family values, spirituality, and Hindu teachings, attracting large crowds of devotees. In December 2024, Ramdev attended the inauguration of the Sadhvi Prem Baisa Sadhna Kuti Ashram in Jodhpur.

In November 2025, Baisa joined Dhirendra Shastri in his Sanatan Hindu Ekta Padyatra.

== Viral video controversy ==
In mid-July 2025, a video clip allegedly showing Baisa in an "obscene" or compromising situation with a man went viral on social media. The clip was claimed to depict her "misbehaving" leading to widespread outrage and debates on religious sanctity.

Baisa issued video statements denying the allegations, claiming the clip was doctored for blackmail purposes. She explained that the original footage was from 2021, showing her hugging her father (Veermanath) during a period of depression, and had been manipulated by removing other people present.

She alleged that blackmailers, including former ashram staff, demanded ₹20 lakh to suppress it. When she refused, they released the edited video to defame her and "Sanatan Sanskriti" (Hindu culture). Baisa vowed to undergo Agni Pariksha (a symbolic trial by fire from Hindu mythology) to prove her innocence.

She had filed an FIR with Jodhpur's Boranada police in 2022, leading to the arrest of suspects, including a former staff member, on 20 July 2025. The accused were later released on bail. The scandal resulted in the cancellation of her Bhagwat Katha programs and significant professional repercussions.

== Death ==
On 28 January 2026, Baisa was found in a critical condition at her ashram in Jodhpur and was rushed to Preksha Hospital, where she was declared dead on arrival. Police initially treated the case as a suspicious death, with reports indicating she had suffered from a fever and collapsed after receiving an injection at the ashram.

Approximately four hours after her death, a purported suicide note appeared on her Instagram account, linking her emotional distress to the 2025 blackmail and defamation case.

The note referenced her previous requests for "Agni Pariksha" and stated, "I wrote letters to many saintly figures, requesting permission for the trial by fire, but what nature destined was not to be. I bid farewell to the world forever. Justice will be served either in my lifetime or after my death."

Based on the final medical and forensic reports released on 14 February 2026, the cause of Sadhvi Prem Baisa’s death was respiratory failure caused by a severe asthma attack.
