= Manikandapuram =

- Village
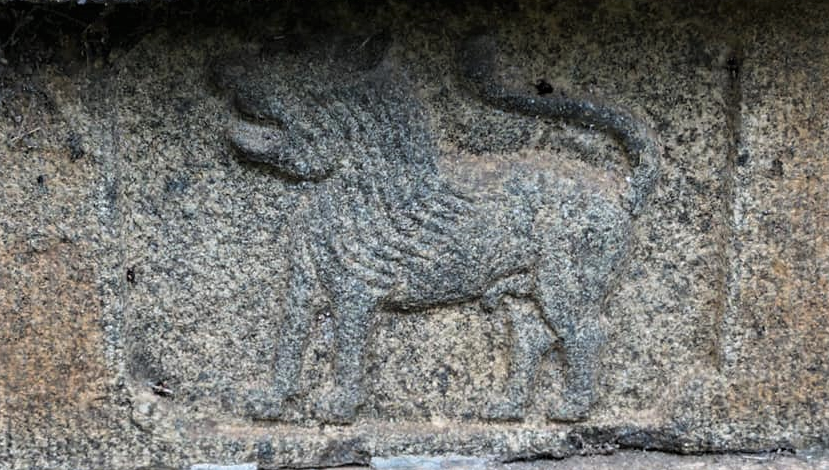
- Royal seal of Thekkumkur Dynasty engraved in stone (Punchaman Illom)
- Interactive map of Manikandapuram
- Coordinates: 9.518057°N 76.5784076°E
- Country: India
- State: Kerala
- District: Kottayam

Government
  - Type: Village
  - Body: Vakathanam Grama Panchayath
- Time zone: UTC+5:30 (IST)
- PIN: 686538
- Telephone code: 0481
- Vehicle registration: KL-33

Manikandapuram was the capital of the Kingdom of Thekkumkur (now part of India). Manikandapuram is a part of Vakathanam Gramam in the Changanassery Taluk of Kottayam District. At the beginning of the Thekkumkur princely state, the nearest place, Vennimala was established as the headquarters.

== Manikandapuram Temple ==
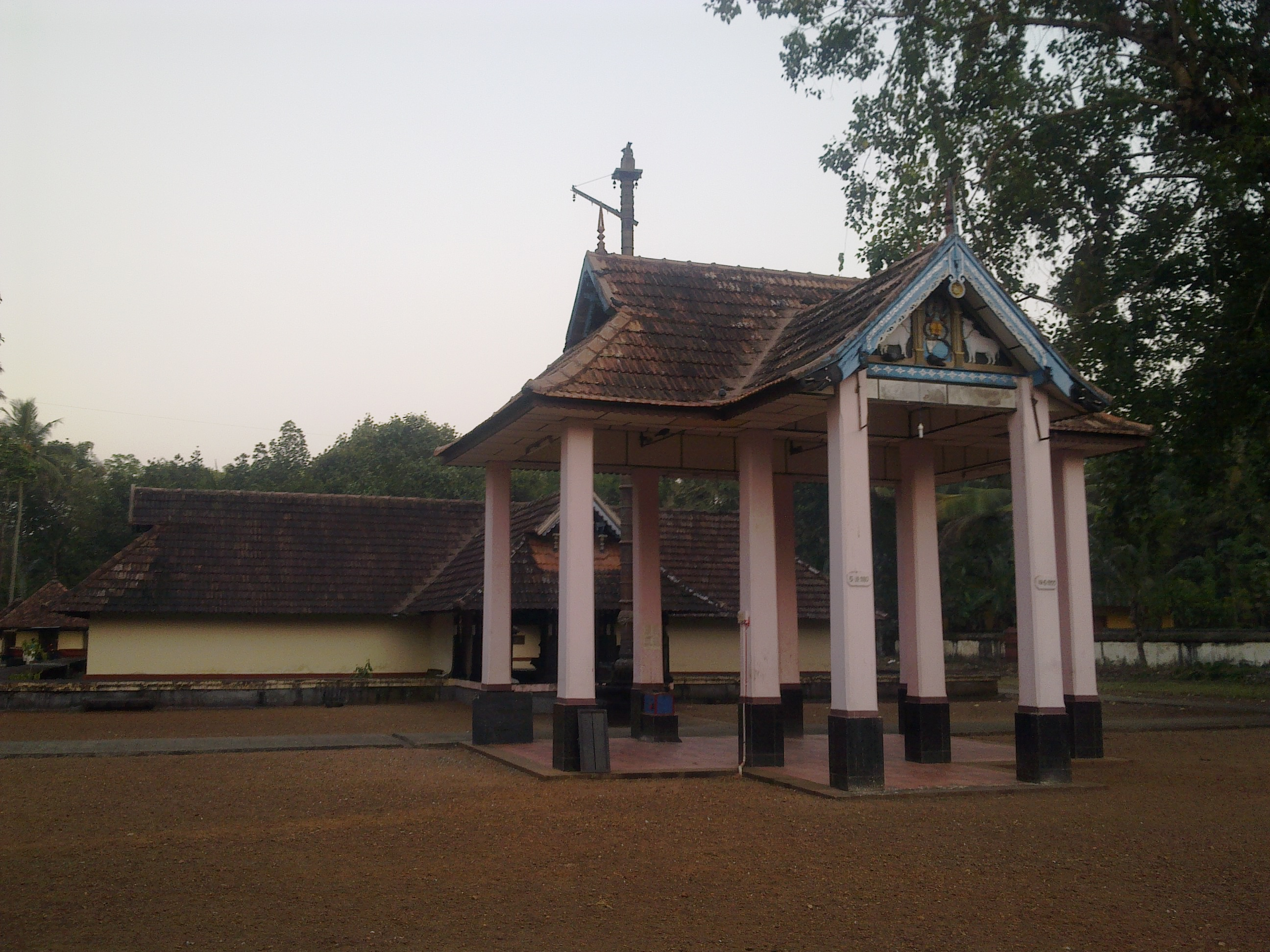
Manikandapuram temple

The Manikandapuram Sreekrishna Temple was built in the 12th century by Thekkumkur king Eravi Manikanda Varman (reign: 1150 - 1180 C.E). The construction of the temple and the installation of the idol of Lord Krishna took place on the 25th day of Malayalam month Medam (Meṣa) in Kollam Era 325 (1150 C.E). The king would take part in the annual festival of Vennimala Sree Rama Lakshmana Swamy Temple. During the royal hunting (Pallivetta) in the temple, the king Eravi Manikandan shot an animal he saw, but it was a cow. The Manikandapuram Temple was built by King Manikandan for his atonement, knowing that he killed a cow.

There is evidence that the fort and the tunnels were at Manikandapuram, as were the later headquarters of the Thekkumkur monarchy at Changanassery and Thaliyanthanapuram (Kottayam). The temple was very popular in the Thekkumkur dynasty. References to this temple are found in Aithihyamala of Kottarathil Sankunni and Unnuneeli Sandesam, the classics of Malayalam Literature.

== Unnuneeli Sandesam ==
The Malayalam poem Unnuneeli Sandesam describes the ancient Manikandapuram and Sreekrishna temple. In this poem, the temple and the underground passages connecting Venimala and Manikandapuram are explicit. There is depression in Manikandapuram, which looks like the entrance to a tunnel. The temple has huge acres of paddy fields in revenue records to feed hundreds of people every day.
