= Sanjivani (Hinduism) =

Medicinal herb in Hinduism

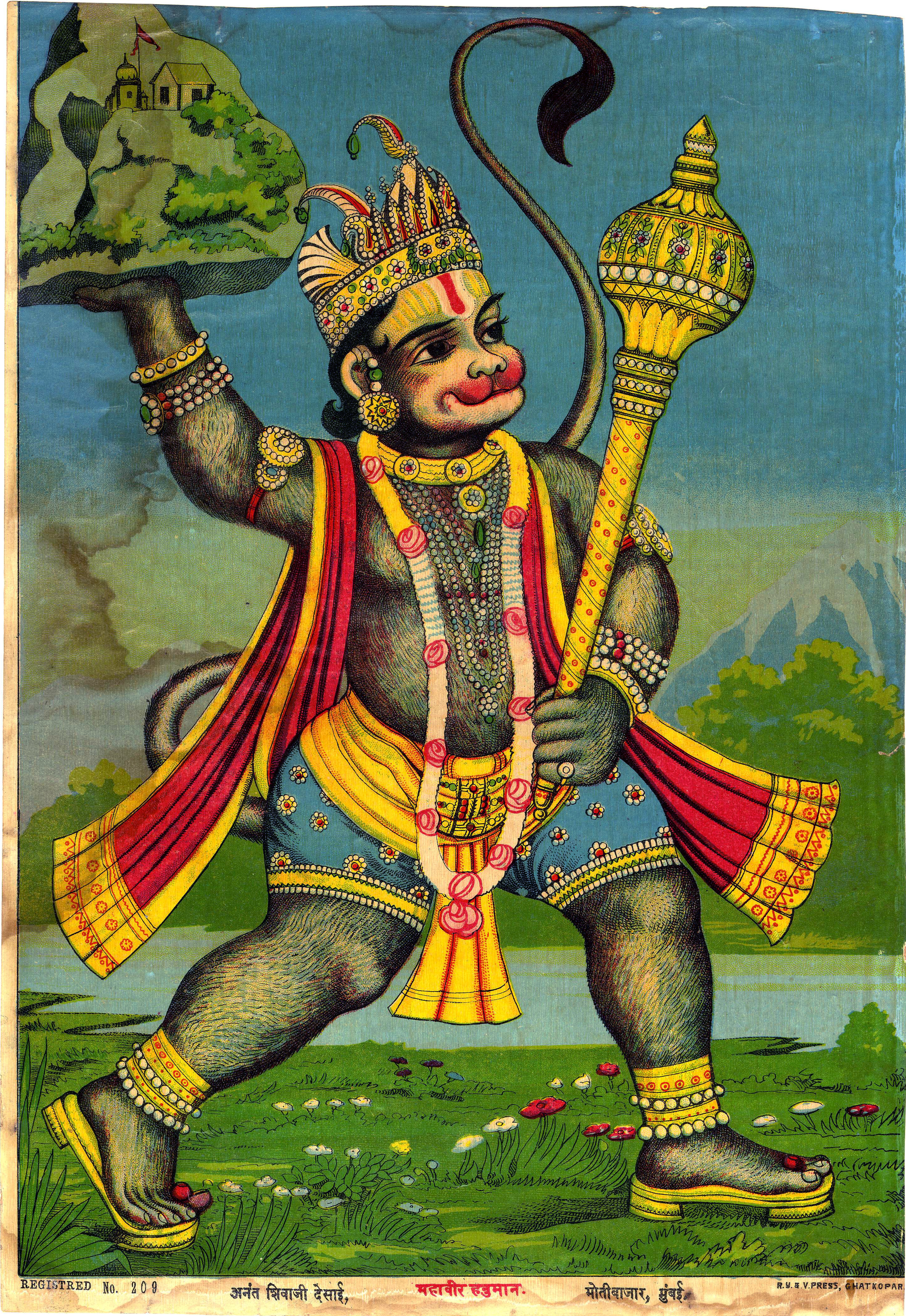
Hanuman retrieves the sanjivani by taking the entire mountain

Sanjivani (Sanskrit: संजीवनी, romanized: Sanjīvanī, lit. 'that which gives life') or the Mrtasanjivani (Sanskrit: मृतसञ्जीवनी, romanized: Mṛtasañjīvanī) is a mythical herb featured in the Hindu epic Ramayana.

== Literature ==
The herb is mentioned in the Ramayana when Ravana's son, Indrajit, hurls a powerful weapon at Lakshmana. Lakshmana is badly wounded, and is killed by this attack. In the Kamba Ramayanam, Sushen Vaidh instructs Hanuman to fetch the sanjeevani herb by flying to the northern side of Mount Meru, where he would find the Nīla-mahāgiri, the great blue mountain, beyond which he would find the Ṛṣabhādri, the ox-shaped mountain, with two peaks. This mountain is described to bear four medicinal herbs, including sanjeevani. Unable to identify the herb, and due to time being of the essence, Hanuman lifts the entire mountain and carries it to the dead Lakshmana, who is healed and revived after its application.

The mountain that bears the sanjeevani is also called the Oshadhiparvata.

== Identification ==
The mountain of herbs is identified as the Valley of Flowers near Badri in Uttarakhand on the slopes of the Himalayas.

Several plants have been proposed as possible candidates for the sanjeevani plant, including: Selaginella bryopteris, Dendrobium plicatile (synonym Desmotrichum fimbriatum), Cressa cretica, and others. A search of ancient texts at CSIR laboratories did not reveal any plant that can be definitively confirmed as sanjeevani. In certain texts it is written that sanjeevani glows in the dark.

The herb, believed in Ayurvedic medicine to have medicinal properties, has been searched for unsuccessfully for centuries, up to modern times. The Himalayan state of Uttarakhand in northern India committed an initial 250m rupees (£2.8m) of state money to search for sanjeevani Booti starting in August 2016. The search was focused on the Dronagiri range of the Himalayas near the Chinese border. The Ramayana mentions a mountain believed to refer to the Dronagiri range, where the magical herb is supposed to grow. Uttarakhand established a Department of AYUSH in November 2014.
