= Katta Varadaraju =

16th century Indian poet

Sahiti Bhoja Katta Varadaraju
- Born: Cuddapah, Vijayanagara Empire. (modern day Andhra Pradesh, India).
- Occupation: Poet
- Parent: Haridasaraju (father) Krishnamba (mother)
- Writing career
- Language: Telugu
- Period: Prabandha Period
- Notable works: Sri Ramayanamu; Sriranga Mahatmyam; Parama Bhagavata Charitra

Katta Varadaraju (17th century CE) was a Telugu poet.

== Biography ==
Katta Varadaraju was born to Haridasaraju and Krishnamba at Cuddapah in the Vijayanagara Empire. His grandfather was Rangappa Raju, an ally of the Vijayanagara Emperor Rama Deva Raya. He is a Kshatriya of the solar race and a descendant of the legendary Chola king Karikala Chola.

== Notable works ==
- Sri Ramayanamu
- Sriranga Mahatmyam
- Parama Bhagavata Charitra
