= Unnuneeli Sandesam =

Malayalam poem

Unnuneeli Sandesam is among the oldest works in Malayalam language. It is a sandesa kavyam (message poem), a message written in poetry, on the lines of the famous Meghadūta of Kalidasa. In the case of this work, it is a message written by a lover to his lady-love staying at a far-off place. The message is therefore written as if it is sent through a messenger. The work was written in the 14th century AD, when transport and communications were very limited in Kerala. The messenger in the poem is, therefore, a carrier pigeon. Apart from the message proper, the poem gives detailed instructions to the messenger pigeon, including the route to be taken and the landmarks in route.

Besides the literary value of the work, it throws light on the geography of Kerala of that period. It, therefore, reads in part like a travelogue too. The journey starts in Thiruvananthapuram, the capital of the Venad (Travancore) Kingdom of that day, and ends at Kaduthuruthy, a pod bodies mentioned in the poem are not to be seen now.

The exact identity of the author remains a mystery, but it is widely believed that one of the members of the Vadakkumkur royal family wrote it. An annotated version was published by DC Books.
