= Maya Sita =

Illusionary duplicate of the Hindu goddess Sita

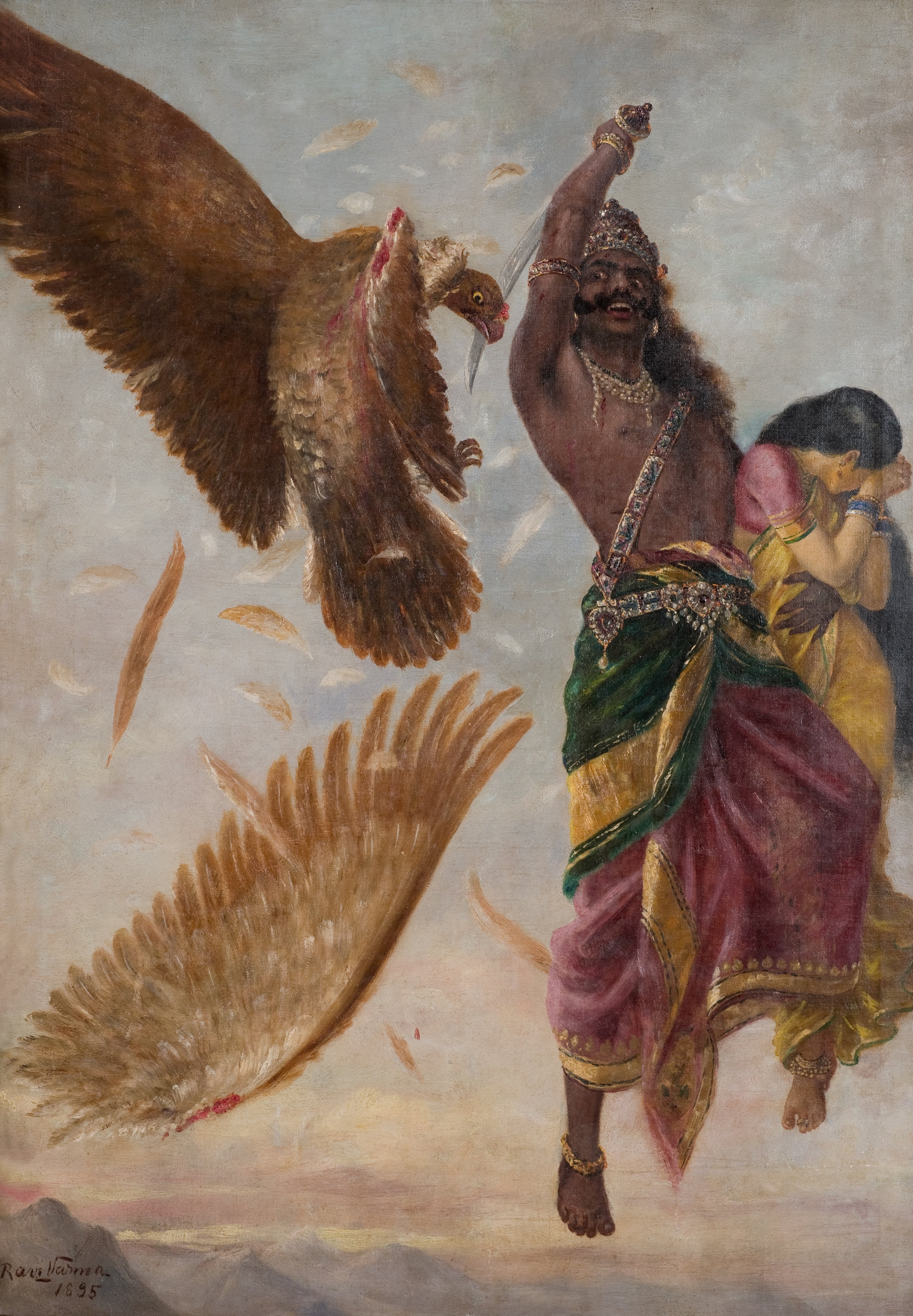
A painting of Ravana kidnapping Sita by Raja Ravi Varma. Some versions of the Ramayana narrate that Maya Sita was kidnapped by Ravana instead of the real Sita.

In some adaptations of the Hindu epic Ramayana, Māyā Sīta (Sanskrit: माया सीता, "illusional Sita") or Chāyā Sīta (छाया सीता, "shadow Sita") is the illusionary duplicate of the goddess Sita (the heroine in the texts), who is abducted by the demon-king Ravana of Lanka instead of the real Sita.

In the Ramayana, Sita – the consort of Rama (the prince of Ayodhya and an avatar of the god Vishnu) – is seized by Ravana and imprisoned in Lanka, until she is rescued by Rama, who slays her captor. Sita undergoes Agni Pariksha (an ordeal of fire) by which she proves her chastity before she is accepted by Rama. In some versions of the epic, the fire-god Agni creates Maya Sita, who takes Sita's place and is abducted by Ravana and suffers his captivity, while the real Sita hides in the fire. At Agni Pariksha, Maya Sita and the real Sita exchange places again. While some texts mention that Maya Sita is destroyed in the flames of Agni Pariksha, others narrate how she is blessed and reborn as the epic heroine Draupadi or the goddess Padmavati. Some scriptures also mention her previous birth being Vedavati, a woman Ravana tries to molest.

The Maya Sita motif saves Sita – the chief goddess of Rama-centric sects – from falling prey to Ravana's plot of abduction and safeguards her purity. Similar doubles or surrogates of Sita and other goddesses are found in various tales of Hindu mythology.

== Original plot of the Ramayana ==
The Ramayana (5th to 4th century BCE) by Vālmiki does not mention Maya Sita. Sita, the princess of Mithila, is married to Rāma, the prince of Ayodhya. Rama is forced to go on a 14-year exile and is accompanied by Sita and his brother Lakshmana. Ravana, the demon-king of Lanka, plots to abduct Sita, aided by Maricha, who transforms into a magical golden deer (Maya mriga, an illusional deer), that entices Sita. While in exile in Dandakaranya forest, Rama goes after the deer and slays it. The magical deer gives a call of help in Rama's voice. Sita forces Lakshmana to go and help Rama, leaving her alone. Ravana comes disguised as an ascetic and kidnaps her. He imprisons her in the Ashoka Vatika grove of Lanka, until she is rescued by Rama, who slays Ravana in war. When Rama doubts Sita's chastity, she undergoes a trial by fire (Agni Pariksha). Sita enters a burning pyre declaring that if she has been faithful to Rama let the fire not harm her; she comes out unscathed with the fire-god Agni as proof of her purity. Rama accepts Sita back and returns to Ayodhya, where they are crowned as king and queen.

== Development ==
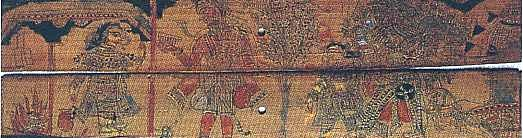
Folio of the Oriya Vaidehisa Vilasa. Left half: Sita hides in the fire as Maya Sita receives Ravana, disguised as an ascetic. Right half: Maya Sita is abducted by Ravana.

The Maya Sita motif is considered as the "most important instance of an addition" in the Ramayana. The Kurma Purana (c. 550–850 CE) is the first text where Maya Sita appears. The key event of the Ramayana story – the kidnapping of Sita by Ravana – was replaced with the abduction of Maya Sita (an unreal Sita) by Ravana; meanwhile Sita is protected in the refuge of Agni, the fire god. This "important ideological development" in Vaishnavism (Vishnu-centric sect) protected Sita's chastity. Some versions of the Ramayana such as the ones in the Mahabharata (5th to 4th century BCE), the Vishnu Purana (1st century BCE–4th century CE), the Harivamsa (1–300 CE) and several Puranas (the suffix Purana denotes that the text is part of this genre) omit the Agni Pariksha altogether to avoid questioning Sita's purity. In contrast, this very Agni Pariksha became a device for the return of the unblemished Sita, as Sita and Maya Sita switch places again, in some later versions. With the growing popularity of Rama bhakti movement in the 12th century, numerous works adopted the concept of Maya Sita. Devotees could not bear that Sita – the consort of Rama and the chief goddess of Rama-centric sects – was kidnapped by the demon Ravana and had to suffer his imprisonment and was defiled by his touch. The Maya Sita concept saves Sita from suffering Ravana's custody and succumbing to the temptation of acquiring the illusory deer. Instead, the texts create an illusory Sita, who does not recognize the illusory deer. The illusory deer motif in the Ramayana may have inspired the Maya Sita concept too. Maya Sita also excuses Sita from rebuking Lakshmana when she forces him to leave her and aid Rama in the illusory deer tale.

Though the Maya Sita motif was found earlier in the Kurma Purana and the Brahma Vaivarta Purana (801–1100 CE) where Sita's purity is safeguarded, it is the Adhyatma Ramayana (a part of the Brahmanda Purana, c. 14th century), where Maya Sita plays a much greater role in the plot. The concept of maya (illusion) is an integral part of the narrative; the best examples being Maya Sita and Maya mriga (illusory deer). Though Adhyatma Ramayana originated in Varanasi in North India, it influenced Malayalam (South India) and Oriya (East India) renditions of the Ramayana, but most importantly influenced the Ramcharitmanas of Tulsidas (c. 1532–1623).

The Ramcharitmanas expands on the Agni Pariksha narrative. Since no one knows about the replacement of the real Sita by Maya Sita, Sita's chastity is in question. The text explicitly states that the Agni Pariksha destroys the Maya Sita as well as the "stigma of public shame", that Sita would have had to otherwise endure. Rama is exculpated from using harsh words to "Sita" at the time of Agni Pariksha as he knows it is the false Sita he is accusing. Sita is saved from public humiliation as her chastity is proven by Agni Pariksha. The moral status of Rama as well as Sita is protected by the Maya Sita motif.

In many versions of the tale, the omniscient Rama knows about Sita's impending abduction and creates Maya Sita. Such versions assert Rama's divine status, a departure from Valmiki's portrayal of Rama as a human hero.

The motif also appears in the Devi Bhagavata Purana (6th–14th century CE) and the Adbhuta Ramayana, (c. 14th century CE) as well as Oriya works like Balarama Dasa's Jagamohana Ramayana, Upendra's Vaidehisha Vilasa and the Oriya Ramlila, dramatic folk re-enactment of the Ramayana.

== Legend ==
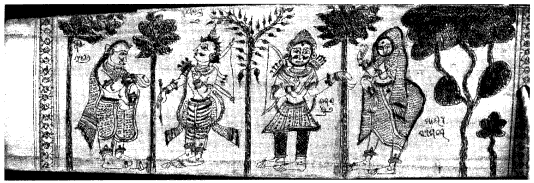
Creation of Maya Sita, Adhyatma Ramayana folio.

In the Kurma Purana, Sita prays to Agni just when Ravana arrives to kidnap her. Agni creates Maya Sita – an exact double of Sita – who takes the place of Sita and is abducted by the demon. While Sita is taken by Agni to heaven, Maya Sita is confined in Lanka. After Ravana's death, when Maya Sita enters the fire at Agni Pariksha, Agni restores the real undefiled Sita to Rama; meanwhile Maya Sita is destroyed in the blaze. The Chaitanya Charitamrita, a biography of the Vaishnava saint Chaitanya Mahaprabhu (1486–1533), by Krishnadasa Kaviraja (b. 1496) alludes to the Kurma Purana tale. Chaitanya meets a brahmin Rama devotee in Madurai. The brahmin is devastated after learning that "mother Sita, mother of the universe and the supreme goddess of fortune" was stained by Ravana's touch and gives up food. The saint consoles the brahmin saying that Sita's spiritual form can not be touched by the demon; it was Maya Sita that was taken away by Ravana. The brahmin feels better and accepts food. Chaitanya then travels to Rameswaram, where he listens to the Kurma Purana and obtains the authoritative proof to comfort the brahmin. He returns to Madurai with the Kurma Purana manuscript, leaving that brahmin overjoyed.

While Agni is the saviour in the Kurma Purana, the Rama-centric Adhyatma Ramayana replaces Agni with the omniscient Rama as the mastermind. Rama knows of Ravana's intentions and orders Sita to place her chaya (shadow) outside the hut for Ravana to abduct and go inside the hut and live hidden in the fire for a year; after Ravana's death, she would unite with him again. Sita complies and creates her illusionary form, Maya Sita, and enters the fire. After Maya Sita's seizure, Rama grieves for Sita. It is unclear if Rama pretends to grieve or forgets that Maya Sita is the one actually kidnapped. After Ravana's death, Maya Sita has to face the Agni Pariksha and vanishes in the fire. Agni reinstates Sita and declares that Rama created the illusionary Sita to bring about Ravana's annihilation and with that purpose served, the true Sita returns to Rama. Inspired by Adhyatma Ramayana, the Ramacharitmanas has a very similar narrative; however, Agni Pariskha narrative is longer and Maya Sita is explicitly stated to be destroyed in the fire. The Nepali Bhanubhakta Ramayana by Bhanubhakta Acharya (1814–1868) portrays Rama creating the illusionary Sita from the sacred Kusha grass and entrusting Sita to Agni; at Agni Pariksha, the grass Maya Sita turns into ashes while the true Sita reappears before the world. A popular Indian television series Ramayan (1987–88) by Ramanand Sagar reveals that Maya Sita had replaced Sita only in the Agni Pariksha scene and uses flashback to narrate about the exchange.

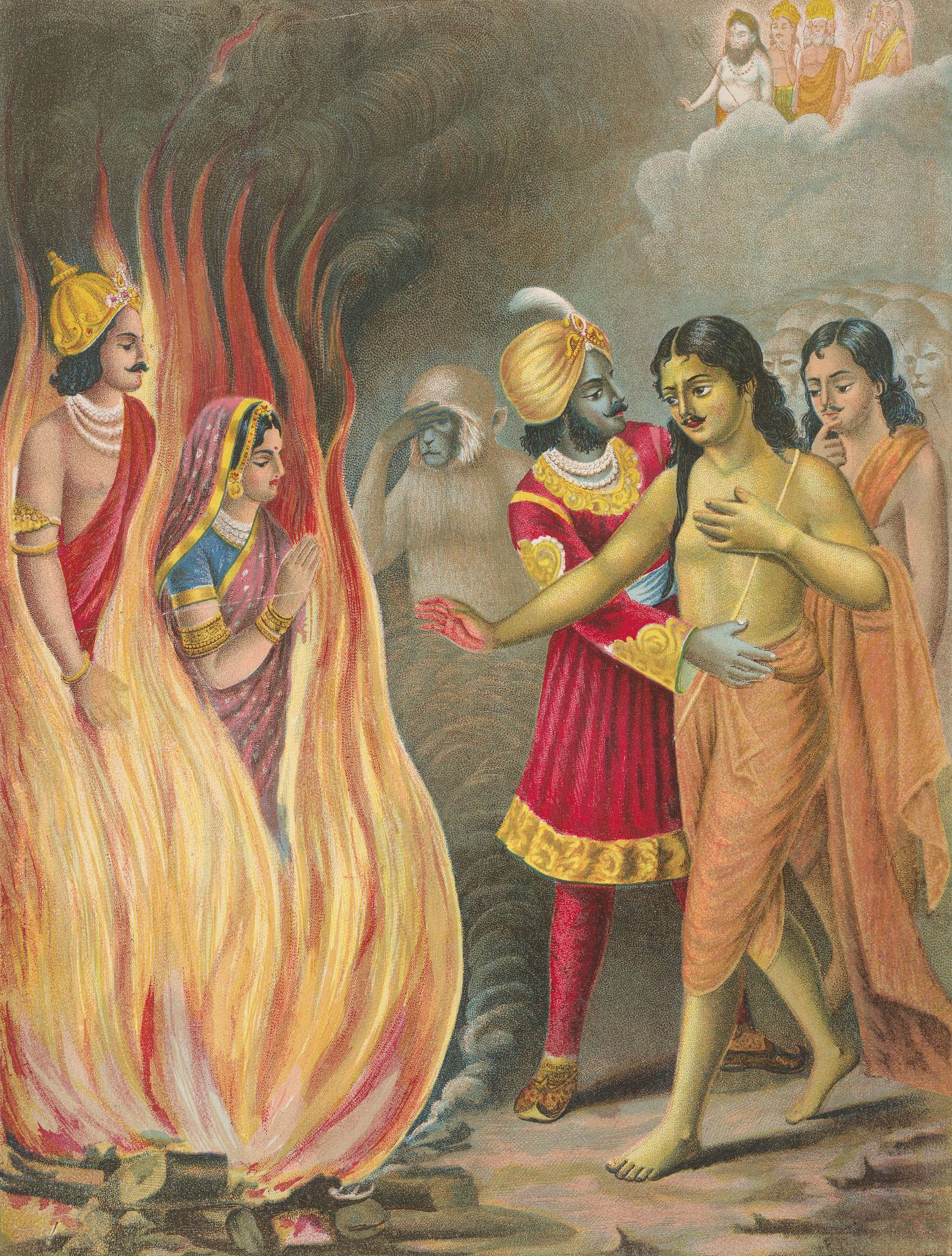
A distressed Rama (right) looks on as Sita (left) protected by Agni, undergoes Agni Pariksha. Maya Sita is replaced by Sita in the Agni Pariksha episode.

The Brahma Vaivarta Purana and the Devi Bhagavata Purana narratives are similar to each other and divulge about Maya Sita's life after Agni Pariksha. The Devi Bhagavata Purana states: Agni comes, disguised as a brahmin, to Rama and informs him that he had been sent by the gods to warn Rama about the future, when Rama will fulfil the purpose of his birth on earth and slay Ravana; Sita would be abducted by Ravana and would lead to his downfall. Agni requests Rama to hand over Sita to him for safekeeping and substitute her with Maya Sita; after Ravana's destruction when Sita would be asked to prove her chastity by entering fire, Maya Sita will be replaced with the real Sita again. Rama consents. Agni mediates and creates Maya Sita, who looks perfectly like the original Sita. Maya Sita and Sita switch places and Agni disappears with the real Sita, extracting the promise from Rama that the replacement of Sita remains secret; not even Lakshmana should know. Maya Sita longs for the illusional deer and is consequently kidnapped. As per the plan, Maya Sita vanished in the fire at Agni Pariksha and real Sita comes out.

When Rama abandons the young Maya Sita at Agni Pariksha, she – worried about her uncertain future – questions Rama and Agni about what should she do now. They advise her to go to Pushkar and perform austerities Tapas and prophesy that she will be become Svargalakshmi ("Lakshmi of the heaven") as the result of her asceticism. Shiva is pleased with her penance and promises to grant her desired boon. Maya Sita, who is transformed into Svargalakshmi by practising austerities for three lakh years, anxiously repeats five times that she get a husband. Shiva blesses her that she will be born as Draupadi, the princess of Pancala, who will have five husbands. Draupadi, the heroine of the Mahabharata, is born out of the flames of a yajna (fire sacrifice) of Drupada (King of Panchala) and later becomes the common wife of the five Pandava brothers, princes of Kuru kingdom. The text also declares that in previous birth, Maya Sita was Vedavati, a woman Ravana tries to rape and who curses Ravana that she will be the cause of his ruin. Since she has taken birth in three yugas (ages; a cycle of four ages is believed to repeat) – Vedavati in Satya Yuga, Maya Sita in Treta Yuga and Draupadi in Dvapara Yuga, she is known as Trihayani, the one who appears in the three ages.

The Tamil text Sri Venkatachala Mahatyam relates Maya Sita to Vedavati, but her next birth is Padmavati, not Radha. After Ravana tries to molest Vedavati, she curses him that she would destroy his clan. She seeks the protection of Agni. Agni consoles her and gives her not only shelter but also the opportunity to take her vengeance. He disguises Vedavati as Sita, who is going to be kidnapped by Ravana and hides the real Sita in his refuge. At the time of Agni Pariksha, Vedavati enters the fire and Agni accompanies Sita and Vedavati out in public. Rama is perplexed seeing the two Sitas. The real Sita informs Rama that Vedavati was abducted in her place and suffered the incarceration in Lanka. She demands Rama to marry Vedavati, however Rama refuses citing his vow to have only one wife in this birth. He promises that in Kali Yuga (the present and final age), when he appear on earth as Venkateshwara, Vedavati will be born as Padmavati, whom he will marry. Unlike Sanskrit texts, Agni plans the whole thing and Sita conspires with him to protect herself, but also safeguards the surrogate Sita's interests.

In the Malayalam Adhyatma Ramayana by Thunchaththu Ezhuthachan (16th century), Vedavati – disguised as Sita – appears before Sita from the latter's kitchen fire and volunteers to be kidnapped in Sita's place. As per Vedavati's advice, Sita hides in fire and lives in Agni's protection. After Agni Pariksha when Sita is reunited with Rama, Vedavati is blessed to marry Vishnu in Kali Yuga.

Sometimes, Sita replaces Maya Sita temporarily before the Agni Pariksha. The Ramayana narrates that the monkey-god Hanuman, a devotee of Rama, was sent by Rama to seek Sita and eventually succeeds in discovering her whereabouts in Lanka; where she meets with him. Sundd's Sri Sankat Mochan Hanuman Charit Manas (1998), a devotional text attributed to Tulsidas and devoted to Hanuman, uses the Maya Sita motif, but raises the question how Hanuman could interact with such devotion with a false Sita. Sita takes the place of Maya Sita in captivity temporarily to meet the great devotee.

== Divine doubles: inspiration and influences ==
Though the tale of Maya Sita told in the Ramayana adaptations is absent from the original, the concept of Maya Sita first appears in the epic itself. In the battle between Rama and Ravana, Indrajit – the son of Ravana – creates an illusionary Sita (Maya Sita) and kills her in front of Rama's general Hanuman, as a war tactic to dampen the spirits of Rama's army. Hanuman reports it to Rama, who is also dejected by the news. However, they soon realise that it must be an illusion of Indrajit. Another surrogate Sita appears in a later interpolation of the epic. At the end of the Ramayana, a golden image of Sita is subsisted for the real Sita to be on side of Rama in sacrifices, after Sita's abandonment by Rama when her chastity is questioned by his subjects.

The Ananda Ramayana does have the Maya Sita, who is kidnapped by Ravana, but has an illusory Sita called rajatamomayi chaya ("shadow of Rajas and Tamas elements") of Sita, who is abandoned by Rama while the sattva-rupa ("sattva form") – the real Sita – remains unseen by her husband's left side, the traditional place of a Hindu wife. Kamban's Ramavataram (12th century) narrates that Shurpanakha – the sister of Ravana – impersonates Sita to seduce Rama, but her trickery is exposed by him. In a 14th-century Nepalese drama, Shurpanakha disguises as Sita, but Rama is fooled by her appearance. When real Sita also appears, Rama is perplexed. However, Lakshmana tests the two Sitas and rightly judges the real one. The Ramcharitmanas narrates that the goddess Sati, wife of the god Shiva, tries to test Rama by appearing before him disguised as Sita when he is searching for his kidnapped wife. However, Rama sees through her disguise; Shiva abandons her, angry with her action.

In some adaptations of the Ramayana, other characters also use surrogates to save themselves from Ravana. A Tamil text narrates how Ravana once asks for Parvati as boon from her husband Shiva, however Vishnu – disguised as a sage – deludes Ravana into believing Shiva granted him an illusionary Parvati. Ravana entrusts Parvati to Vishnu and mediates again to compel Shiva to give him the real Parvati. This time, Shiva gives an illusionary Parvati, which he accepts as the real one and returns to Lanka with her. In the Malay Ramayana, Ravana sets his eyes on Rama's mother, however she transforms a frog into her image and sends this surrogate to be Ravana's wife.

Other divinities also employ surrogates to meet their own needs. In the Puranas, Sati commits suicide by immolating herself when Shiva is insulted and is reborn as Parvati and becomes Shiva's consort again. In a later Sanskrit text, Sati creates a surrogate who burns herself, while the real Sati is reborn as Parvati. In the Mahabharata, the goddess Svaha assumes the form of six of the wives of the Saptarishi (seven great sages), with whom Agni is in love with, and has coitus with him. Later, Svaha marries Agni.

Other cultures also employ surrogates to save protagonists from pain. Christian Gnostic traditions suggest that Simon of Cyrene as the man who was crucified, instead of Jesus, a concept deemed heretical. Unlike Christianity, "divine doubles" are accepted in Hindu and Greek tales. In some retellings of the Trojan War saga, a phantom Helen of Troy is kidnapped by Paris which brings upon the great war; a story parallel to the story of abduction of Maya Sita by Ravana.
