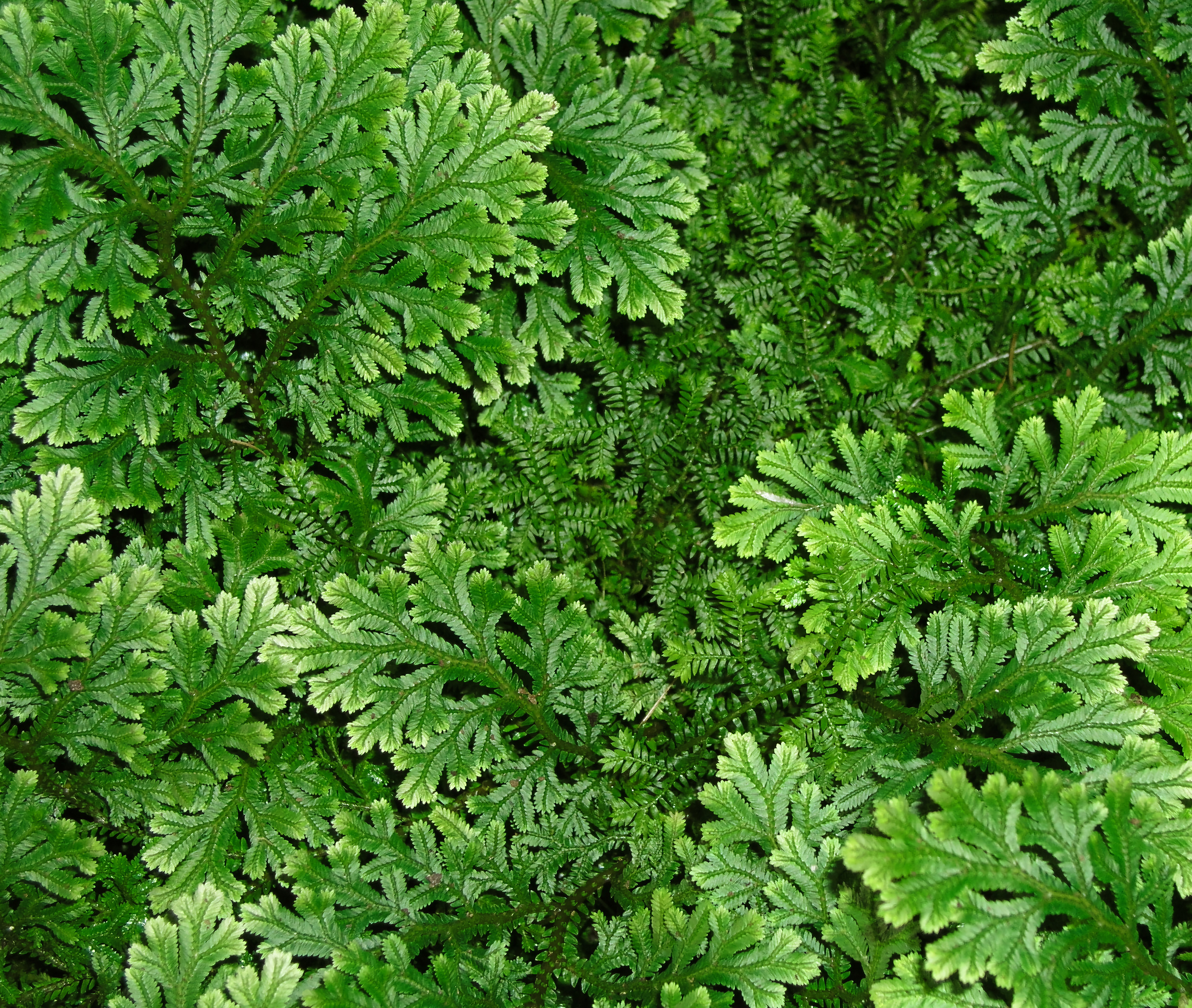

Scientific classification
- Kingdom: Plantae
- Clade: Tracheophytes
- Clade: Lycophytes
- Class: Lycopodiopsida
- Order: Selaginellales
- Family: Selaginellaceae
- Genus: Selaginella
- Species: S. bryopteris

Binomial name
- Selaginella bryopteris (L.) Baker, 1884

Synonyms
- Lycopodium bryopteris L. Lycopodium circinale L.

= Selaginella bryopteris =

Species of plant

Selaginella bryopteris (Devanagari:संजीवनी) is a lithophytic plant that is native to India. It is used medicinally in India and is one of the plants that is considered as a candidate to be the sanjeevani (also called "sanjeevini"or "sanjivini booti") plant.

The popular name sanjeevani translates as "one that infuses life," and derives from a plant that appears in the Ramayana. Other medicinal plants are also called sanjeevani. The botanical identity of the plant described in the Ramayana is unclear, although Selaginella bryopteris has been suggested as a candidate.

Sanjeevani grows on the hills of tropical areas, particularly in the Aravalli Range of mountains in India. Traditional uses include relief from heat stroke, dysuria, irregular menstruation, and jaundice, but the effectiveness has not been scientifically validated. It is also useful for coma patient by way of inhalation.
