= Pareu, Balotra =

Village in Rajasthan, India

Pareu
- Village
- Location within Rajasthan Location within India
- Coordinates: 26°11′09″N 72°05′24″E
- Country: India
- State: Rajasthan
- District: Balotra

Area
  - Total: 1,005 ha (2,480 acres)

Population (2011)
  - Total: 1,640
- Time zone: UTC+5:30 (IST)
- PIN: 344032
- ISO 3166 code: RJ-IN

Pareu is a village in Gida tehsil, Balotra district, Rajasthan, India. Pareu has a total population of 1,640 according to the 2011 census.

== Notable people ==
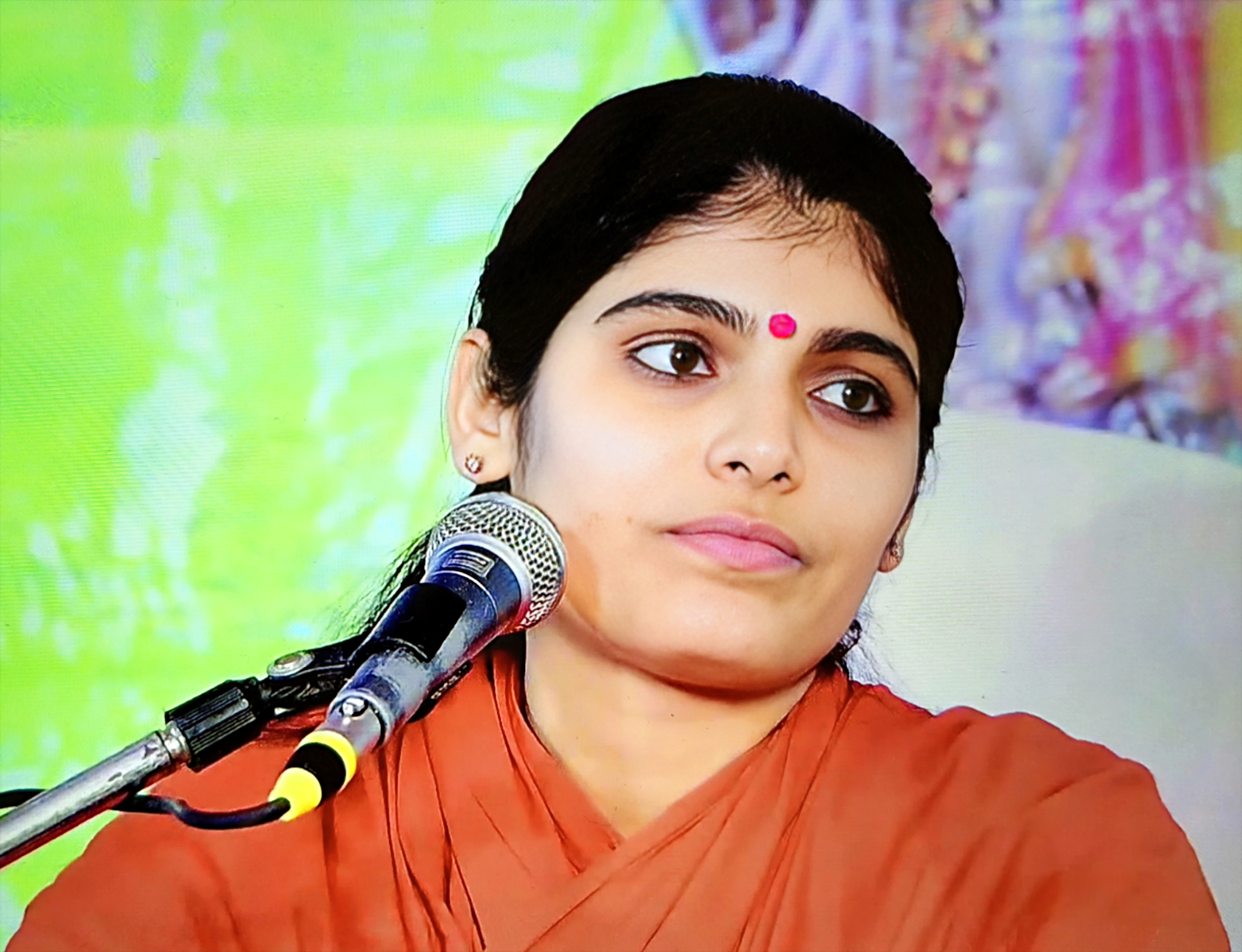
Prem Baisa

- Sadhvi Prem Baisa, Indian religious storyteller and sadhvi.
