= Vedavati =

Previous birth of Sita in Hinduism

- Possessor of the Vedas
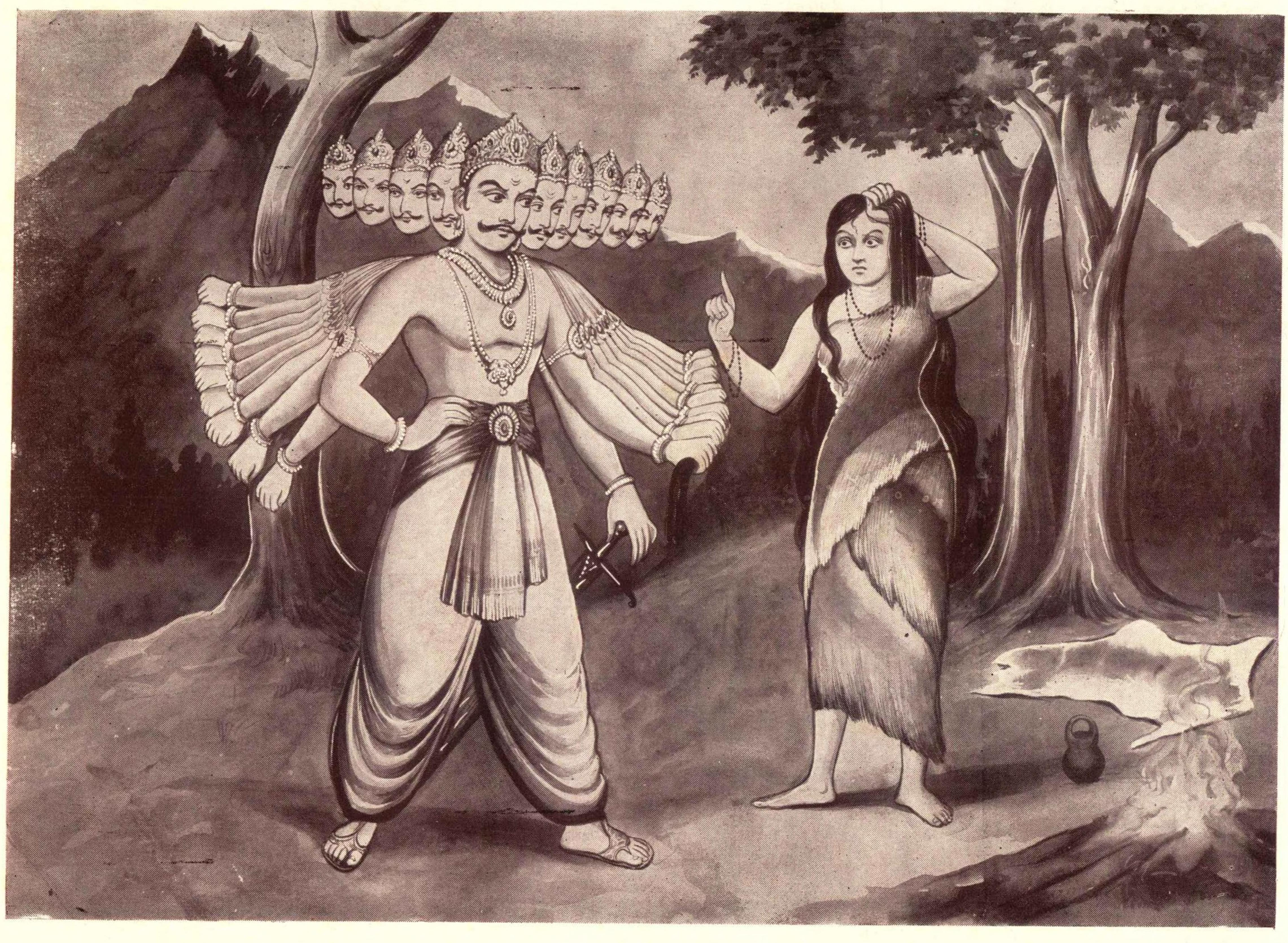
- Vedavati thwarts the advances of Ravana
- Affiliation: Devi; Sita; Sri; Padmavati
- Texts: Puranas, Ramayana

Genealogy
- Parents: Kushadhvaja (father); Malyavati (mother)

Vedavati (Sanskrit: वेदवती, IAST: Vedavatī) is the previous birth of the goddess Sita in Hinduism. She is an avatar of the goddess Lakshmi.

== Legend ==
=== Birth ===
Vedavati was the daughter of Kushadhvaja, who was the son of Brihaspati, the guru of the devas. Having spent his life chanting and studying the sacred Vedas, he named his daughter Vedavati, as the one who possesses all the knowledge of the Vedas, for she was born to him as the divine fruit of his bhakti and intense tapasya towards goddess Lakshmi. Vedavati had uttered the Vedic mantras the moment she was born, radiating divine purity and tapas from her very first breath.

=== Dedication to Vishnu ===
Vedavati's father wanted his child to have the preserver god Vishnu as her husband. He thus rejected many powerful kings and celestial beings who sought his daughter's hand. Outraged by his rejection, demon King Sumbha murdered her parents in the middle of a moonless night.

Vedavati continued to live in the ashram of her parents, meditating night and day and performing a great tapasya to win Vishnu for her husband.

The Ramayana describes her as wearing the hide of a black antelope, her hair matted in a jata, like a rishi. She is inexpressibly beautiful, in the bloom of her youth, enhanced by her tapasya.

=== Immolation ===
Ravana, the king of Lanka and the rakshasa race, found Vedavati sitting in meditation as a tapasvini and was captivated by her incredible beauty. He proposed his hand in marriage to her, and was rejected. Ravana, firmly rejected at every turn, grabbed her hair and tried assaulting her. The furious Vedavati cursed Ravana that she would be born once more, and would be the cause of his death. She subsequently leapt into the ritual havan that was present in her vicinity, immolating herself. Vedavati would be born again as Sita, and as proclaimed, she was the triggering cause of Ravana and his relatives's death, though her husband Rama would be the agent.

=== Rebirth ===
According to the Brahma Vaivarta Purana, Vedavati encountered the goddess Parvati during the duration of her penance. Pleased by her devotion, the goddess offered Vedavati a boon of her choice. Vedavati desired Narayana as her husband in his every incarnation on earth, and sought the devotion of his lotus feet. Cognisant of Vedavati's true identity as a manifestation of Lakshmi, Parvati promised that she would have all that she sought, informing her that Narayana would assume the avatar of Rama to cleanse the earth of its evil during the Treta Yuga, and that she would be his consort. Lakshmi reincarnated herself as a child upon a farm in the kingdom of Mithila, where she was discovered by the King Janaka. Stupified by the sight of the infant whose skin shone like molten gold, Janaka heard an akashvani, a celestial announcement from the heavens that the child would become the bride of Narayana. Overjoyed, Janaka raised her as his own daughter Janaki, better known as Sita.

=== Maya Sita ===
Another variant in the Brahma Vaivarta Purana, the Devi Bhagavata Purana, the Tamil text Sri Venkatachala Mahatyam and the Malayalam Adhyatma Ramayana associates Vedavati with Maya Sita, an illusionary duplicate of Sita. When Vedavati enters the fire to immolate herself, the fire-god Agni provides her refuge. When Sita is to be kidnapped by Ravana, Sita seeks shelter in the fire and exchanges places with Maya Sita, who is Vedavati in her previous birth. Ravana abducts Maya Sita, mistaking her to be Sita. After death of Ravana by Sita's husband Rama, Sita and Maya Sita switch places in the Agni Pariksha.

In other stories, which follow the idea of Vedavati as Maya Sita, it is said that during the Agni Pariksha, Maya Sita's existence and identity as Vedavati (essentially an amshavatara of Lakshmi) is revealed by Agni. Having been abused by Ravana and won by Rama, Vedavati asked the king to be her husband. Rama, being of utmost loyalty to Sita, declines, but promises her his hand in another incarnation. This similarly occurs with Jambavan, whose daughter Jambavati becomes Krishna's wife, and a naga princess named Chandrasena (an incarnation of Bhudevi) while in Lanka, who was born Krishna's third wife, Satyabhama. Vedavati was born to Akasha Raja as Padmavati, when she married Venkateswara.

== See also ==
- Vedavathi River
- Padmavati
- Draupadi
- Maya Sita
