= Oshadhiparvata =

Mythological mountain within the Ramayana

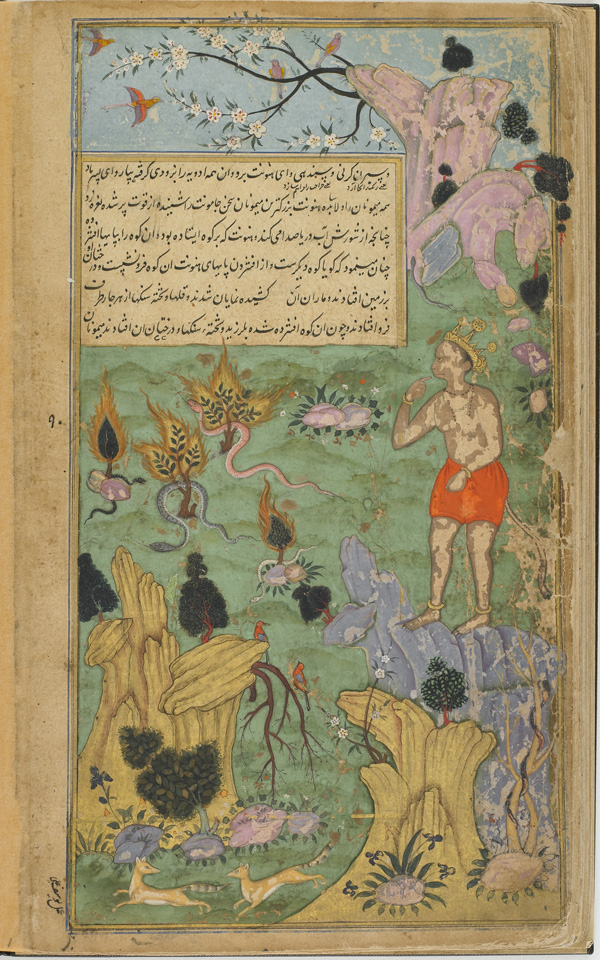
At Jambavan's urging, Hanuman goes to the Himalayas to find the four healing plants

Oshadhiparvata (Sanskrit: ओषधिपर्वत, romanized: Oṣadhiparvata, lit. 'herb mountain') is a mythological mountain featured in the Ramayana. It is described to possess a number of medicinal plants growing upon its summit. In the Ramayana, the bear-king Jambavan requests the vanara Hanuman to travel to Oshadhiparvata and carry the medicinal herbs that grow on its southern summit to the battlefield in Lanka for healing the army of Rama.

== Literature ==
In the Ramayana, observing the serious injuries afflicting the army of Rama, Jambavan urged Hanuman to fly to the Himalayas, and locate the Oshadhiparvata, the peak present between the mountains of Kailasha and Meru. He informed the vanara that he would be able to identify the mountain by the luminescence of the healing herbs growing upon them in the dark. He instructed him to collect four herbs, known as the mritasanjivini, vishalyakarani, savarnyakarani, and the santanakarani. These four herbs are stated to heal all wounds, no matter how grievous. Hanuman flew towards the mountain, but realised that the glimmering plants appeared to vanish when he ventured close to them. Growing to massive proportions, Hanuman uprooted the mountain and carried it upon his palm to Lanka. The herbs were used to heal and restore the lives of the fallen warriors on the side of Rama. After his forces were healed, the deity asked Hanuman to restore the mountain to its original location, which he swiftly performed.

== Sources ==
- Dictionary of Hindu Lore and Legend (ISBN 0-500-51088-1) by Anna Dallapiccola
