= Alaka =

City of Kubera in Hindu mythology

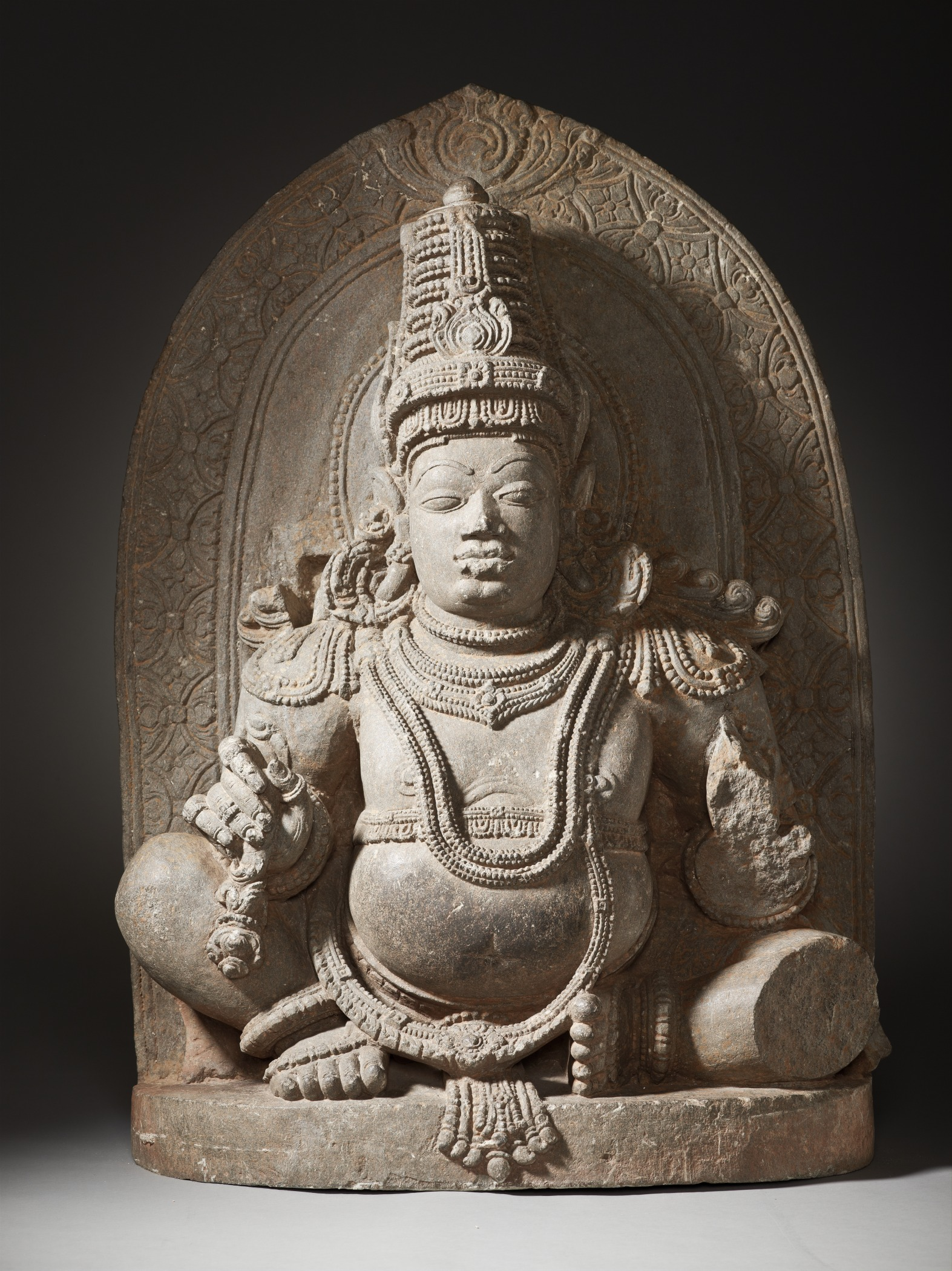
A statue of Kubera

Alaka (Sanskrit: अलका, romanized: Alakā), also called Alakapuri or Alkavati, is a city featured in Hinduism. It is the home of Kubera, the king of a race called the yakshas and the god of wealth. The Mahabharata mentions this city as the capital of the Yaksha kingdom. This city is said to rival Amaravati, the capital of Indra, the king of the devas, in its architecture, opulence, and overall splendour. It is quoted in the Sanskrit lyrical poem Meghadūta by Kalidasa.

== Description ==
Kubera establishes his rule over the yakshas and founds his new capital near Kailasha after having lost the kingdom of Lanka to his half-brother Ravana.

Alaka is sometimes referred to as the most splendid city in the world, under the rule of Kubera. The yakshas of the city are stated to guard it, wielding javelins and swords.

In the Bhagavata Purana, Dhruva is described to have once attacked this city, slaying thousands of yakshas in vengeance for the death of his brother at the hands of a yaksha. He ceased when his grandfather, Manu, intervened and convinced him to cease his bloodshed.

The Brahmanda Purana describes Parashurama's visit to Kailasha, observing Alaka along the journey. The text describes the city to be alluring due to it being filled with mansions and palaces, which were spangled with numerous varieties of jewels. The yakshas of the city are stated to have assumed various forms, which were decorated with marvellous ornaments. The city boasted groves, parks, and gardens, all of which were replete with various species of trees. Enormous lakes and tanks are stated to be present in the city. The river known as Alakanandā, a branch of the Ganges, is described to surround its perimeter. Elephants, despite the fact that they experienced no thirst, consumed its waters, and turned lawny in hue. This is stated to be due to the fact that saffron is mixed into it when the apsaras bathe in it. Music is heard in the city, composed by the gandharvas as well as the apsaras.
