= Sri Ramayanamu =

Indian book

- Author: Katta Varadaraju
- Language: Telugu
- Subject: Valmiki Ramayana
- Published: 1950-53
- Publisher: Government Oriental Manuscripts Library, Madras
- Publication place: India
- Media type: Print

Sri Ramayanamu (Telugu: శ్రీ రామాయణము) is the magnum opus work by Katta Varadaraju in Telugu based on the Hindu epic Ramayana. This Ramayana presented to the Telugu public for the first time is a unique production of Dwipada Kavya, which belongs to Desi or indigenous literary compositions.

== The author ==
The author Katta Varadaraju is a 16th-century poet and also a ruler after the Vijayanagara period. He is already known to the literary world through the publication of his Prabandha Srirangamāhātmyam in 1921. He is a Kshatriya of the solar race and a descendant of the famous Karikala Chola, who constructed the anicut (Kattu in Telugu) on the river Kaveri, from which his house or family name Katta is derived. He is the son of Haridasaraju and his grandfather was Rangappa Raju, an ally of Ramadevarayulu of the Aravidu dynasty. The latter ruled at Chandragiri from 1614 to 1632 and is a cousin of our Varadaraju. An inscription states that Varadarāja's father was living in 1637 A.D. and hence it can be said that Varadaraju was living in about 1650 A.D. The last Telugu poet whom Varadaraju mentions is Allasani Peddana, the poet laureate in the time of Krishna Devaraya (1509–30). Varadaraju is a staunch vaishnavite and a disciple of one Etirājācharya. He is a sincere devotee of God Sri Venkateswara of Tirupati,

His other available works are Srirangamāhātmyamu and Paramabhāgavatacharitra. The former work is a translation of Satādhyāyi from Garuda Purana describing the greatness of the shrine at Srirangam. It is in ten cantos and written in classical prabandha style. The latter work is also a Prabantha in 8 cantoes and deals with the lives of the 14 devotees (Parama Bhakthas, i.e. Prahlada, Nārada, Parašara, Pundarika, Vyasa, Ambarisa, Śuka, Saunaka, Bhisma, Dalbhya, Rukmangada, Arjuna, Vaśīstha, and Vibhāşana). Unfortunately the whole work is not available.

== Publication ==
The Government Oriental Manuscripts Library, Madras published this work in four volumes. The first volume consists of Balakanda and Ayodhya Kandas, second volume consists of Aranya and Kishkindha Kandas, third volume consists of Sundara Kanda and the fourth volume consists of Yuddha kanda.

The only manuscript copy of this work is preserved in the Thanjavur Maharaja Serfojis Sarawswathi Mahal Library. This great work is published by the authorities of the Tanjore Palace Library under the patronage of the Madras Government. All the volumes are critically edited with detailed introduction written by N. Venkata Rao, senior lecturer and Head of the Telugu department, Madras University.

== Legacy ==
Kadiyana Venkataramana has done critical analysis of Sri Ramayanamu of Katta Varadaraju in 1986, as a part of thesis work under the guidance of K. J. Krishna Murthy. It was published by Sri Venkateswara University, Tirupati with a title Katta Varadarajakavi Dwipada Ramayanamu – Oka Pariseelana in 1998.
