= Mandakranta metre =

Mandākrāntā (Sanskrit: मन्दाक्रान्ता) is the name of a metre commonly used in classical Sanskrit poetry. The name in Sanskrit means "slow-stepping" or "slowly advancing". It is said to have been invented by India's most famous poet Kālidāsa, (5th century CE), who used it in his well-known poem Meghadūta ("the Cloud-Messenger"). The metre characterises the longing of lovers who are separated from each other, expressed in the Sanskrit word viraha विरह "separation (of lovers), parting".

== Metrical pattern ==
=== Modern analysis ===
A line in mandākrāntā has 17 syllables, divided into three sections, each separated by a pause. The first section consists of four long syllables, the second of 5 short syllables and one long, and the third a mixture of long and short alternating, in this pattern:

| – – – – | u u u u u – | – u – – u – x |

As with other Sanskrit metres, the length of the final syllable is indifferent.

Deo (2007) argues that the mandākrāntā metre is basically trochaic (i.e. consisting of a "strong-weak, strong-weak" rhythm). She notes that where the third strong beat should come (after the fourth syllable), some performers traditionally leave a pause equivalent to one short syllable; the third strong beat is then silent, and the fourth strong beat then falls on the fourth short syllable. Deo argues that this rhythm is also (a variation of) trochaic, with a strong beat on the 1st, 4th, and 7th syllables.

=== Relationship to other metres ===
The final section of 7 syllables is also found at the end of other metres such as śālinī, mālinī, candriṇī, sragdharā, and vaiśvadēvī. The śālinī metre, a variety of triṣṭubh, goes as follows:

| – – – – | – u – – u – x |

It thus consists of the beginning and end of the mandākrāntā without the central section.

The 21-syllable sragdharā metre goes as follows:

| – – – – u – – | u u u u u u – | – u – – u – x |

This is the same as the mandākrāntā except for an additional four syllables. It has been argued that both mandākrāntā and sragdharā are later expansions of the earlier śālinī, which occurs occasionally even in the Vedas mixed with other varieties of triṣṭubh.

If compared with the traditional ślōka metre, the mandākrāntā can be seen to be similar. For example, the first line of the Bhagavad Gita scans as follows:

| – – – – | u – – – || u u – – | u – u – |

whereas the mandākrāntā metre is as follows:

| – – – – | u uu uu – || – u – – | u – – |

The differences are as follows:

- The ślōka can have many variations but in the mandākrāntā every verse is the same.
- The break after the first quarter is obligatory in mandākrāntā, but optional in a śloka.
- The second quarter has resolutions, i.e. u uu uu – instead of u – – –.
- The fourth quarter of the line is catalectic, i.e. u – – instead of u – u –.
- In a ślōka two lines make a stanza, but in mandākrāntā there are four lines in a stanza.

=== Traditional scansion ===
The traditional Indian method of analysing metre is to use three-syllable patterns known as gaṇa, which are algebraically represented by letters of the alphabet. (See Sanskrit prosody.) So, the 11th/12th century metrician Kedārabhaṭṭa in his work Vṛtta-ratnākara characterised the mandākrāntā metre by the following mnemonic line, which is itself in the mandākrāntā metre:

मन्दाक्रान्ता जलधिषडगैर्म्भौ नतौ तो गुरू चेत्
mandākrāntā jaladhi-ṣaḍ-agair mbhau natau tād-gurū cēt

The meaning of this line is that the metre has a pause after four syllables (jaladhi = ocean, traditionally four in number), then after six (ṣaḍ = six), and can be described using the gaṇas (trisyllabic metrical patterns) ma bha na ta ta followed by two long (or heavy) syllables, known as guru, that is:

(– – –) ( – | u u ) ( u u u ) (– | – u) (– – u) (–) (–)

== Kālidāsa's Mēghadūta ==
The first poem to use the mandākrāntā metre appears to have been Kālidāsa's Mēghadūta or Mēghadūtam "the Cloud-Messenger". This consists of approximately 120 four-line stanzas, each line identical in metre. The opening stanza of the poem is as follows:

कश्चित् कान्ताविरहगुरुणा स्वाधिकारात् प्रमत्तः
शापेनास्तंगमितमहिमा वर्षभोग्येण भर्तुः ।
यक्षश्चक्रे जनकतनयास्नानपुण्योदकेषु
स्निग्धच्छायातरुषु वसतिं रामगिर्याश्रमेषु ॥ १ ॥

kaścit kāntā-, viraha-guruṇā, svādhikārāt pramattaḥ
śāpēn-āstaṃ-, gamita-mahimā, varṣa-bhogyēṇa bhartuḥ
yakṣaścakre, janaka-tanayā-, snāna-puṇyōdakeṣu
snigdha-cchāyā-, taruṣu vasatiṃ, rāma-giry-āśramēṣu

"Separated painfully from his beloved, after being negligent of his duty,
having lost his power by a curse, lasting for a year, of his master,
a certain yakṣa (nature deity) took up, where the water was made pure by the bathing of Janaka's daughter (Sita)
and shady trees were densely clustered, his residence in Rama's mountain hermitages."

== Later use ==
Kālidāsa's poem was admired and imitated by many later poets, giving rise to a genre known as saṁdēśa-kāvya "message poems" or dūta-kāvya "messenger poems", mostly in the same metre, although other metres are sometimes used. The mandākrāntā metre was also used in the play Mālatīmādhava by Bhavabhūti (8th century), for a scene in which the abandoned lover Mādhava searches for a cloud to take a message to his beloved Mālatī.

== Bibliography ==
- Deo, Ashwini S. (2007). "The Metrical Organization of Classical Sanskrit Verse". Journal of Linguistics, Vol. 43, No. 1 (Mar., 2007), pp. 63–114.
- Michael Hahn: "A brief introduction into the Indian metrical system for the use of students" (pdf)
- Lienhard, Siegfried (1984). A History of Classical Poetry: Sanskrit, Pali, Prakrit.
- Morgan, Les; Sharma, Ram Karan; Biduck, Anthony (2011). Croaking Frogs: A Guide to Sanskrit Metrics and Figures of Speech.
- Pathak, K. B. (1916) Kālidāsa's Meghadūta Sanskrit and English text with notes.
- Reddy, Srinavas (trans.) (2017). Kalidasa: Meghadutam: The Cloud Messenger. (Penguin).
- Sadhale, D. V. (1895). The Meghaduta of Kalidas. Sanskrit and English text with notes.
- Wikisource Sanskrit text of the Meghadūta
