= Meghadūta =

Sanskrit lyric poem by Kalidasa

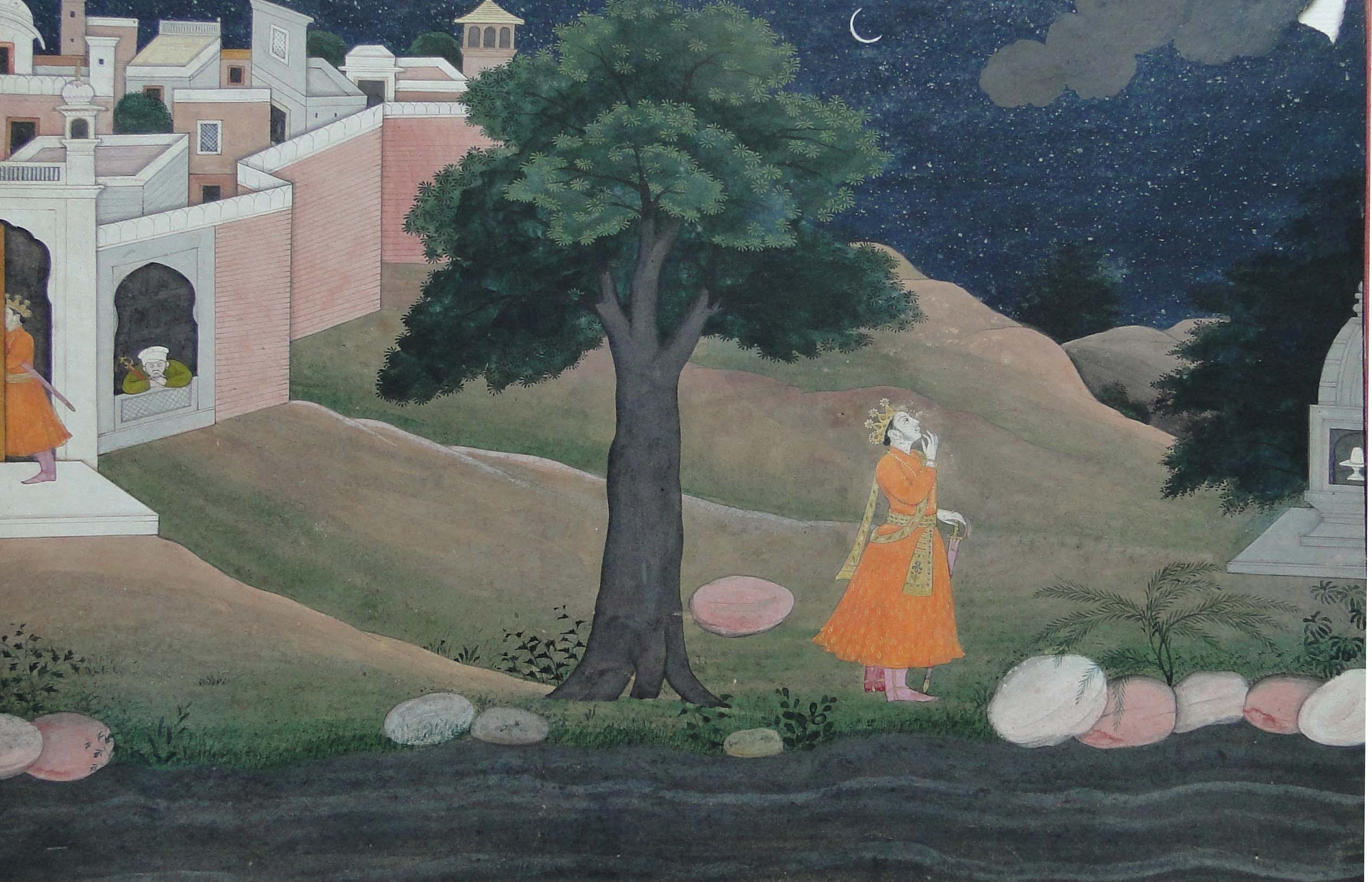
King looking at a cloud in a night sky. Meghadūta illustration. Guler School of Pahari painting, c. 1800. Lahore Museum

A 1665 CE manuscript of Meghadūtam in Newar script

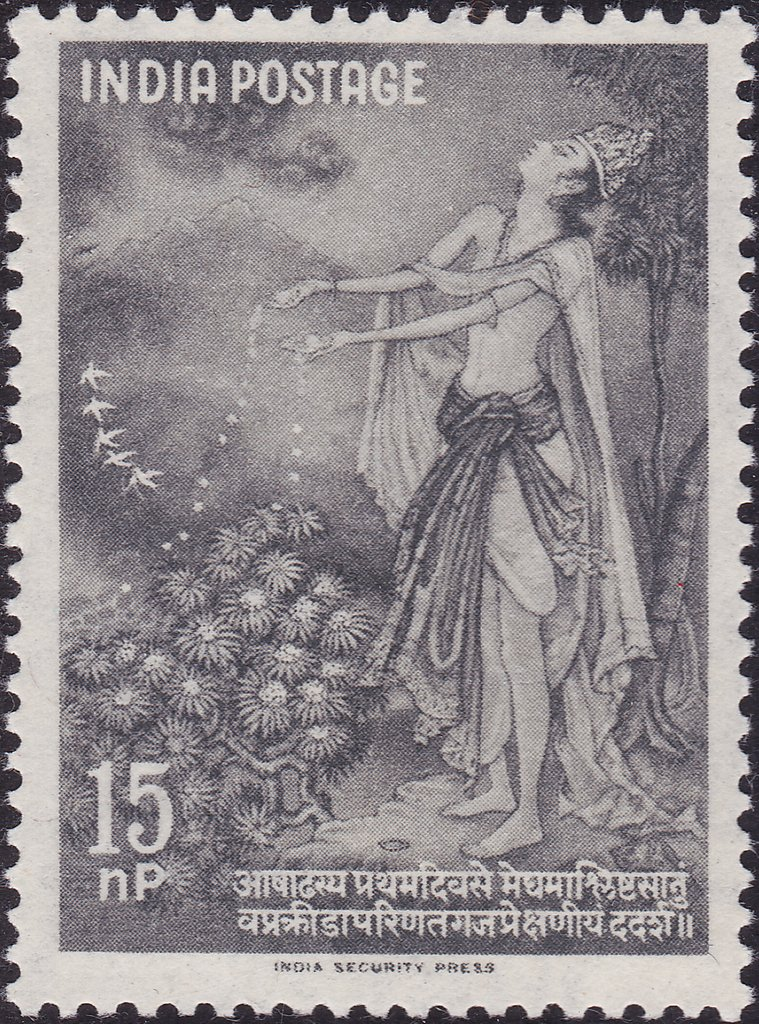
A scene from Meghaduta with the yaksha and the cloud messenger, with the first verse of the poem - on an Indian stamp (1960)

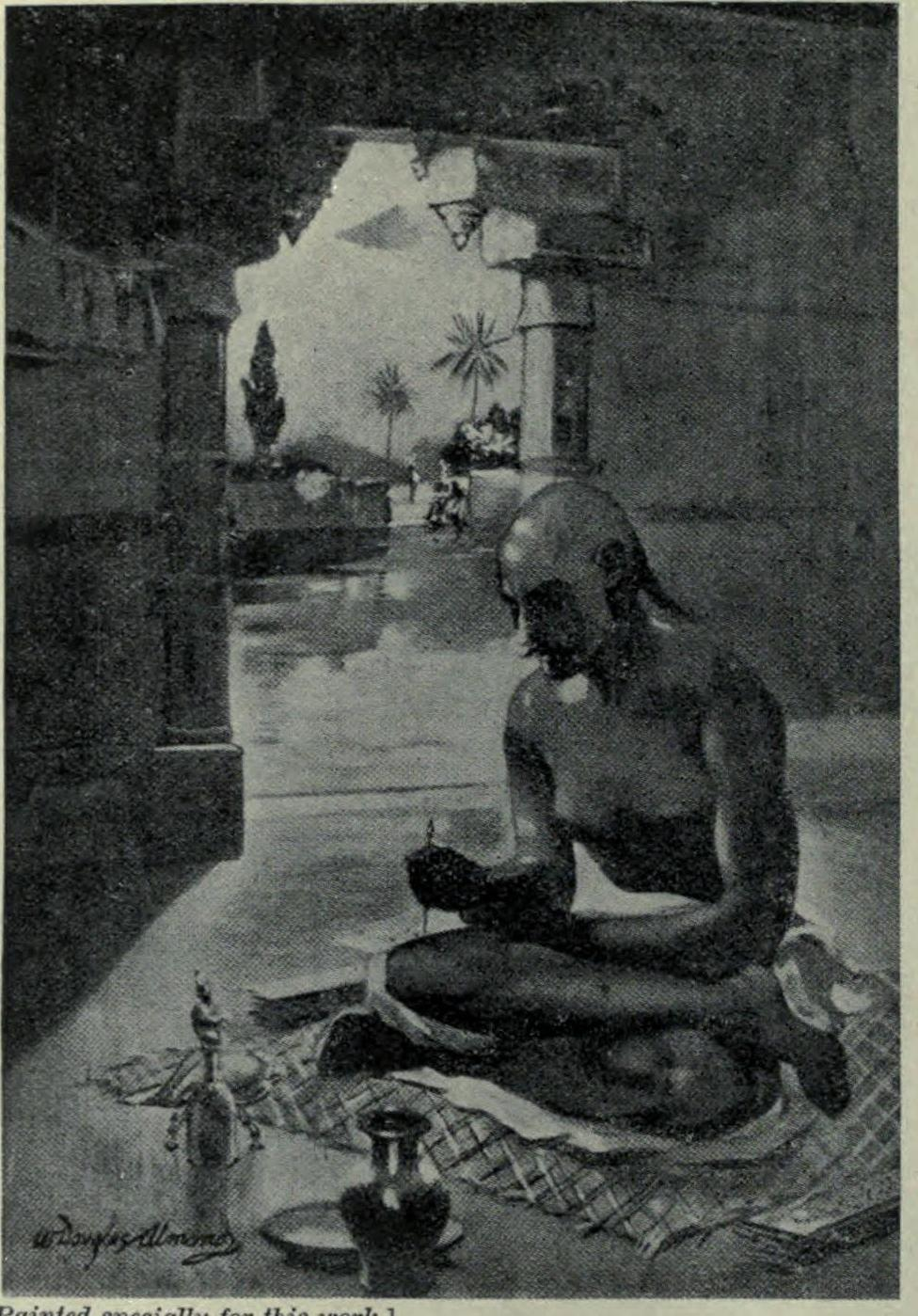
Artist's impression of Kalidasa composing the Meghaduta

Meghadūta (Bengali: মেঘদূত, Telugu: మేఘదూత, Sanskrit: मेघदूतम्, literally Cloud Messenger) is a lyric poem written by Kālidāsa (c. 4th–5th century CE), considered to be one of the greatest classical Sanskrit poets. It describes how a yakṣa (or nature spirit), who had been banished by his master to a remote region for a year, asked a cloud to take a message of love to his wife. The poem became well-known in Bengali literature and inspired other poets to write similar poems (known as "messenger-poems", or Sandesha Kavya) on similar themes. A Telugu poet, Korada Ramachandra Sastri wrote Ghanavrttam in Sanskrit, a sequel to Meghaduta.

== About the poem ==
A poem of 120 stanzas, it is one of Kālidāsa's most famous works. The work is divided into two parts, Purva-megha and Uttara-megha. It recounts how a yakṣa, a subject of King Kubera (the god of wealth), after being exiled for a year to Central India for neglecting his duties, convinces a passing cloud to take a message to his wife at Alaka on Mount Kailāsa in the Himālaya mountains. The yakṣa accomplishes this by describing the many beautiful sights the cloud will see on its northward course to the city of Alakā, where his wife awaits his return.

In Sanskrit literature, the poetic conceit used in the Meghaduta spawned the genre of Sandesa Kavya or messenger poems, most of which are modeled on the Meghaduta (and are often written in the Meghaduta's Mandākrāntā metre). Examples include the Hamsa-sandesha, in which Rama asks a Hansa Bird to carry a message to Sita, describing sights along the journey.

In 1813, the poem was first translated into English by Horace Hayman Wilson. Since then, it has been translated several times into various languages. As with the other major works of Sanskrit literature, the most famous traditional commentary on the poem is by Mallinātha.

The great scholar of Sanskrit literature, Arthur Berriedale Keith, wrote of this poem: "It is difficult to praise too highly either the brilliance of the description of the cloud’s progress or the pathos of the picture of the wife sorrowful and alone. Indian criticism has ranked it highest among Kalidasa’s poems for brevity of expression, richness of content, and power to elicit sentiment, and the praise is not undeserved."

It is believed the picturesque Ramtek near Nagpur inspired Kalidasa to write the poem.

== Visualisation of Meghadūta ==
Meghadūta describes several scenes and has inspired many artists, including the drawings by Nana Joshi. An excerpt is quoted in Canadian director Deepa Mehta's film, Water. Simon Armitage appears to reference Meghaduta in his poem "Lockdown".

The composer Fred Momotenko wrote the composition 'Cloud-Messenger', music for a multimedia performance with recorder, dance, projected animation and electronics in surround audio. The world premiere was at Festival November Music, with Hans Tuerlings (choreography), Jasper Kuipers (animation), Jorge Isaac (blockflutes) and dancers Gilles Viandier and Daniela Lehmann.

The English composer Gustav Holst set the Meghadūta to music in his 1910 choral work, The Cloud Messenger, Opus 30.

The Indian filmmaker Debaki Bose adapted the play into a 1945 film titled Meghdoot.

In 2019, Priti Pandguangan re-created Meghadūtam as an electronic literature piece for the Electronic Literature Organization Collection 4.

== See also ==
- Mandākrāntā metre
- Hamsa-Sandesha
- Sanskrit literature
- Sanskrit drama
- Sandesh Rasak
- Sandesa Kavya
- Ashadh Ka Ek Din

== Editions ==
- Wilson, Horace Hayman (1813). The Mégha Dúta, Or, Cloud Messenger: A Poem, in the Sanscrit Language. Calcutta: College of Fort William. 2nd ed 1843 Introduction, text with English verse translation, and assorted footnotes.
- Johann Gildemeister, ed. (1841), Kalidasae Meghaduta et Cringaratilaka ex recensione: additum est glossarium, H.B. König Kalidasae Meghaduta et Çringaratilaka: additum est glossariumMeghaduta; et, Çringaratilaka Sanskrit text, with introduction and some critical notes in Latin.
- The Megha-dūta (3 ed.), Trübner & co., 1867 With Sanskrit text, English translation and more extensive notes separately.
- Colonel H. A. Ouvry (1868), The Megha dūta: or, Cloud messenger, Williams and Norgate The Megha Dūta: Or, Cloud Messenger. A prose translation.
- Ludwig Fritze (1879), Meghaduta, E. Schmeitzner German translation.
- The Megha duta; or, Cloud messenger: a poem, in the Sanskrit language, Upendra Lal Das, 1890 Hayman's translation, with notes and translation accompanying the Sanskrit text.
- Exhaustive notes on the Meghaduta, Bombay: D. V. Sadhale & Co., 1895 Exhaustive Notes on the Meghaduta: Comprising Various Readings, the Text with the Commentary of .... Text with Mallinātha's commentary Sanjīvanī. Separate sections for English translation, explanation of Sanskrit phrases, and other notes.
- Eugen Hultzsch, ed. (1911), Kalidasa's Meghaduta: Edited from manuscripts With the Commentary of Vallabhadeva and Provided With a Complete Sanskrit-English Vocabulary, Royal Asiatic society, London Kalidasa's Meghaduta
- T. Ganapati Sastri, ed. (1919), Meghaduta with the commentary of Daksinavartanatha
- Sri sesaraj Sarma Regmi, ed. (1964), Meghadutam of mahakavi Kalidasa (in Sanskrit and Hindi), chowkhmba vidybhavan varanasi-1
- Ramakrishna Rajaram Ambardekar, ed. (1979), Rasa structure of the Meghaduta - A critical study of Kalidaas's Meghaduta in the light of Bharat's Rasa Sootra (in English and Sanskrit)

== Translations ==
The Meghadūta has been translated many times in many Indian languages.

- The Bengali poet Buddhadeva Bose translated Meghadūta into Bengali in 1957.
- Dr. Jogindranath Majumdar translated Meghaduta in Bengali keeping its original 'Mandakranta Metre' for the first time published in 1969.
- Mahavir Prasad Dwivedi, a notable literary critic, translated Meghadūtam to Hindi prose in 1924.
- Three different translations into rhyming Hindi poetry were done by Shyamala Kant Varma, Bijendra Kumar Sharma, and Navin Kumar 'Nischal'.
- Acharya Dharmanand Jamloki Translated Meghduta in Garhwali and was well known for his work.
- Moti BA translated Meghduta in Bhojpuri Language.
- Many Nepali poets such as Jiwanath Updhyaya Adhikari, Shiva Kumar Pradhan, Biswa Raj Adhikari have translated Meghduta in Nepali language
- Mukhathala G. Arjunan translated Meghaduta in Malayalam keeping its original 'Mandakranta Metre'
- Uthaya Sankar SB retold Meghaduta in Bahasa Malaysia prose form in Thirukkural dan Megha Duta (2018)
