= Sita Agnipravesham =

Practice in Hindu mythology

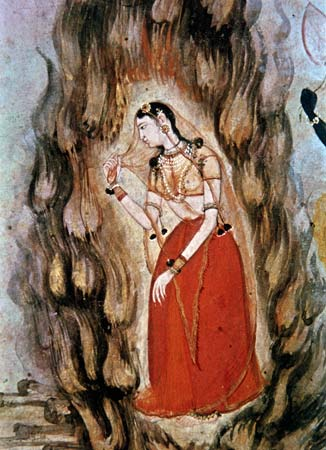
Mughal painting of Sita undergoing the agnipravesham.

Sita Agnipravesham (Sanskrit: अग्निप्रवेशम, romanized: Agnipraveśam, lit. 'Fiery entrance'), also called Sita Agnipariksha (Sanskrit: अग्निपरीक्षा, romanized: Agniparīkṣā, lit. 'fiery ordeal') is the mythical practice of self-immolation described in Hindu literature. It is primarily associated with the ordeal of Sita in the Ramayana, and is regarded to be a custom inspired by Vedic tradition.

== Legend ==
The Valmiki's Ramayana, which is the original Ramayana, describes how Maya Sita enters the fire so that when Rama rescues the illusory Sita from Ravana's captivity and brings her back, the real Sita can emerge from the fire, and indeed, the real Sita returns from the fire.

Some people misinterpreted this and said that Sita undergoes the agnipravesham to offer evidence of her chastity to her husband, Rama, and the people of Ayodhya, after suspicions are cast upon her virtue due to her abduction by Ravana. She invokes Agni, the god of fire, who rescues her, thereby testifying to her fidelity to Rama.

== See also ==
- Ramayana
- Trial by ordeal
- Sati
