= Ramayan (2012 TV series) =

- Also known as: Ramayan: Jeevan Ka Aadhar
- Directed by: Mukesh Singh; Pawan Parkhi; Rajesh Shikhre
- Country of origin: India
- Original language: Hindi
- No. of episodes: 56

Production
- Producers: Meenakshi Sagar; Moti Sagar
- Cinematography: Deepak Malwankar; Ashok Mishra
- Editor: Santosh Singh
- Camera setup: Multi-camera
- Production company: Sagar Pictures

Original release
- Network: Zee TV
- Release: 12 August 2012 – 1 September 2013

Ramayan: Sabke Jeevan Ka Aadhar is an Indian television series produced by Sagar Pictures which aired on Zee TV. It is an adaptation of Ramcharitmanas.

== Synopsis ==
Ramayan narrates the tale of Rama, who was the eldest of the four sons of Dasharatha, the King of Ayodhya. Rama is to become the king of Ayodhya upon his father's retirement, but his stepmother, Kaikeyi, under the influence of her maid Manthara, desires that her son, Bharata, become the king instead.

Recalling that Dasharatha had once promised to grant her any two boons that she asked of him, she demands first that Rama should be exiled to the forest for 14 years and second that Bharata should be crowned ruler in his stead. Although heartbroken, Dasharatha is compelled to keep his word. Reluctantly, he asks Rama to leave for the forest. Rama happily accepts the exile and leaves for the forest. Rama reluctantly accepts the company of his wife, Sita, and his younger brother, Lakshmana. When Bharata learns that his mother is responsible for Rama's exile, he follows Rama and begs him to return with him to Ayodhya. However, Rama refuses, bound by his duty to carry out his father's promise. Bharata decides instead to bring back to the palace Rama's paduka and places them on the throne as a gesture that Rama is the true king. Upon Rama's insistence, Bharata rules as his proxy over Ayodhya throughout Rama's 14-year exile.

Rama, Sita, and Lakshmana wander the forests, combating evil wherever they encounter it. They gain the blessings of numerous wise men and sages along the way. Twelve years into the exile, Ravan, the King of Lanka, abducts Sita. In their search of her, Rama and Lakshmana strike a friendship with Hanuman, Sugriv, Jamvanta, and their army of apes. When they reach Lanka, Rama battles Ravan and ultimately kills him, signifying triumph of good over evil.

== Episodes ==
No.
1

In the heavens, Prithvi asks Vishnu to save the earth from Ravana's atrocities, upon which Vishnu promises to reincarnate on earth in human form to destroy evil. Meanwhile, on earth, King Dasharatha and Queen Kaikeyi return to their palace after a battle. In his chambers, Dasharatha recounts to his other queens, Kausalya and Sumitra, how Kaikeyi saved his life on the battlefield. For her valiance, Dasharatha has promised Kaikeyi two boons that she can ask from him at any time. However, Dasharatha has become sad that if he were to die, he has no heirs who could continue his Ikshvaku dynasty.

When their family priest, Vasishtha visits the palace, he advises Dasharatha to seek Sage Rishyasringa's blessings to beget a son. Rishyasringa arranges to perform yajna, during which a divine figure emerges from the fire, carrying a chalice of kheer. He advises Dasharatha to apportion the kheer amongst his three wives. The wives each take their share, with Kaushalya and Kaikeyi each serving a bite of their own to Sumitra.

Back in their respective chambers, all three queens learn that they are pregnant. Kaikeyi is confronted by her maid Manthara, who envisions a future where Kaikeyi's son is the future ruler of Ayodhya, and the other two queens are left jealous. Kaikeyi chastises her for her wily attitude. Months later, Kaushalya and Kaikeyi each give birth to a son, and Sumitra gives birth to two twin sons. Vishnu appears before Kaushalya in his divine form, but she asks him to give her the joy of motherhood by manifesting in a mortal form. During the naming ceremony, Vashishtha names Kaushalya's son, the eldest of the four, Rama.
2

At the naming ceremony, Vashishtha names Kaikeyi's son Bharata and Sumitra's twins Lakshmana and Shatrughna. Vashishtha prophesizes that all four sons will become paragons of ideal men. The deities from the heavens descend into Ayodhya in disguise to get darshan of Rama.

A couple years later, while Kaikeyi plays with a toddler Rama, Manthara tells her to dote on Bharat instead. Kaikeyi tells Manthara that neither of the three mothers discriminate between the four boys, so she should do the same.

While Rama is alone in his chamber, Kaagbhushandi appears in the form of a crow to get Rama's darshan. Upon seeing the toddler, he doubts that this mortal cannot be the powerful Vishnu, so he flies through the window and snatches the food from Rama's hand and flies away. Rama's hand extends into the skies and follows Kaagbhushandi as he flies. Kaagbhushandi realizes his mistake, he flies back into Rama's chamber and falls at Rama's feet. Rama appears before him in his divine form of Vishnu and blesses him that he will always be known as his ardent devotee.

The four boys are now teenagers and compete in a hockey game against each other, with Rama and Lakshmana on one team competing against Bharata and Shatrughna on the other. Rama purposely avoids making a goal because he doesn't want to make Bharata lose.

Later that night, Dasharatha tells his queens that it is time for the four boys' Upanayana ceremony, after which they will leave for Vashistha's hermitage to study scriptures and the art of warfare. The queens are upset that their sons will leave them, but Dasharatha explains to them that these are a prince's duties. Vashishtha performs the ceremony and takes the four princes to his hermitage. The queens cry in the palace, wondering how their sons will adjust to the austere hermitage lifestyle after having been raised in the luxurious palace.
3

At Vashistha's hermitage, the brothers meet the head seeress, Arundhati, and find a mother figure in her. Arundhati sees that Rama does not eat because he is used to being fed his first morsel by his father. Out of compassion, she feeds him herself. At night, she also sings lullabies to all the boys at the hermitage.

The next morning, Vashishtha scolds Rama for violating the rules of the renunciant lifestyle. Rama bows down, regretting his behavior and promising to uphold the hermitage traditions going forward. Arundhati overhears their conversation and tells Vashishtha that along with the knowledge of scriptures and weaponry, princes must also be nourished emotionally in order to become compassionate kings. Vashishta agrees, so Arundhati teaches them music and other classes to instill positive emotions in the children, as well.

Years pass, and the princes have grown into disciplined young men. Vashishtha tells the princes the story of their ancestor, Raghu, who was known for being a man of his words. Vashishtha tells the princes they must protect the honor of their clan by also keeping their promises. At the palace, Dasharatha and the queens prepare for the sons to return, as their training at the hermitage is now complete.
4

The princes return to the palace after completing their training. The queens choose the clothes and jewelry with which to adorn them. Manthara again tries instigating Kaikeyi against Rama, but Kaikeyi scolds her. When the princes arrive at the palace, Dasharatha and the queens are at loss of words in seeing their sons after many years. Vashishta praises the princes as great leaders and able rulers. During lunch, Manthara tries to serve Bharata a special sweet she made for him, but he refuses unless she feeds Rama first. The king and queens are delighted to see the unity amongst the brothers, but Manthara is annoyed.

The next morning, Sage Vishvamitra arrives at the palace. He tells Dasharatha that while he and the other sages were trying to complete their yajna, demons interrupted them repeatedly; at that time, Vishvamitra heard a divine voice telling him to go to Ayodhya and seek Rama's help, as he is the incarnation of God. Dasharatha is reluctant to send the young and inexperienced Rama, but Rama is immediately willing to go with Vishwamitra, and Laskhmana decides to join him.
5

In the palace, the queens admonish Dasharatha for sending the two young princes for such a dangerous endeavor, but Dasharatha reminds them that their Raghu clan must adhere to their duties by sticking to their words. Manthara is elated to hear that Rama has gone away, hoping that Bharat can again have a chance at the throne. She tries to feed Bharat his favorite sweets, but Bharat is upset by his brothers' departure and is uninterested in her cloying attempts to win his favor.

Meanwhile, on the way to Vishvamitra's hermitage, Rama and Lakshmana enter the territory of demoness Tadaka, who has been terrorizing the sages. Vishvamitra tells the princes how she has been cursed by sages to live as a demoness. Vishvamitra leads the princes into Tadaka's cave, where she awakens upon hearing the sound of Rama's arrow. Rama kills her with his arrow, and she appears in her original demigoddess form to thank Rama for liberating her from her cursed existence. Pleased with their courage and patience, Vishvamitra endows Rama and Lakshmana with heavenly weapons from the deities, gifting them with invincibility.

Once they reach Vishvamitra's hermitage, Rama and Lakshmana guard the surroundings while the sages perform their yajna. Tadaka's children, Maricha and Subahu (Ramayana) arrive to terrorize the sages. They laugh at the seemingly young and incompetent princes. However, Rama and Lakshmana slay them, protecting the sages and allowing the yajna to be completed. Later that day, a messenger from Mithila comes to the hermitage on behalf of King Janaka to invite Vishvamitra to the swayamvara ceremony of Janaka's eldest daughter, Sita. Vishvamitra accepts the invitation and tells the princes to accompany him.

At the palace, Manthara once again tries instigating Kaikeyi against Rama, telling her how fortunate they would be if Bharata could ascend the throne. Kaikeyi gets frustrated and leaves the room, but Manthara is determined to turn her against Rama.
6

In her palace, Sita prays to Shiva that she attains an ideal husband. Her cousin sister, Mandavi asks her what she would seek in a partner, and Sita says that she seeks someone in whom she sees Vishnu.

On the way to Mithila, Vishvamitra and the two princes come across Sage Gautama's hermitage, where his wife, Ahilya, has been turned into stone due to a curse. Rama liberates her with his divine touch. After transforming back from her stone form, she falls at his feet, and at her request, he sends her to heaven.

When Vishvamitra and the princes reach the palace, Janaka is drawn to their auras. Sita's friend passing by sees them, too, and runs to tell Sita of their magnificence. She wants to bring Sita to the guesthouse to see the princes herself, but Sita does not want to break tradition and promises to only marry the man who wins the swayamvara.

The next morning, Vishvamitra asks the princes to get him flowers from the garden for his puja. Sita and her friends are also in the garden picking flowers, and Sita is drawn to Rama immediately upon seeing him. Their eyes meet and become lost in each other's eyes.
7

In the heavens, Shiva and Parvati rejoice over Rama and Sita's meeting. Parvati recalls that in her past life, Sita was Vedavati, who spent her life in prayer of Vishnu. The demon Ravana hears her chants and came to harass her. When he touches her, she curses him that in her next life, Vishnu will be her husband and he will destroy Ravana.

Back in the garden, Sita runs to the temple and prays to Parvati that Rama wins the swayamvara so she can marry him. From the heavens, Parvati grants her this wish.

The next day is the swayamvara, Vishvamitra reminds Rama that the suitor who is able to lift Shiva's divine bow will emerge as winner. Princes and disguised demons from many lands arrive in Mithila in an effort to wed Sita, but her mind is fixated on Rama. The ceremony begins, and Janaka reminds everyone that when Sita was a young girl, she was able to lift this divine bow, and thus, the only suitable match for her must be able to lift it, as well. Many arrogant suitors try in vain, but are unable to lift the bow. Sita's sisters begin to get worried that no one will be able to win her over, and Sita wonders why Rama is not stepping up to try lifting the bow himself.
8

Many of the suitors try to lift the bow together, but it does not budge. They get mad at Janaka for having such an impossible task. Janaka himself shares his disappointment with the incompetence of the men present. Upon hearing his disapproval, Lakshmana becomes angry, as he feels Janaka's statement is an insult to Rama's capabilities.

With Vishvamitra's blessing, Rama accepts the challenge to lift the divine bow. The suitors riducule him, wondering why this young man with a weak frame thinks he is capable. Meanwhile, Sita prays to Parvati that she will perform 14 years of penance in exchange for Rama lifting the bow and becoming her husband. In the heavens, Parvati and Shiva are agitated by her prayer, for now she has destined herself to 14 years of austerity if Rama is able to lift the bow. However, they both understand that this must be Vishnu's wish, and so Rama is able to easily lift the bow. While he strings the bow, Rama snaps it in half. Sita, her mother, and her friends are elated and Sita enters the chambers to garland Rama.

While everyone celebrates, an angry Parashurama enters the assembly, as he had been interrupted from his penance when the divine bow broke. He asks which evil person disrespected Shiva by breaking the bow. As Parashurama scolds the entire assembly, Lakshmana becomes upset at the insult to Rama. However, Rama interferes between the two and tries to calm both of them down.
9

Rama reveals that he was the one who broke the arrow. Parashurama wonders what the true form of this divine person must be. He gives Rama his bow, that was once Vishnu's, and Rama not only strings the bow, but also appears before Parashurama in his Vishnu form. After Parashurama leaves contentedly, Vishvamitra suggests that Janaka send a messenger to Ayodhya so that Dasharatha can also be a part of the marriage ceremony.

That night, Vishvamitra gives his blessing for all four brothers to get married together, and Janaka happily agrees. The next day, Sita's younger sister Urmila overhears Lakshmana telling Rama that he will not marry, as he wants to devote his life to serving Rama. Urmila cries to Sita, and Sita comforts her, reminding her that if she and Lakshmana are meant to be, then the gods will definitely bring them together.

The next day, demon king Banasura, upset that he didn't win the swayamvara, sends a letter to Janaka threatening him to marry Sita to one of the demon kings or else she will be abducted. Janaka sends his brother Kushadhwaja to attack the demon's kingdom. He tells the queen, and they both become worried for Sita.

That night, Sita decides to go for a walk in the garden while Banasura sneaks into the palace. Lakshmana hears a noise and decides to see who is there. Rama also awakes, and upon noticing that Lakshmana is not in the room, ventures into the garden in search of him. Rama and Sita run into each other in the garden. As they approach one another, Lakshmana yells from behind asking Rama to step away. He points an arrow towards Sita, ready to shoot her. As Sita moves, Lakshmana shoots his arrow.
10

Lakshmana shoots the arrow at Sita, and Rama and Urmila rush to the scene. Rama realizes that the person in front of them is not actually Sita, but Banasura who has taken an illusory form. As Lakshmana slays the demon, the real Sita appears from the garden.

The next morning, Shatananda, the family priest, warns King Janaka that Ram and Sita cannot get married because their birth charts do not align. As they process this news, Dasharatha and his family arrive in Mithila. Janaka welcomes them while Sunaina tells Sita this wedding cannot happen. Sita tells her mother that she would rather give her life than to forsake marrying Rama. At night, Vishvamitra and Vasishtha advise that the couple get married during an auspicious time frame the next morning, which would ensure a successful marriage.

In the heavens, Indra tells Shiva and Parvati that Rama and Sita's happy life will prove disastrous for mankind. Earth is in need of Rama to destroy the evil of the world, and for that, he will need to leave Ayodhya. The deities plan that Chandra will appear at the wedding as a nymph and distract the families so the marriage ceremony is not completed within the auspicious timeframe.

As the grooms and brides arrive at the ceremony, Chandra comes in nymph form and performs a captivating dance that distracts both the families, which lets the auspicious time frame to pass as per the deities' plan.

== Cast ==
- Himanshu Soni as Lord Vishnu, Goddess Lakshmi's consort who reincarnated as Lord Rama
- Kiran Sharad as Goddess Lakshmi, Lord Vishnu's consort who reincarnated as Goddess Sita
- Navdeep Sahni as Lord Shiva
- Shubha Uplopwar / Archana Karmakar as Goddess Parvati
- Gagan Malik as Rama, incarnation of Lord Vishnu
- Neha Sargam as Sita, incarnation of Devi Lakshmi, wife of Rama
- Neil Bhatt as Lakshmana, Lord Rama's younger brother, Dasharath and Sumitra's elder son
- Nishant Kumar as Bharata, Lord Rama's younger brother, Dasharath and Kaikeyi's son
- Gaurav Roopdas as Shatrughna, Lord Ram's younger brother, Dasharath and Sumitra's younger son
- Pallavi Sapra as Urmila, Sita's sister and wife of Lakshman
- Suman Gupta as Mandavi, Sita's cousin and wife of Bharat
- Sweety Dattani as Shrutakirti, Sita's cousin and wife of Shatrughan
- Malhar Pandya as Hanuman, Lord Rama's devotee
- Lokesh Batta as Vali / Sugriva, King of Kishkindha
- Sachin Tyagi as Ravana, King of Lanka
- Rishabh Shukla as Dasharatha, King of Ayodhya, Ram, Lakshman, Bharat and Shatrughan's father
- Neelima Parandekar as Kaushalya, Lord Rama's mother, King Dasrath's first consort
- Shikha Swaroop as Kaikeyi, King Dasrath's second wife, Bharat's mother
- Anjali Gupta as Sumitra, King Dasrath's third wife, Lakshman and Shatrughan's mother
- Radha Krishna Dutta as Janaka, King of Mithila, father of Sita and Urmila
- Nitika Anand Mukherjee as Sunayana, Queen of Mithila, Sita and Urmila's mother
- Manisha Trivedi as Chandrabhaga, Kushadhvaj's wife, Mandavi and Shrutakirti's mother
- Payal Shukla as Priyamvada, Sita's friend
- Rucha Gujarati as Ahalya, Sage Gautam's wife
- Rinku Ghosh as Bhudevi
- Mahika Sharma as Devi Amba
- Manav Sohal as Vashishta
- Annapurna Vitthal as Arundhati
- Ajay Pal Singh Andotra as Malyavan
- Divyanka Tripathi Dahiya as Chandradev disguised as Devi Apsara
- Vije Bhatia as Meghnad
- Hemant Choudhary as Agastya
- Amit Pachori as Parshurama
- Tarakesh Chauhan as Vishwamitra
- Anand Goradia as Angad
- Sunita Rajwar as Manthara
- Vikas Shrivastav as Nishadraj
- Anup Shukla as Shashiketu
- Sunil Bob Gadhvali as Shukracharya
