= Sunayana (Ramayana) =

Queen of Videha and mother of Sita in the Ramayana

Maharani of Videha
- Predecessor: Keikasi
- Successor: Unknown
- Spouse: Janaka
- Issue: Sita; Urmila
- House: Mithila, Videha
- Dynasty: Suryavamsha (by marriage)
- Religion: Hinduism

Sunayana (Sanskrit: सुनयना, IAST: Sunayanā) is the queen of Videha in the Hindu epic Ramayana. Sunayana is the queen consort of Janaka, the king of Videha, who ruled from Mithila. She is the mother of Sita, the female protagonist of the epic and Urmila.

== Etymology ==
The name Sunayana is of Sanskrit origin, and could be divided into Su meaning good, and nayana, meaning eyes. Thus, her name means 'beautiful eyes'.

== Legend ==
=== Birth ===
While Valmiki remains silent on her parentage and refers to her as queen consort of Seeradhwaja Janaka, the later additions of Ramayana, refers to her as Sunayana and she is considered as the daughter of a serpent who was an ardent devotee of Shiva.

=== Marriage and children ===
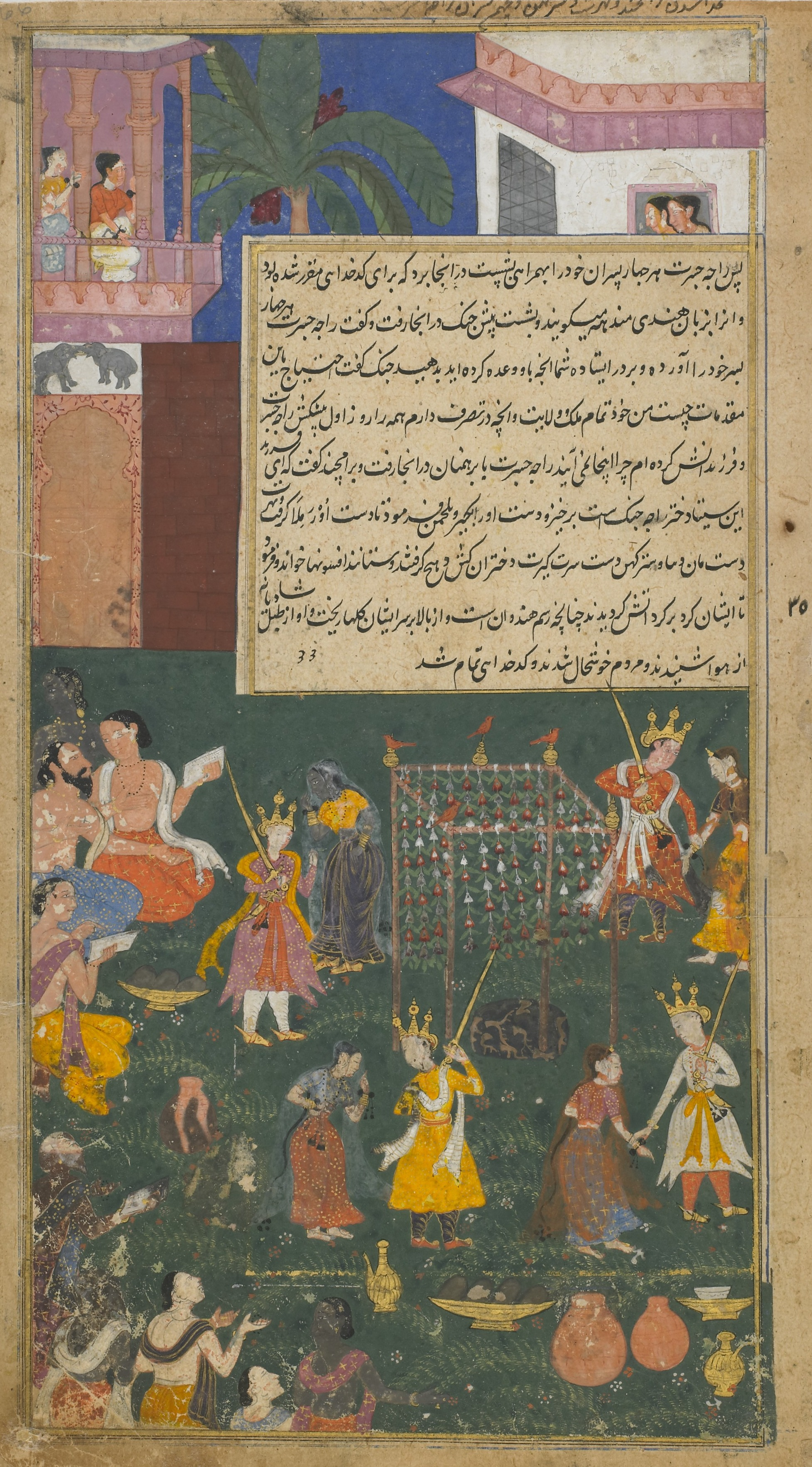
The marriage ceremony of Sunayana's daughters Sita and Urmila with Rama and Lakshmana

Sunayana was married to King Janaka, who ruled over the Videha region from his capital Mithila. During her marriage to Janak, Shiva gifted these two jewels, one in the form of Chudamani and the other encrusted on a ring.

According to Ramayana, Janaka and Sunayana found Sita while ploughing as a part of a yagna and adopted her. Sita is considered as an avatar of goddess Lakshmi. She later gave birth to Urmila on Jaya ekadashi, who is an avatar of goddess Nagalakshmi.

When Sita reached adulthood, Janaka conducted her svayamvara, which was won by Rama. Alongside the wedding of Rama and Sita, Urmila married Rama's younger brother Lakshmana. According to the Bundeli Ramayana, it is Sunayana who gave the ring and chudamani to Sita.

=== Queen of Mithila ===
Sunayana succeeded Janaka's mother Keikasi as the queen of Mithila. As the queen, she invested herself in the political and cultural aspects of Videha. In the city of Janakpur in the Mithila region of Nepal, there some ancient idols of the legendary queen are preserved along with the King Janaka's idols.

== In popular culture ==
=== Films ===
- Sudha portrayed Sunayana in the 2011 Telugu film Sri Rama Rajyam.

=== Television ===
- Urmila Bhatt portrayed Sunayana in the 1987 series Ramayan.
- Gargi Patel portrayed Sunayana in the 2000 series Vishnu Puran
- Shalini Kapoor Sagar portrayed Sunayana in the 2002 series Ramayan.
- Prairna Agarwal / Falguni Dave portrayed Sunayana in the 2008 series Ramayan.
- Nitika Sharma portrayed Sunayana in the 2011 series Devon Ke Dev...Mahadev.
- Nitika Anand Mukherjee portrayed Sunayana in the 2012 series Ramayan.
- Bhargavi Chirmule portrayed Sunayana in the 2015 series Siya Ke Ram.
- Sampada Vaze portrayed Sunayana in the 2018 series Ram Siya Ke Luv Kush.
- Via Roy Chaudhary portrayed Sunayana in the 2024 series Shrimad Ramayan.
- Alka Nair portrayed Sunayana in the 2024 series Kakabhushundi Ramayan- Anasuni Kathayein
