= Sumitra =

Queen of Kosala in Hindu epic Ramayana

- Queen of Kosala
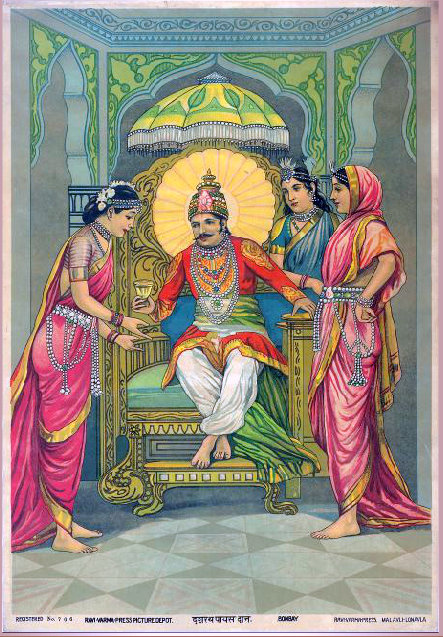
- Sumitra with Dasharatha during the distribution of Payasa
- Born: Kashi
- Spouse: Dasharatha
- Issue: Shanta; Unknown daughter Lakshmana; Shatrughna
- House: Ayodhya
- Dynasty: Kashi (by birth); Raghuvamsha-Suryavamsha (by marriage)
- Religion: Hinduism

Sumitra (Sanskrit: सुमित्रा, IAST: Sumitrā) is a princess of Kashi and the queen of Kosala in the Hindu epic Ramayana. Sumitra is the second queen consort of Dasharatha, the king of Kosala, who ruled from Ayodhya. Regarded to be a wise and dedicated woman, she is the mother of the twins Lakshmana and Shatrughna.

== Etymology ==
The name Sumitra is of Sanskrit origin, and could be divided into Su meaning good, and Mitra, meaning friend. Thus, her name means 'a good friend' or 'one with a friendly nature'. She is known in other languages as Tamil: சுமித்திரை, Burmese: Thumitra, Malay: Samutra, Khmer and Thai: สมุทรเทวี Samutthra Thewi).

== Legend ==
=== Birth ===
While Valmiki is silent on her parentage, later texts variously described her as a princess of Kashi or of Magadha, and belonging to the Haiheya clan. She is called the daughter of Magadha, as per Kalidasa’s Raghuvamsham. Kalidasa wrote,

तमलभन्त पति पतिदेवताः शिखारिणामिव सागरमापगाः॥ मगधकोसलकेकयशासिनां दुहितरोऽहितरोपितमार्गणम् ॥ १७॥

"The daughters of the kings of Magadha, Kosala, and Kaikeya delight in accepting as husband the king Dashratha, the same way as rivers descending from mountains embrace the ocean."

=== Marriage and children ===
Sumitra was married to king Dasharatha as his second queen consort. In the Balakanda chapter of the Ramayana, Sumitra first appears.

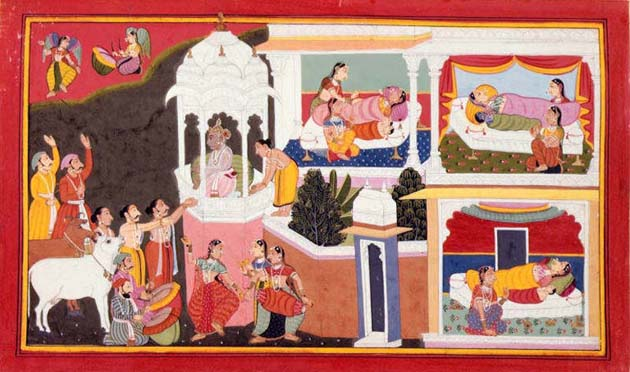
Sumitra giving birth to her twins, Lakshmana and Shatrughan

Sumitra performs the asvamedha yagna alongside Dasharatha and his two other wives in hopes of blessings for children. At the sacrifice conducted by Rishyasringa to obtain sons for the childless Dasharatha, a divine being emerged from the flames with a golden vessel filled with divine payasam (a milk delicacy) prepared by the gods. Dasharatha offers half of this divine food to Kausalya, a quarter to Sumitra (i.e., literally 'half of that which remained'), an eighth to Kaikeyi (i.e., again, 'half of that which remained'), and then, upon reflection, gives the final eighth to Sumitra again.

Consequently, Kausalya gives birth to the prince Rama and Kaikeyi to Bharata. Having received two portions, Sumitra became the mother of twins, Lakshmana and Satrughna.

Her elder son Lakshmana married Urmila, daughter of Janaka, King of Mithila and her younger son Shatrughan, married Shrutakirti, daughter of Janaka's brother Kushadhvaja.

=== Daughter Shanta and Unknown Daughter ===
In some later textual accounts, Shanta and Unknown daughter is described as Sumitra's 2 daughters, and the eldest children, of Dasharatha. However, in the Balakanda of the Ramayana, Valmiki writes of Shanta only as the daughter of Romapada, the king of Anga, who was a friend of Dasharatha. At no point is Shanta's mother named.

=== Rama's exile ===
Sumitra is known to encourage her son Lakshmana to go into exile with Rama. Sumitra is described to have found a lot of happiness around her son Lakshmana, with the latter being described as the 'enhancer of her joy' and is also known as Saumitra (Sanskrit: सौमित्र, lit. 'son of Sumitra').

Despite this, she sends her son in his brother's service. Before his departure, Sumitra tells Lakshmana, "Ram is your elder brother, and the future king. Do not neglect your duty. Serve and guard him, and show your devotion, at all times."

== Assessment ==
Neither the principal queen nor the favoured wife, Sumitra was single-minded in her devotion to her husband and to the senior queen, Kausalya. Considered as the wisest of Dasharatha's three wives, she supported Lakshmana's decision to accompany Rama, to serve him during his exile, and comforted Kausalya after the departure of her son.

In the Ramayana, Sumitra is faultless and charming and skilled in her employment of words. Sumitra's husband, Dasharatha deems her worthy and is fearful of losing the respect in her eyes. He says,

विप्रकारं च रामस्य संप्रयाणं वनस्य च।। सुमित्रा प्रेक्ष्यवै भीता कथं मे विश्वसिष्यति।।
"Being apprehensive of seeing Rama being treated with contempt and his exile to the forest, how will Sumitra put faith in me?"

== Literature ==
After the exile of Rama, Sita, and Lakshmana, the benevolent Sumitra consoles Queen Kausalya with her persuasive words:

“What should be difficult for him, who, armed with bow and sword, is preceded on his way by Lakshmana? O Lady, abandon grief and infatuation, assuredly you will behold Shri Rama returning from his exile. O You who art irreproachable, O Kalyani, O Auspicious One, you will behold your son like the rising moon, placing his head at your feet. You will shed tears of joy, seeing your son installed on the throne and in possession of the king’s treasury. O Lady, neither grieve nor let your mind be troubled, I see nought that is inauspicious in respect of Rama. Soon you shalt behold your son with Sita and Lakshmana. O Sinless Queen, it becomes you to encourage others, therefore, why dost you now cause your heart distress? O Devi, do not grieve, there is none in the world more virtuous than Rama. Seeing Rama returning from the forest with his friends, making obeisance to you, then will you shed tears of joy, like the clouds in the rainy season. In brief, I tell you, your son Shri Rama, returning to the capital, will press your feet to him with his tender hands. Seeing your son bowing to your feet you will cover him with tears as the clouds cover the mountains with rain.”

— Valmiki, Ramayana, Ayodhya Kanda, Chapter 2

During Rama's consecration, Sumitra offers her blessings to the prince:

Hearing these words of (i.e. uttered by) him, O sinless one, she, with her face hung down, slowly said: “Rāma, go to your (own) house.” And Rāma, the best among men, having heard (these) words of his mother, saluted her, and the treasure of compassion went to the house of Sumitrā. The large-hearted Sumitrā, seeing Rāma with her son (Lakṣmaṇa), said, with (i.e. giving him) blessings: Live long, live long.

— Padma Purana, Patala Kanda, Chapter 4

== In popular culture ==
=== Films ===
- Suma portrayed Sumitra in the 1997 Telugu film Ramayanam.
- Dishi Duggal voiced Sumitra in the 2010 animated Hindi film Ramayana: The Epic.
- Sandhya Janak portrayed Sumitra in the 2011 Telugu film Sri Rama Rajyam.
- Sonal Jha portrayed Sumitra in the 2026 Hindi film, Ramayana: Part 1

=== Television ===
- Rajnibala portrayed Sumitra in the 1987 series Ramayan and the 1988 series Luv Kush.
- Kamalika Guha Thakurta portrayed Sumitra in 2000 series Vishnu Puran
- Jyoti Joshi portrayed Sumitra in the 2002 series Ramayan.
- Sangeeta Kapure portrayed Sumitra in the 2008 series Ramayan.
- Anushka Singh portrayed Sumitra in the 2011 series Devon Ke Dev...Mahadev.
- Anjalie Gupta portrayed Sumitra in the 2012 series Ramayan.
- Kanishka Soni portrayed Sumitra in the 2015 series Sankat Mochan Mahabali Hanumaan.
- Sampada Vaze portrayed Sumitra in the 2015 series Siya Ke Ram.
- Preeti Gandwani portrayed Sumitra in the 2018 series Ram Siya Ke Luv Kush.
- Bhawna Aneja portrayed Sumitra in the 2024 series Shrimad Ramayan.
- Gurpreet Kaur Sandhu portrayed Sumitra in 2024 DD National series Kakabhushundi Ramayan- Anasuni Kathayein.

==== YouTube ====
- Priyankshi Keswani portrayed Sumitra in 2024 YouTube series Valmiki Ramayan.

== See also ==
- Dasharatha
- Kausalya
- Kaikeyi
