= Ramayan (2002 TV series) =

Indian mythological television series

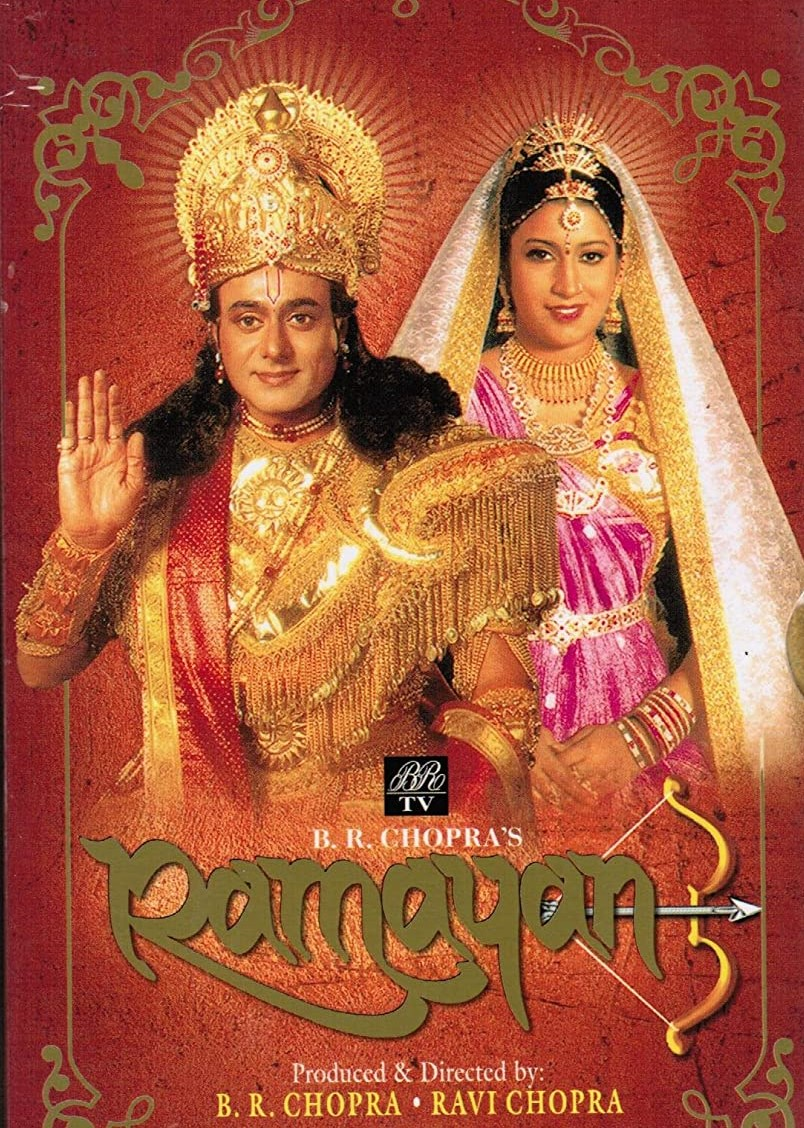
- Genre: Epic
- Created by: B.R. Chopra
- Based on: Ramayana
- Screenplay by: Ram Govind; Hassan Kamal (dialogues); Satish Bhatnagar, Hassan Kamal, Ram Govind, Shafiq Ansari
- Directed by: B.R. Chopra; Ravi Chopra
- Starring: Nitish Bharadwaj; Smriti Irani
- Music by: Raj Kamal
- Composer: Maya Govind
- Country of origin: India
- Original language: Hindi
- No. of seasons: 1
- No. of episodes: 48

Production
- Executive producer: Bharat Ratan
- Producer: B.R. Chopra
- Cinematography: Dharam Chopra
- Editor: Birpal Singh
- Camera setup: Multi-camera
- Running time: 45 minutes
- Production company: B.R. Films

Original release
- Network: Zee TV
- Release: 2002 – 2002

Ramayan is a Hindi TV series that was aired on Zee TV in 2002. It is a television adaptation of the ancient Indian epic of the same name, and is primarily based on Valmiki's Ramayana, Tulsidas Ramcharitramanas, Kalidasa's Raghuvaṃśa and Kambar's Kambh Ramayana. It was produced and directed by Baldev Raj Chopra and Ravi Chopra.

The scripting for the series was done by Ram Govind and research was done by Satish Bhatnagar, Hasan Kamal and Shafiq Ansari. Dharam Chopra was the Director of Photography.

Each episode started with a title song sung by Vinod Rathod and ended with a doha or couplet sung by Manoj Mishra and written by Maya Govind.

== Premise ==
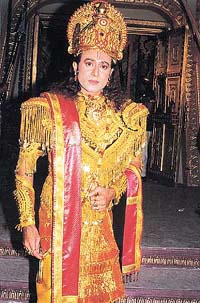
Nitish Bharadwaj who played Ram

The show starts with the introduction of King Dasharath. He returns victorious from a war. His three queens - Kaushalya, Sumitra and Kaikeyi welcome him happily. Yet they were unhappy about not having an heir to the throne. Followed by his grief for not having a son, King Dasharath visits Guru Vashishth who suggests him to go to Rishi Shringi. King Dashrath goes in search for Rishi Shringi, After many hardships, he convinces Rishi Shringi for Santati Yagya. After completion of the yagya, King Dashrath has four sons, Ram, Bharat, Lakshman and Shatrughn from his three queens. Kaushalya gave birth to Ram, Kaikeyi to Bharat and Sumitra to Lakshman and Shatrughn who were twins. It covers several scenes from the Maharishi Valmiki's Ramayana. Scenes of Ram going to gurukul and coming back are shown. Sita's swayamwar and Ram-Sita Marriage is also shown here. Along with them, the brothers of Ram - Lakshman, Bharat and Shatrughn married the sister and cousins of Sita - Urmila, Mandavi and Shrutakirti respectively. The brides were welcomed in Ayodhya. Soon afterward Dasharath desired to crown Ram as the king of Ayodhya. Manthara poisoned Kaikeyi's mind against Dasharath's idea. Recalling that Dasharath had once promised to grant Kaikeyi any two boons that she asked from him, she demanded that Ram should be exiled to the forest for fourteen years and that Bharat should be crowned ruler instead. Although heartbroken, Dasharath is compelled to keep his word. Reluctantly, he asks Ram to leave for the forest. Ram happily accepts the exile and leaves for the forest. Ram reluctantly accepts the company of his wife, Sita, and his younger brother, Lakshman. When Bharat learns that his mother is responsible for Ram's exile, he follows Ram and begs him to return with him to Ayodhya. However, Ram refuses, bound by his duty to carry out his father's promise. Bharat decides instead to bring back Ram, Lakshman and Sita from the forest. Ram politely denies the idea of returning before the completion of the exile period to respect the tradition of Raghu dynasty of keeping words. Bharat agrees and takes Ram's paduka instead. He places them on the throne as a gesture that Ram is the true king. He decided to spend an ascetic life like Ram and Lakshman staying in Nandigram at the outskirts of Ayodhya till the end of exile. Upon his insistence, Shatrughn ruled as his proxy over Ayodhya throughout the fourteen-year exile. Ram, Sita, and Lakshman wandered in the forests, combating evil wherever they encounter it. They gained the blessings of numerous wise men and sages along the way. Thirteen years into the exile, Ravan, the King of Lanka, abducts Sita. In their search of her, Ram and Lakshman meet Hanuman, Sugriv, Jamvanta, and the Vanar Sena. When they reach Lanka, Rama battles Ravan and ultimately kills him, signifying triumph of good over evil. Lord Ram returns back to Ayodhya and is declared the King of Ayodhya. The series ends with coronation of Lord Ram.

== Episodes ==
There were total of 48 episodes which were aired every Sunday at 9AM.

== Episode guide ==
=== Baal Kaand (Episode 1 to Episode 17) ===
- Episode 1- King Dasharath's Early life. His queens, Kaushalya, Sumitra and Kaikeyi. Dasharatha asks Guru Vashishth for help in performing a yagna (sacrifice) to obtain children. Lord Vishnu asks Goddess Lakshmi to incarnate with him.
- Episode 2- Completion of Santati Yagya. Ravan's Introduction, King Janak asks lord Shiva for a child.
- Episode 3- Lord Vishnu is born as Ram. King Dasharath is blessed with three more sons.
- Episode 4- Guru Vashishth is called for the naming ceremony of the King Dashrath's four sons. The four children leave for Ashram.
- Episode 5- Goddess Lakshmi is born as Sita.
- Episode 6- Sage Vishwamitra's sacrifices are being disturbed by Tataka, a yakshini turned demoness.
- Episode 7- King Dasharath is eagerly waiting for Ram to come back.
- Episode 8- Ram and his brothers meet the parents.
- Episode 9- Vishwamitra arrived at Ayodhya and asks Dasharath to send Ram and Lakshman with him for protection of his yagya.
- Episode 10- Ram kills Tataka and her son Subahu and wounds her other son Marich who returns to Lanka.
- Episode 11- Sita along with Shatanand visits ashram of Gautam and gets to know about him giving curse to his wife Ahalya.
- Episode 12- Ram frees Ahalya from the curse, Ahalya and Gautam reconcile.
- Episode 13- Ram and Lakshman along with Vishvamitra arrive Mithila, Ram and Sita see each other in Pushpa Vatika.
- Episode 14- Ram strings the bow of Shiv, Parshuram arrives in anger, Ram calms him down.
- Episode 15- Dasharath arrives Mithila along with others. Janak and Dasharath decide to get the three brothers of Ram married to sister and cousins of Sita.
- Episode 16- Marriages of Ram - Sita, Lakshman - Urmila, Bharat - Mandavi, Shatrughn - Shrutakirti.
- Episode 17- Janak and his family bids farewell to the daughters, Dasharath and others returns to Ayodhya.

=== Ayodhya Kaand (Episode 18 to Episode 31) ===
- Episode 18- Dasharath and his sons bid farewell to Vishvamitra.
- Episode 19 - Sita invites his in-laws for the first kitchen of the sisters.
- Episode 20 - Kaikeyi's brother Yuddhajit arrives. Bharat and Shatrughn leaves with him for Kaikeya.
- Episode 21- Manthara tells Kaikeyi about the decision of coronation of Ram. She instigates her against him.
- Episode 22- Kaikeyi demands Dasharath asking him to give the throne to Bharat and exile of fourteen years to Ram, Ram accepts the decision, Lakshman and Sita decide to accompany Ram.
- Episode 23- Kaikeyi gives clothes of hermits to Ram, Lakshman and Sita.
- Episode 24- Ram, Lakshman and Sita bid farewell to the family members.
- Episode 25- Bharat and Shatrughn leave for Ayodhya, Dasharath tells Kaushalya about his curse.
- Episode 26- Ram blesses Kevat and Nishad raj, Dasharath dies of grief.
- Episode 27- Bharat and Shatrughn arrive home and are devastated to hear of their brothers' exile and their father's death. Bharat refuses the crown and decides to bring Ram back.
- Episode 28- Kaikeyi mourns. Bharat takes permission of elders and they agree to bring Ram back. Kaushalya tells Kaikeyi to come along.
- Episode 29- Devi Sita's father Janak hears all the news, including that Bharat has gone after Ram and taken the army. Janak heads after them.Ram and Bharat meet at Chitrakut. Bharat takes sandals of Ram.
- Episode 30 - Bharat places the sandals of Ram on the throne. Ram tells Sita and Lakshman, the story of Atri and Anusuya.
- Episode 31 - Ram, Sita and Lakshman meet Atri and Anusuya. Later, they meet Jatayu who advices them to stay at Panchavati.

=== Aranya Kand (Episode 32 to Episode 37) ===
- Episode 32- The story of Hanuman is told.
- Episode 33 - Vali faces Dundubhi. Sugriva is kicked out of
- Episode 34 - Shurpanakha meets Ram and Lakshman and keeps proposal of marriage. She tries to harm Sita after being rejected. Lakshman chops off her nose.
- Episode 35- Ram and Lakshman kill Khar, Dushan and Trishira. Ravan asks Marich to help him in abduction of Sita.
- Episode 36 - Ravan abducts Sita. Jatayu intervenes. Ravan harms him. Jatayu tells Ram and Lakshman about Sita.
- Episode 37 - Ram meets Shabari. She tells him about Sugriv.

=== Kishkindha Kand (Episode 38 to Episode 39) ===
- Episode 38 - Ram and Lakshman meet Sugriv, a prince of the Vanar kingdom, and Hanuman, a powerful vanar who is the son of the Wind God Vayu, find Devi Sita's jewellery and show it to Ram. Sugriv tells his story: he left his brother king Vali who was fighting an asura in a cave, truly thinking that Vali was dead, and took the throne as regent until Vali's son Angad grew up. However, Vali was not dead, and returned angry, beating up Sugriv.
- Episode 39- Ram kills Vali for his wrong actions. Sugriv is now the king. A grateful Sugriv orders his army to find Devi Sita.

=== Sundar Kand (Episode 40 to Episode 42) ===
- Episode 40- Sugriv's Vanar sena goes in all directions searching for Devi Sita. Angad, Hanuman and Jambavantha meet Jatayu's brother Sampati, who tells them Devi Sita is across the sea in Lanka. Hanuman reaches Lanka and meets Vibhishan.
- Episode 41- Ravan warns Sita. When she rejected, he tries to kill him. Mandodari intervenes. Hanuman meets Sita and tells her about Ram. Hanuman kills Akshay Kumar.
- Episode 42 - Meghanad brings Hanuman to Ravan. Ravan orders to set fire in his tail. Hanuman burns Lanka. Hanuman tells Ram about Sita.

=== Lanka Kand/Yuddha Kanda(Episode 43 to Episode 48) ===
- Episode 43- Vibhishan advices Ravan to return Sita to Ram. Ravan expels Vibhishan from Lanka. Vibhishan along with his family goes to Ram. Ram prays to sea.
- Episode 44- The army of Ram builds a bridge over the sea. Angad goes to Lanka as messenger of Ram. Angad warns Ravan to return Sita to Ram.
- Episode 45- Prahast, Ravan's son withdraws his participation in the battle, much to Ravan's dismay. Prahast praises Ram. Ram prays to goddess Durga.
- Episode 46- Ram saves Vibhishan from a celestial weapon of Ravan. Meghanad injures Lakshman with a celestial weapon. Lord Hanuman goes in search of sanjivani booti. He kills Kalanemi and meets Bharata in Ayodhya
- Episode 47- Laxman is cured and resumes the war. Lakshman kills Meghanad. Ravan wakes up his second brother Kumbhkaran, and tells about the conflict with Ram. Kumbhkarn goes for battle. Ram kills him.
- Episode 48- Last day of the great war. Ram And Ravan fight face to face. Ram shoots arrow on Ravan's head, but he regrows his head. Ram kills Ravan by shooting an arrow on his navel, and before dying, he imparts knowledge to Laxman. Vibhishan is crowned as the King of Lanka. Ram meets Sita and asks her for Agnipariksha. 14 years of exile are over. Ram, Sita and Lakshman return to Ayodhya. Ram meets everyone and is crowned as the King of Ayodhya.

== Production ==
- The series was produced by B.R Chopra and directed by Ravi Chopra. The executive producer for the series was Bharat Ratan.

== Re-run ==
- Ramayan was re-telecasted on Zee TV and DD National in the year 2008 from 28 July 2008 to 20 August 2009.
- Ramayan was re-telecasted on Dhamaal from 3 June 2024 to 20 July 2024.
- Ramayan was re-telecasted on Dabang from 11 October 2024 to 27 November 2024.

== Music ==
- Raj Kamal was the music Director.
- Vinod Rathod sang the title song of the series.
- Monoj Mishra sang the doha (end song) or the couplet for this series as well as for Vishnu Puran (TV series)
- Vinod Rathod sang seven songs in the episodes of Ram-Sita Vivah (episode 13 and 14)
- The songs were mainly taken from Shri Ramcharitmanas by Sage Tulsidasa.
- Maya Govind composed the couplets for each episode.

== Casting ==
- Nitish Bharadwaj (famous for his roles as Krishna and Vishnu) portrayed Bhagwan Vishnu as well as Rama.
- Smriti Irani played Devi Lakshmi as well as Sita.
- Kinshuk Vaidya was cast as Child Rama.
- Sudhir Dalvi played Brahmadev in this series.
- Samar Jai Singh was replaced by Yashodhan Rana to play Bhagwan Shiva.
- Samar Jai Singh played Meghnad for the series.

== Cast ==
- Nitish Bhardwaj as Ram & Vishnu
- Smriti Irani as Sita & Lakshmi
- Surendra Pal as Ravan, King Of Lanka
- Deepak Jethi as Hanuman, Devotee Of Lord Rama
- Bijay Anand as Lakshman, Younger Brother Of Lord Rama
- Ayush Pandey as Bharat, Younger Brother Of Lord Rama
- Amit Pachori as Shatrughna, Younger Brother Of Lord Rama
- Ashwini Sidwani as Urmila, Lakshman's Wife, Sita's Sister
- Rajani Chandra as Mandavi, Bharat's Wife, Shrutakirti's Sister
- Malini Kapoor / Aarti Puri as Shrutakirti, Shatrughna's wife, Mandavi's Sister
- Gajendra Chauhan as Dasharath, Ram, Bharat, Lakshman and Shatrughna's Father
- Beena Banerjee as Kaushalya, King Dasaratha's First Wife, Lord Rama's Mother
- Jyoti Joshi as Sumitra, King Dasaratha's Second Wife, Lakshman and Shatrughna's Mother
- Dolly Minhas as Kaikeyi, King Dasaratha's Third Wife, Bharat's Mother
- Tina Ghai as Manthara, Kaikeyi's Maid
- Pradeep Sharma as Janak, Sita and Urmila's Father
- Shalini Kapoor Sagar as Sunaina, Sita And Urmila's Mother
- Raman Khatri as Kushadhwaj, Mandavi And Shrutakirti's Father
- Rakesh Vidwa as Shatanand, Devi Ahalya's son, Royal Perceptor Of Nimi Clan
- A.K. Agnihotri as Mithila's Prime Minister
- Rajita Kocchar as Kaikesi, Ravan's Mother
- Shameen Mistry as Tataka, Subahu and Marich's mother
- Vicky Mehra as Subahu, Ravan's Maternal Uncle
- Ramesh Goyal as Maricha, Ravan's Maternal Uncle
- Shashi Sharma as Mandodari, Ravan's Wife
- Rahul Solapurkar as Kumbhakarna, Ravan's Younger Brother
- Sandeep Mohan as Vibhishana, Ravan's Younger Brother
- Sheetal Maulik as Sarama, Vibhishan's Wife
- Swati Verma as Shurpanakha, Ravan, Kumbhakarn and Vibhishan's Sister
- Dharmesh Tiwari as Vasishtha, Royal Preceptor Of Ikshvaku Clan
- Bhakti Nirula as Arundhati, Vasishtha's Wife
- Somesh Agarwal as Kardama, Arundhati and Anusuya's Father
- Jayant Rawal as Atri, Anusuya's husband
- Anupama Kumar as Anusuya, Atri's wife
- Sanjay Swaraj as Gautama, Ahalya's husband, Shatanand's Father
- Deepali Sayyad as Ahalya, Gautam's wife, Shatanand's Mother
- Rammohan Sharma as Sumantra, Ayodhya's Prime Minister
- Rahul Sood as Prahasta, Ravan's Younger son
- Samar Jai Singh as Indrajit, Ravan's Elder Son
- Deepshikha Nagpal as Sulochana, Indrajit's Wife
- Praphulla Pandey as Akshayakumara, Ravan's Second Son
- Yashodhan Rana as Shiva
- Sheetal Bedi as Devi Parvati, Shiva's Wife
- Kinshuk Vaidya as Child Ram
- Sudhir Dalvi as Brahma
- Ritu Deepak as Devi Saraswati, Brahma's Wife
- Manoj Bhatia as Kesari, Hanuman's Father
- Prairna Agarwal as Añjanā, Hanuman's Mother
- Eshan Bhatia as Child Hanuman
- Kishore Puri as Indra
- Kishore Khatri as Chandra
- Sunil Nagar as Varuna
- Kamal Malik as Vayu, Hanuman's Spiritual Father
- Shankar Nagre as Ahiravana, Ravan's Brother
- Bhupindder Bhoopii as Khara, Cousin Brother Of Ravana
- Sagar Salunkhe as Parashuram
- Suhas Khandke as Vasuki, Father Of Sulochana
- Javed Khan as Vishwamitra, Ram and Lakshman's Mentor
- Armaan Anwar Khan As Vali
- Rajesh Singh as Sugriv
- Seema Pandey as Tara, Vali's Wife
- Mona Parekh as Rumā, Sugriv's Wife
- Manish Garg as Vishvabandhu, Ayodhya's Royal Poet
- Tushar Vora as Dilīpa, Raghu's Father
- Deepak Velenkar as Rishyasringa, The Chief Priest Of Putrakameshthi Yagya Organised By Dasharath
- Sonali Suryavanshi as Ganga, A Sacred River Goddess
- Mamata Kapoor as Narmada, a Sacred River Goddess
- Priyanka Saini as Yagyadevi

== Ramayan (2002 TV series) & Vishnu Puran (2000 TV series) ==
=== Actors who played same characters in both series ===
- Nitish Bharadwaj played Ram and Vishnu in both the series.
- Ayush Pandey played Bharat in both the Series.
- Pradeep Sharma played Janak in both the series.
- Javed Khan played Vishwamitra in both the series.
- Dolly Minas played Kaikeyi in both the series.
- Tina Ghai played Manthara in both the series.
- Shashi Sharma played Mandodari in both the series.
- Sudhir Dalvi played Brahma in both the series.
- Rajita Kocchar played Kaikesi in both the series.

=== Actors who changed their roles ===
- Samar Jai Singh played Shiv in Vishnupuran and Meghanad in Ramayan.
- Surendra Pal played Shukracharya in Vishnupuran and Ravan in Ramayan.
- Dharmesh Tiwari played Sumantra in Vishnupuran and Vashishth in Ramayan.
- Bijay Anand played young Meghanad in Vishnupuran and Lakshman in Ramayan.
- Amit Pachori played Lakshman in Vishnupuran and Shatrughan in Ramayan.
- Sagar Salunkhe played Vishwamitra in Vishnupuran and Parshuram in Ramayan.
- Sandeep Mohan played Indra in Vishnupuran and Vibhishan in Ramayan.
- Deepak Jethi played Kalaketu in Vishnupuran and Hanuman in Ramayan.
- Mona Parekh played Kayadhu and Anusuya in Vishnupuran and Rumā, Sugriv's wife in Ramayan.
- Shalini Kapoor Sagar played Renuka in Vishnupuran and Sunayana in Ramayan.
- Yashodhan Rana played Prahlad and Meghnad/Indrajit in Vishnupuran and Shiva in Ramayan.
- Kinshuk Vaidya played child Prahlad in Vishnupuran and child Rama in Ramayan.

== Reception ==
Even though Ramayan did not prove to be as successful as Mahabharat (1988 TV series) but it did become popular. Within a year, B.R Films had released 48 episodes of the series. In May 2003, it was consistently in Zee's top ten ratings. Although its a forgotten serial of the old era, It was one of the most watched tv serial during 2002-2003.
