= Mandavi =

Wife of Bharata in epic Ramayana

- Princess of Videha; Princess consort of Kosala; Queen consort of Gandhara and Kamboja
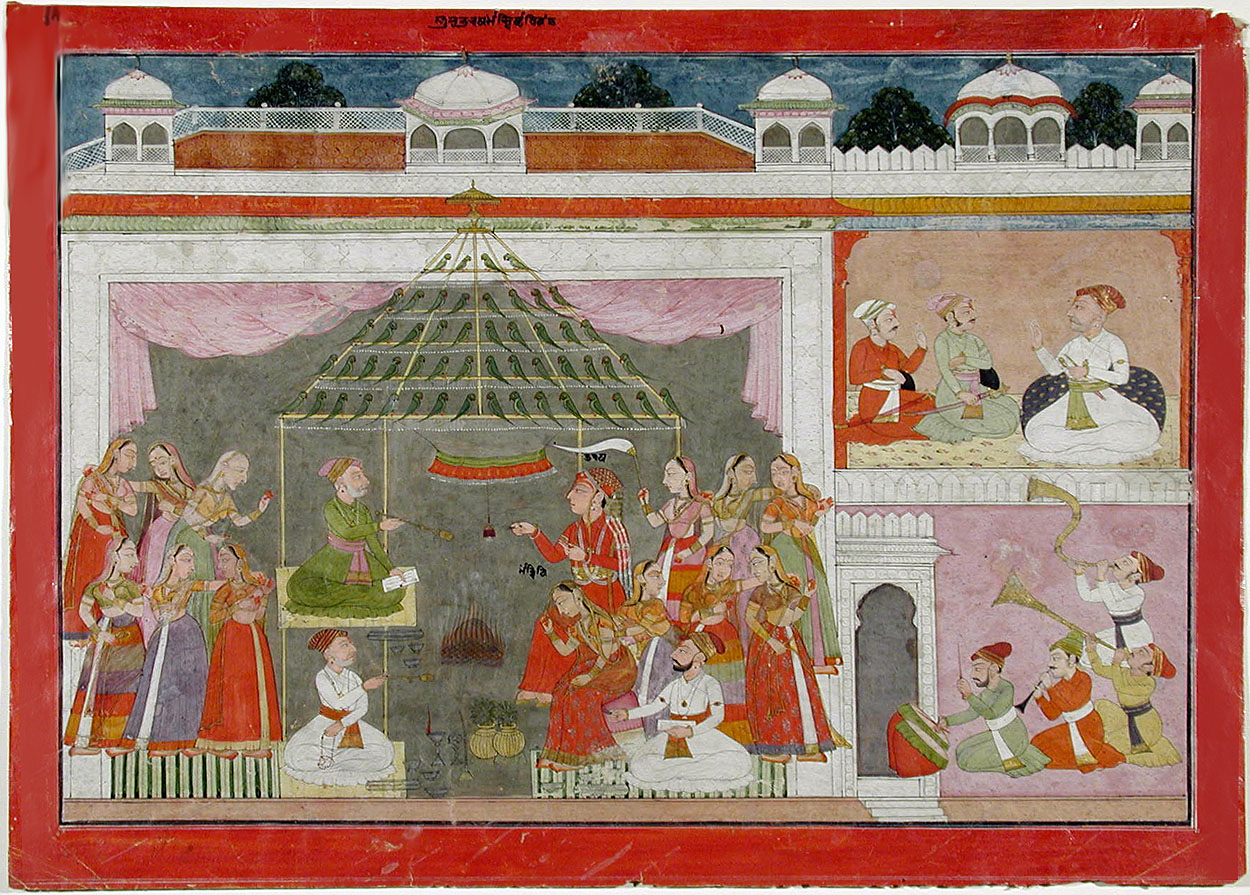
- The wedding ceremony of Mandavi and Bharata.
- Abode: Ayodhya
- Texts: Ramayana and its other versions

Genealogy
- Born: Mithila, Videha
- Died: Ayodhya
- Parents: Kushadhvaja (father); Chandrabhaga (mother)
- Siblings: Sita (adoptive cousin); Urmila (cousin); Shrutakirti (sister)
- Spouse: Bharata
- Children: Taksha; Pushkala
- Dynasty: Videha (by birth); Raghuvamsha-Suryavamsha (by marriage)

Mandavi (Sanskrit: मांडवी, romanized: Māṇḍavī) is a princess of Videha in the Hindu epic Ramayana. She is the wife of Bharata and is considered an incarnation of the shankha (conch shell) of goddess Lakshmi. Mandavi is known for her sacrifice and perseverance.

== Etymology ==
The name Mandavi is of Sanskrit origin. Her name means 'fit and competent'.

== Legend ==
=== Birth ===
Sunayana and Chandrabhaga, the wives of Janaka and Kushadhvaja, gave birth to Urmila and Mandavi. Chandrabhaga later gave birth to her second daughter and Mandavi's younger sister, Shrutakirti. She is considered as the incarnation of Lakshmi's conch shell. Her father was the ruler of Samkasya, but Mandavi and Shrutakirti were brought up in Mithila, along with Sita and Urmila.

=== Marriage to Bharata ===
After Rama won the hand of Sita at her svayamvara, his father, King Dasharatha arrived in Mithila for his son's wedding. King Dasharatha noticed that Lakshmana had feelings for Urmila, but according to tradition, Bharata and Mandavi had to marry first. King Dasharatha arranged for Bharata to marry Mandavi and for Shatrughna to marry Shrutakirti, allowing Lakshmana to marry Urmila. Ultimately, all four sisters married the four brothers, strengthening the alliance between the kingdoms. The wedding ceremony was conducted under the guidance of Shatananda.

Mandavi and Bharata had two sons named Taksha and Pushkala. While, Taksha founded the city of Taksha-sila, to the east of Indus, Pushkala founded Pushkala-vati, to the west of the Indus.

=== Bharata's exile ===
When her mother-in-law Kaikeyi, compelled Dasharatha to make Bharata king and forced Rama to leave Ayodhya and spend a period of exile. Sita and Lakshmana willingly renounced the comforts of the palace and joined Rama in exile. Bharata decided to lead a life in exile at Nandigram, till the completion of Rama's exile. On his request, Mandavi stayed back in Ayodhya to look after her husband's aging parents. Mandavi then decided to not meet her husband for those fourteen years, so that he could devotee his time for the welfare of Ayodhya and fulfill his brother's responsibilities.

=== Death ===
According to a legend in Tulsidas's Ramcharitmanas, Mandvi along with her sister Shrutakirti, became Sati with her husband, and died after her husband's samadhi. While, Urmila stayed in Ayodhya to look after her son's Angada and Chandraketu, and Sita's sons Lava and Kusha.

== Assessment ==
Though she finds little mention in the original epic, Mandavi is known as a pious woman and an ideal wife. She dedicated herself in the service of her husband and his parents. Kavita Kane said,

"Mandavi remains in the palace of Ayodhya as her husband Bharat resides in a hut in Nandigram and displays perseverance. She recede further into the background as the story progresses, her presence is felt through the turmoil that threatens to rip the family apart."

== Worship ==
In the Medak district of Telangana, there is a temple called Sri Kalyana Ramachandra Sannadhi that is dedicated to Bharata and Mandavi. This temple is the only one in India that has installed statues of Rama's brothers and their wives.

== In popular culture ==
=== Films ===
The following person portrayed Mandavi in the film adaptation of Ramayana.

- Churni Ganguly portrayed her in the 1997 Hindi film Lav Kush.
- Riya Kapoor portrayed her in the 2026 Hindi film, Ramayana: Part 1.

=== Television ===
The following people portrayed Mandavi in the television adaptation of Ramayana.

- Sulakshana Khatri portrayed her in the 1987 series Ramayan and the 1998 series Luv Kush.
- Raji Sharma / Anita Hassanandani portrayed her in the 1997 series Jai Hanuman.
- Rajni Chandra portrayed her in the 2002 series Ramayan.
- Krupa Chandera portrayed her in the 2008 series Ramayan.
- Prithvi Hatte portrayed her in the 2015 series Siya Ke Ram.
- Richa Dixit portrayed her in the 2019 series Ram Siya Ke Luv Kush.
- Sheersha Tiwari portrayed her in the 2024 series Shrimad Ramayan.
- Harshita Patharia portrayed her in the 2024 DD National series Kakabhushundi Ramayan- Anasuni Kathayein.

=== Books ===
- Mandvi by Shri Uma, published in 1996
