= Samar Jai Singh =

Indian film actor and acting trainer (born 1966)

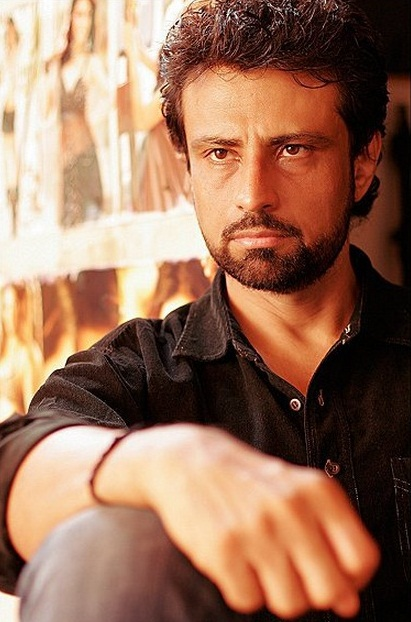
- Born: 26 September 1966 (age 59); Indore, Madhya Pradesh, India
- Occupations: Film Actor; Acting coach
- Years active: 1992 - present

Samar Jai Singh (born 26 September 1966) is an Indian film actor and acting trainer. He graduated from Government Law College, but started in Indian film and television industry in 1992. Samar is an acting coach as one of the founders and directors of Kreating Charakters acting school, since 2005, in Mumbai. He became famous as Lord Shiva in the TV series Om Namah Shivay, in 1997.

== Career ==
As an actor, he has worked in wide range of films from Film and Television Institute of India – FTII, in Pune, to National Film Development Corporation Limited - NFDC, in Mumbai. On television, he has worked as lead player on several entertainment channels.

== Filmography ==
=== Television ===
- Samrat Ashok (1992) as Emperor Ashok, directed by Prakash Mehata.
- Om Namah Shivay (1997) as Lord Shiva, directed by Dheeraj Kumar.
- Ek Aur Mahabharat (1997) as Karna directed by Chandraprakash Dwivedi.
- Vishnu Puran (2000) as Lord Shiva, directed by Ravi Chopra.
- Kahani Ghar Ghar Ki as Harpreet Gill
- Ramayan (2002) as Indrajit, directed by B. R. Chopra.
- Saara Akaash
- Sher-e-Punjab: Maharaja Ranjit Singh (2017) as Sahib Singh Bedi

=== Film ===
- Vishwatma as Brother of Madan Bhardwaj
- Little War (1994) FTII directed by Atanu Biswas.
- Sundari (1997) NFDC directed by Gul Bahar Singh.
- Gadar: Ek Prem Katha (2001) as Salim
- Pinjar: Beyond Boundaries... (2003)
- Ab Tumhare Hawale Watan Saathiyo (2004)
- Apne (2007)
- Ek Tha Tiger (2012) as Rabinder
- Heropanti (2014) as Bhupi
- Haseena Parkar (2017) as Inspector Ranbir Likha
- Friends in Law (2018)
- Samrat Prithviraj (2022) as Mahamantri Kaimas
- 2020 Delhi (2025)

== Sources ==
- The God Factory
- Heropanti - Bollywood Movie - Personal Reviews
- Bollywood calling for Bahraini journalist
- Kreating Charakters Veteran actor and trainer Samar Jai Singh in action
- Veteran actor Samar Jai Singh stills
