= Ram Siya Ke Luv Kush =

Indian mythological television series

- Created by: Siddharth Kumar Tewary
- Based on: Ramayana
- Developed by: Siddharth Kumar Tewary
- Written by: Mahesh Pandey
- Starring: See below
- Country of origin: India
- Original language: Hindi
- No. of seasons: 1
- No. of episodes: 141

Production
- Producers: Siddharth Kumar Tewary; Gayatri Gill Tewary
- Production locations: Mumbai, Maharashtra, India
- Camera setup: Multi-camera
- Running time: 22 minutes
- Production company: Swastik Productions

Original release
- Network: Colors TV
- Release: 5 August 2019 – 10 February 2020

Ram Siya Ke Luv Kush (transl. Ram Siya's Luv Kush) is an Indian mythological drama television series, which aired on Colors TV from 5 August 2019 to 10 February 2020. The series focused on the story of Rama and Sita as well as their children Luv and Kush. It starred Shivya Pathania, Himanshu Soni, Krish Chauhan, and Harshit Kabra in lead roles.

== Plot ==
The serial starts with Ram coming back to Ayodhya after the victory over Lanka and after 14 years of exile. On the day of Sita's pregnancy announcement, a washerwoman comes and tells Ram and Sita how she was harassed by her husband. She describes her condition but later, her husband raises questions upon her character. Ram orders that she be given justice. Soon, rumors started spreading in Ayodhya about Sita's chastity: that she had stayed in the house of Ravan, another man for nearly a year and even though she did the “Agni Pariksha,” people still questioned her purity. Sita decided that she wanted to stop the harassment against women. Consequently, she left Ayodhya and promised not to meet Ram before the completion of her objective. Later, she gives birth to twins named Luv and Kush at Valmiki's hermitage after proving her chastity under the pseudonym of Vandevi. Fourteen years passed, the brothers start listening to the verses of Ramayan from Sita Valmiki and Shatrughna. During ashvmedha yajna they doubted Ram's love for Sita and stopped the ashva. Then the whole family battled and finally they get their answers. Sita breaks the truth after that they are children of Ayodhya king Rama and she is Sita not vandevi. Brothers leave for Ayodhya to recite Ramayana to change the mindset of their male-dominated society. They started from the case of Shurpanakha. Finally, they were able to change the men’s mindset and get the women their rights back. Luv and Kush unite Sita and Ram. Sita goes inside Mother Earth as all her life’s motives have been fulfilled. Luv and Kush get their rights. After some time, Ram does Jal Samadhi and leaves the earth for heaven where he meets Sita. The show concludes with Ram and Sita blessing everyone else.

== Cast ==
=== Main ===
- Himanshu Soni as Rama: 7th Avatar of Vishnu; Dasharatha and Kausalya's son; Sumitra and Kaikeyi's step-son; Lakshmana, Shatrughna and Bharata's half-brother; Sita's husband; Lava and Kusha's father. (2019–2020)
- Shivya Pathania as Sita: Avatar of Lakshmi; Bhumi's daughter; Janaka and Sunayana's adoptive daughter; Urmila's adoptive sister; Shrutakirti and Mandavi's adoptive cousin; Rama's wife; Lava and Kusha's mother. (2019–2020)
- Krish Chauhan as Kusha: Rama and Sita's elder son; Lava's twin-brother. (2019–2020)
- Harshit Kabra as Lava: Rama and Sita's younger son; Kusha's twin-brother. (2019–2020)

=== Recurring ===
- Ankur Nayyar as Dasharatha: Kausalya, Sumitra and Kaikeyi's husband; Rama, Lakshmana, Shatrughna and Bharata's father; Sita, Urmila, Shrutakirti and Mandavi's father-in-law; Lava, Kusha, Angada, Chandraketu, Subahu, Shatrughati, Taksha and Pushkala's grandfather. (2019–2020)
- Jaswinder Gardener as Kaushalya: Dasharatha's first wife; Rama's mother; Sita's mother-in-law; Lava and Kusha's grandmother. (2019–2020)
- Preetu Gandwani as Sumitra: Dasharatha's second wife; Shanta, Lakshamana and Shatrughna's mother; Urmila and Shrutakirti's mother-in-law; Angada, Chandraketu, Subahu and Shatrughati's grandmother. (2019–2020)
- Navi Bhangu as Lakshmana: Avatar of Shesha; Dasharatha and Sumitra's elder son; Kausalya and Kaikeyi's step-son; Shatrughna's brother; Rama and Bharata's half-brother; Urmila's husband; Angada and Chandraketu's father. (2019–2020)
- Nisha Nagpal as Urmila: Janaka and Sunayana's daughter; Sita's adoptive sister; Shrutakirti and Mandavi's cousin; Lakshmana's wife; Angada and Chandraketu's mother. (2019–2020)
- Akhil Kataria as Shatrughna: Avatar of Sudarshana Chakra; Dasharatha and Sumitra's younger son; Kausalya and Kaikeyi's step-son; Lakshmana's brother; Rama and Bharata's half-brother; Shrutakirti's husband; Subahu and Shatrughati's father. (2019–2020)
- Nikita Tiwari as Shrutakirti: Kushadhvaja and Chandrabhaga's daughter; Mandavi's sister; Urmila's cousin; Shatrughna's wife; Subahu and Shatrughati's mother. (2019–2020)
- Piyali Munshi as Kaikeyi: Dasharatha's third wife; Bharata's mother; Mandavi's mother-in-law; Taksha and Pushkala's grandmother. (2019–2020)
- Kanan Malhotra as Bharata: Avatar of Panchajanya; Dasharatha and Kaikeyi's son; Kausalya and Sumitra's step-son; Rama, Lakshmana and Shatrughna's half-brother; Mandavi's husband; Taksha and Pushkala's father. (2019–2020)
- Richa Dixit as Mandavi: Kushadhvaja and Chandrabhaga's daughter; Shrutakirti's sister; Urmila's cousin; Bharata's wife; Taksha and Pushkala's mother. (2019–2020)
- Kiran Sharma as Manthara : Kaikeyi's maid (2019–20)
- Shahbaz Khan as Janaka : Sita and Urmila's Father and King of Mithila (2019–20)
- Sampada Vaze as Sunayana : Sita and Urmila's Mother and Queen of Mithila (2019–20)
- Zuber Ali as Hanuman : Pawandev and Anjani's Son; Rama's Spiritual devotee (2019–20)
- Sanjiv Sharma as Valmiki : Luv and Kush's Teacher; author of Ramayana (2019–20)
- Brownie Parashar as Vashishtha : Raghukul Brothers' teacher (2019–20)
- Shaleen Bhanot as Ravana : King of Lanka; Mandodari's husband (2019–20)
- Falaq Naaz as Mandodari : Ravana's Wife (2019–20)
- Priya Sindhu as Shurpanakha : Ravana's Younger Sister. Her nose was cut by Lakshmana when she tried to attack Sita to marry Rama (2019–20)
- Ajay Mishra as Vibhishana : Ravana's younger brother who supported Rama (2019–20)
- Vinit Kakar as Meghanada : Mandodari and Ravana's eldest Son (2019–20)
- Nitant Kaushik as Dheera (2019–20)
- Tarun Khanna as Parashuram(6th avatar of Lord Vishnu/ Shiva (2019–20)
- Nimai Bali as Vali / Sugriva (2019–20)
- Priyanka Malviya as Tara (2019–20)
- Vaishali Shrivastava as Rumā (2019–20)
- Puneet Vashisht as Vishwamitra: Rama and Lakshmana's mentor in Tadaka, Subahu's slaying, Sita's swayamvar (2019–20)
- Vijay Badlani as Lord Indra King Of Gods, Lord Of Lightning, and Vali's father (2019–20)
- Sandeep Rajora as Lord Surya Lord Sun, and Sugriva's father (2019–20)
- Rohit Sagar as Lord Vayu Lord of Wind, and Hanuman's father
- Sachin Yadav as Lord Agni God of fire (2019–20)
- Patrali Chattopadhyay as Tataka (2019–20)
- Yogesh Mahajan as Gautama (2019–20)
- Manisha Saxena as Ahalya (2019–20)
- Aleya Ghosh as Bhudevi (2019–20)
- Vasundhara Kaul as Mrutali (2019–20)
- Ajay Jayram as Nagarseth (2019–20)
- Pooja Sharma as River Sarayu, the Narrator (2019–20)
- Rajshekhar Upadhya as Purohit (2019–20)
- Nitin Parashar as Angada : Tara and Vali's Son (2019–20)
- Kamal Bohra as Nagarseth Son (2019–20)

== Production and release ==
Viacom18 partnered with UC Browser for promoting the series. The show was launched in Ayodhya in a grand manner.

The budget of the series is about ₹650 crore with the sets set at Umargam in Gujarat, making it the most expensive Indian television series. Each episode had a budget of 4 crores.

The shoot of the series ended on 7 February 2020.

== Controversy ==
Protests were started by the Valmiki Community of Punjab to ban the series for representing a disfigured fact on the Sage Valmiki. A bandh of markets was called on 9 September 2019 by them. Amidst this issue, a man was shot in Jalandhar, Punjab. After this, the series was banned in Punjab on the orders of the CM Amarinder Singh. This bandh also caused discrepancies in train and bus services in Ludhiana.

The ministry of information and broadcasting council sent a notice on 11 September 2019 to the channel giving 15 days time for responding stating,

"The show is harming the image of Maharishi Valmiki and causing hurt to the religious sentiments of a community."

It further stated,

"Lord Ram has been shown to have visited Maharishi Valmiki’s ashram and met Luv and Kush, which is not true. He met Luv and Kush at the time of the Ashwamedh Yagya, when they captured their horse and waged a war."

On 9 September 2019, the Punjab and Haryana High Court refused to stay the ban on the telecast of the series imposed by the state of Punjab. During the hearing, the channel argued on the ban order stating that it was passed without adhering to the principles of natural justice, and without the ingredients of Section 19 of the Cable Operators Regulation Act. They also offered to delete the scenes causing the controversy which was considered by the court thereby adjourning the case for the next hearing on 12 September. This resulted an imposement of FIR against the channel, producers and the actors in Amritsar and Jalandhar. They got an interim stay on the proceedings against them until 28 January 2020.

"The show draws from various texts, books and scriptures based on Ramayan and it is never our intention to hurt sentiments of any particular group,"

a Viacom18 spokesperson said in a statement issued on 14 September 2019. They further stated,

"We are closely working with the group and taking their feedback on board. We stay committed to working together to make this a show that Indians across geographies and generations enjoy uninhibited,"

On 17 October 2019, the court set the ban order aside when the producers agreed to take corrective action for it. The hearing stated, "What clearly emerges is that the state government having taken a conscious decision of setting up a committee to look into the entire issue and the committee, post deliberations having suggested certain corrective measures/steps, the same have not only been accepted by the petitioner party but have been implemented in so far as the previous episodes of the serial and now have furnished an undertaking to even adhere to such corrective measures/steps for future telecast as well,". Further, the representatives of the channel agreed to delete that scene in all the digital platforms and also to air a special episode on the greatness of Valmiki in accordance with the information provided by the community.
