= Urmila =

Hindu goddess and wife of Lakshmana in epic Ramayana

- Princess of Videha; Princess consort of Kosala; Queen consort of Karupada
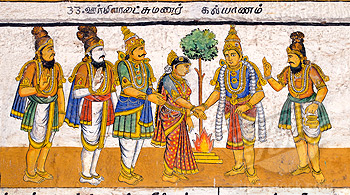
- Wedding ceremony of Urmila and Lakshmana
- Devanagari: ऊर्मिला
- Affiliation: Avatar of Nagalakshmi Devi
- Abode: Ayodhya, Vaikuntha, Kshira Sagara
- Texts: Ramayana and its other versions
- Gender: Female

Genealogy
- Born: Mithila, Videha
- Died: Ayodhya
- Parents: Siradhwaja Janaka (father); Sunayana (mother)
- Siblings: Sita (adoptive sister); Mandavi (cousin); Shrutakirti (cousin)
- Spouse: Lakshmana
- Children: Angada; Chandraketu
- Dynasty: Videha (by birth); Raghuvamsha-Suryavamsha (by marriage)

Urmila (Sanskrit: ऊर्मिला, romanized: Urmilā, lit. 'enchantress'), is a Hindu goddess and the princess of Videha in the epic Ramayana.She is also considered an avatar of Nagalakshmi.

Urmila was born as the daughter of King Janaka of Mithila and Queen Sunayana. Sita, the female protagonist of the epic, is her elder sister. She is married to Lakshmana after her sister's svayamvara. According to legend, Urmila slept continuously for fourteen years, in an event called Urmila Nidra, so that her husband could stay awake throughout those years protecting Rama and Sita during the exile. Urmila is worshipped in Hinduism, at various places in India, alongside her husband.

== Etymology ==
The name Urmila is of Sanskrit origin, and could be divided into Ur meaning waves, and mila, meaning to join. Thus, her name means 'waves of passion that unite a couple'. Her name also means 'humble' or 'enchantress'.

== Legend ==
=== Birth and early life ===
Urmila was born as the daughter of King Janaka of Mithila and Queen Sunayana. Urmila is considered as the incarnation of Nagalakshmi, Shesha's consort. In the Garga Samhita, Nagalakshmi is considered to be the personification of the divine ocean called the Kshira Sagara and is called as Kshira.

Urmila was born on Jaya ekadashi, after her elder sister Sita, was adopted by her parents. Mandavi and Shrutakirti are her cousins, who were born to her father's younger brother, Kushadhvaja and his wife Chandrabhaga. According to legends, she was a scholar and an artist.

=== Marriage to Lakshmana ===
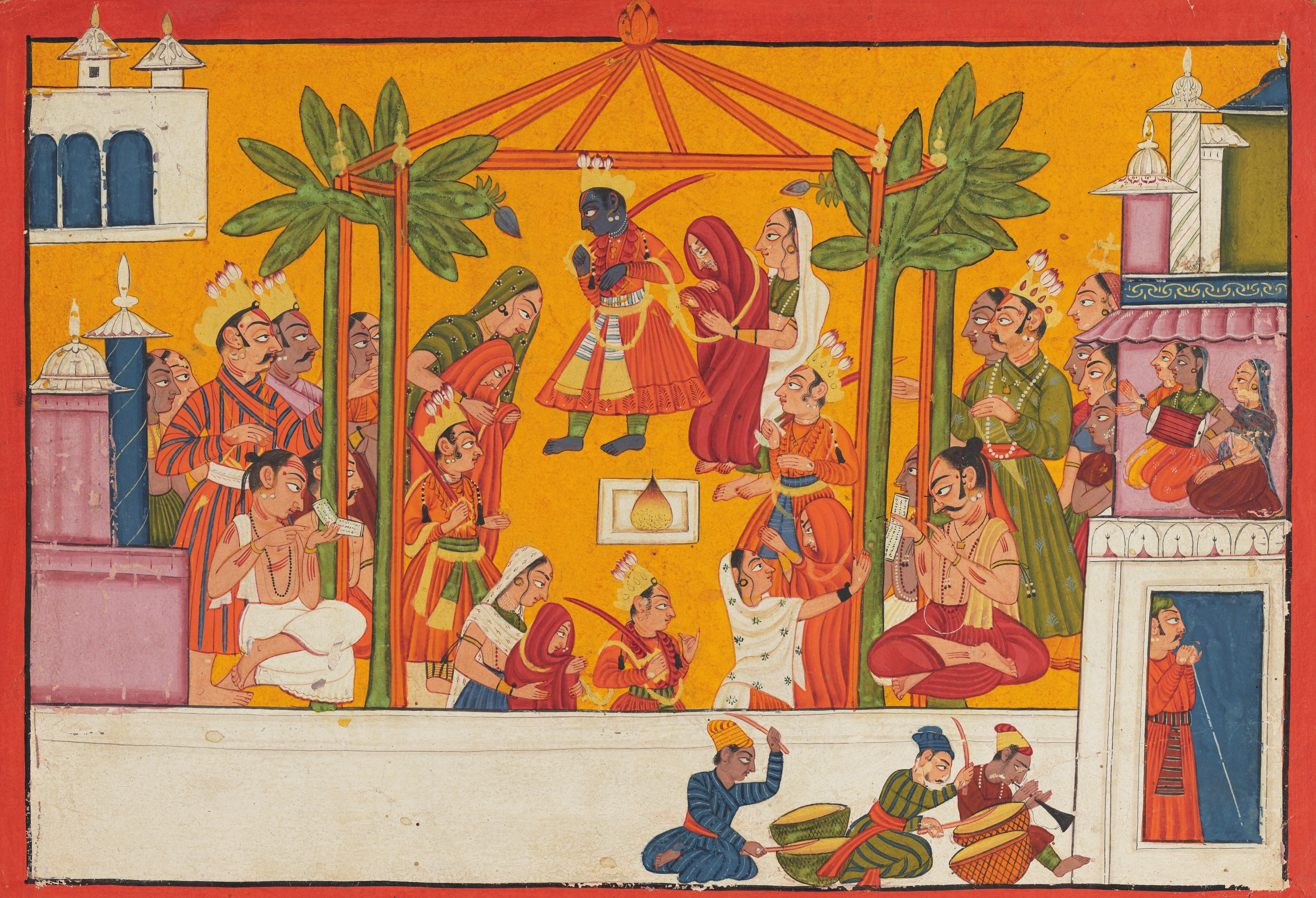
The wedding ceremony of Urmila and Lakshmana, along with the other three brothers and sisters. Folio from the Shnagri Ramayana, early 18th-century. National Museum, New Delhi

After Rama won the svayamvara of Sita, their marriage was fixed. King Dasharatha arrived in Mithila for his son's wedding and noticed that Lakshmana had feelings for Urmila, but according to tradition, Bharata and Mandavi were to marry first. King Dasharatha then arranged for Bharata to marry Mandavi and Shatrughna to marry Shrutakirti, allowing Lakshmana to marry Urmila. Ultimately, all four sisters married the four brothers, strengthening the alliance between the two kingdoms. The wedding ceremony was conducted under the guidance of Shatananda. During the homeward journey to Ayodhya, another avatar of Vishnu, Parashurama, challenged Rama to combat, on the condition that he was able to string the bow of Vishnu, Sharanga. When Rama obliged him with success, Parashurama acknowledged the former to be a form of Vishnu and departed to perform penance at the mountain Mahendra. The wedding entourage then reached Ayodhya, entering the city amid great fanfare.

According to Vishvamitra, Urmila and Lakshmana equal each other in "grace and heritage". Urmila and Lakshmana had two sons named Angada and Chandraketu. Urmila is described as being as dedicated to Sita as Lakshmana was to Rama.

=== Exile and Urmila Nidra ===
Some time after the wedding, Kaikeyi compelled Dasharatha to make Bharata king, prompted by the coaxing of her maid Manthara, and forced Rama to leave Ayodhya and spend a period of exile. Sita and Lakshmana willingly renounced the comforts of the palace and joined Rama in exile. Urmila was ready to accompany her husband, but he asked her to stay back in Ayodhya, so that she could take care of his aging parents and he could serve his brother and his wife.

According to a legend, Urmila decided to sleep continuously for fourteen years, so that her husband could protect his brother and sister-in-law. On the first night of exile, when Rama and Sita were sleeping, the deity Nidra appeared before Lakshmana and he requested her to offer him the boon of not sleeping for the fourteen years. The goddess asked him that she could grant his wish, but someone else would have to take his place asleep. Lakshmana asked the goddess to enquire his wife Urmila regarding this, who happily accepted the task. Urmila slept continuously for the fourteen years of exile, in an event called Urmila Nidra.

=== Post exile and later life ===
When Lakshmana returned from the exile, he woke his wife. Urmila opened her eyes and wept with joy when she saw him. Rama was then crowned the King of Kosala. According to the Uttara Kanda, Lakshmana had ruled over Karupada, with Urmila as the queen, who advised him on important state matters.

Urmila and Lakshmana's elder son Angada, inherited the Kingdom of Karupada, from his father and their younger son Chandraketu, inherited the kingdom of Mallya, being commissioned by Rama.

=== Death ===
According to a legend in Tulsidas's Ramcharitmanas, after Sita and Lakshmana's death, Rama, Bharata and Shatrughan's samadhi, Mandvi and Shrutakirti, became Sati and died after their husband's samadhi. As per the promise given to her sister Sita, Urmila stayed in Ayodhya to look after her son's Angada and Chandraketu, and Sita's sons Lava and Kusha. After few years, Urmila took samadhi in the Sarayu river. But According to some theories it is also said that she took Samadhi with Lakshmana in the Sarayu river.

== In other versions ==
=== Jain version ===
Urmila is referred to as Prithvisundari in Jain Ramayana. According to Jain storytelling, Lakshmana had around sixteen thousand wives in which Prithvisundari was his principle consort (in the Hindu epic, he had only one wife Urmila).

=== Mahaviracharita ===
The Sanskrit play Mahaviracharita by Bhavabhuti is based on the early life of Rama. According to the play, Vishwamitra invites Janaka to attend his sacrifice, but he sends his brother Kushadhvaja and daughters Sita and Urmila, as his delegates. This is the place, where Laxman and Urmila meet for the first time. By the end of the act, Kushadhvaja and Vishwamitra decide to marry Sita and Urmila to Rama and Lakshamana.

== Portrayal and assessment ==
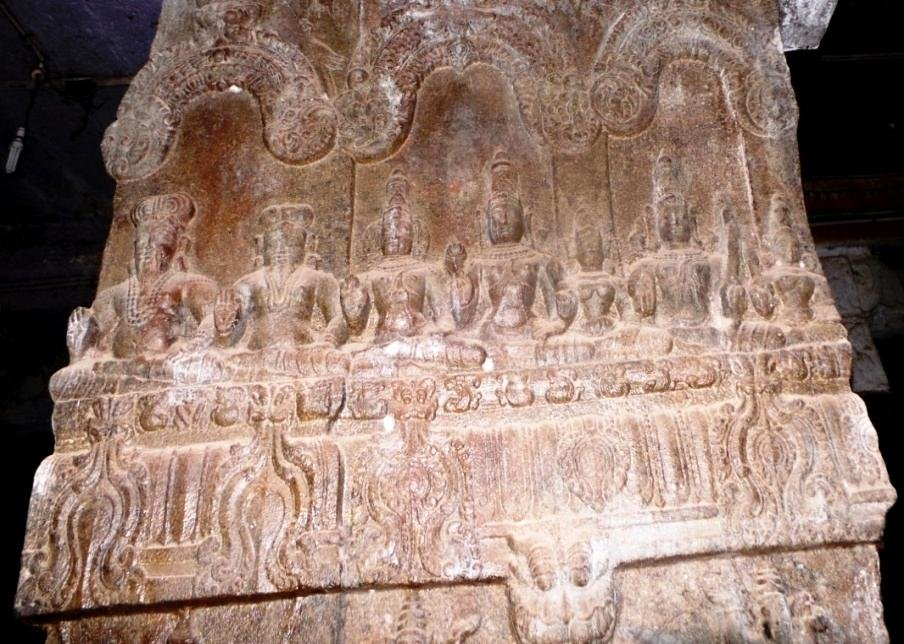
Urmila (extreme left to Rama, who is in centre). Sculpture at Ramasamy Temple at Kumbakonam

Urmila has been portrayed as an ideal wife and an ideal mother known for her sacrifice in various texts, stories, illustrations, movies. She is also portrayed as a devoted and patient wife who waits faithfully for her husband. She is often considered gentle, kind, compassionate and is known for her beauty and grace. The Balakanda chapter of the Ramayana, describe her as "illustrious".

मानस-मन्दिर में सती, पति की प्रतिमा थाप, जलती-सी उस विरह में, बनी आरती आप।

"Urmila has the image of her husband in her heart but she is distraught with the separation and is burning in it like the flame of an aarti."

– Maithili Sharan Gupt talks about Urmila's pain in his poem Saket.

Urmila was known for her sincerity towards her husband and her family, but at the same time she stood with what was right. She was the only one who fights for justice for her sister when Sita was banished from Ayodhya. In the Ramayana, Urmila displays patience and fortitude throughout. Her sister, Sita always considered Urmila's sacrifice to be much bigger than that of her.

== Temples and worship ==
Urmila alongside her husband, Lakshmana is worshipped across the country.

- In Bharatpur district of Rajasthan, there is a temple dedicated to Lakshmana and Urmila. The temple was built in 1870 AD by the then ruler Balwant Singh of Bharatpur and is considered as a Royal Temple by the royal family of Bharatpur State.
- In Bhind district of Madhya Pradesh, there is another temple dedicated to Lakshmana and Urmila.
- In the Medak district of Telangana, there is a temple called Sri Kalyana Ramachandra Sannadhi that is dedicated to Lakshmana and Urmila. This temple is the only one in India that has installed statues of Rama's brothers and their wives.
- Urmila also appears alongside Lakshmana, Rama and Sita, at the Ramaswamy Temple, Kumbakonam, through wall paintings and pillar structures.

== Influence and popular culture ==
Urmila's story and her sacrifice have inspired "painting, film, novels, poems, TV serials and plays". Prominently, she is depicted in all the adaptations of Ramayana.

=== Films ===
The following people portrayed Urmila in the film adaptation of Ramayana.

- Vasanthi portrayed her in the 1968 Telugu film Veeranjaneya.
- Sobha Kiran portrayed her in the 1977 Malayalam film Kanchana Sita.
- Svetha Rao portrayed her in the 1997 Telugu film Ramayanam.
- Isha Gupta portrayed her in the 1997 Hindi film Lav Kush.
- Nayani Dixit voiced her in the 2010 animated Hindi film Ramayana: The Epic.
- Sonia Balani portrayed her in the 2026 Hindi film, Ramayana: Part 1.

=== Television ===
The following people portrayed Urmila in the television adaptation of Ramayana.

- Anjali Vyas portrayed her in the 1987 series Ramayan and the 1998 series Luv Kush.
- Monika / Malavika Shivpuri portrayed her in the 1997 series Jai Hanuman.
- Vineeta Thakur portrayed her in the 2000 series Vishnu Puran.
- Ashwini Sidwani portrayed her in the 2002 series Ramayan.
- Meenakshi Arya portrayed her in the 2008 series Ramayan.
- Garima Jain portrayed her in the 2011 series Devon Ke Dev...Mahadev.
- Pallavi Sapra portrayed her in the 2012 series Ramayan.
- Suhasi Dhami portrayed her in the 2012 mini-series Ramleela – Ajay Devgn Ke Saath. Sadhna Sargam voiced for her in the song, "Jaao Na Morey Piya".
- Khyati Mangla portrayed her in the 2015 series Sankat Mochan Mahabali Hanumaan.
- Yukti Kapoor portrayed her in the 2015 series Siya Ke Ram.
- Nisha Nagpal portrayed her in the 2019 series Ram Siya Ke Luv Kush.
- Vaidehi Nair portrayed her in the 2024 series Shrimad Ramayan.
- Naviya Saini portrayed her in the 2024 series Kakabhushundi Ramayan- Anasuni Kathayein.

=== Plays ===
The following plays portrayed Urmila's suffering in the theatre adaptation of Ramayana.

- Urmila played a prominent role in the 1955 play, Bhoomikanya Sita, written by Bhargavaram Viththal Varerkar.
- Meedhu Mrityam portrayed her in Nimmy Raphel's 2023 play titled Urmila, that showcase her struggle with the emotional violence, post her husband's departure to exile.
- Her suffering was also portrayed in the "Laxman-Urmila episode" of the 2023 play, Prem Ramayan.

=== Books ===
The following novels talks about Urmila's life.

- Sita's Sister by Kavita Kané, published in 2014.
- Urmila by Pervin Saket, published in 2016.
- The Princess Who Slept For 14 Years by Tulika Singh, published in 2018.
- VISION and RE-VISION - Revisiting Mythologies, Rethinking Women by Beena. G.
- Urmila: The Forgotten Princess by Smriti Dewan, published in 2021.
- Princesses Recall: Stories of Grit and Sacrifice of Shanta, Ruma, Shrutakeerti and Urmila by Deepa Hariharan, published in 2021.
- LakshmiLa : The Eternal Love Story by Shubhi Agarwal, published in 2022.

=== Others ===
- Rabindranath Tagore, included Urmila in his article Upekshita, where he wrote about women who were ignored/overlooked.
- Hindi poet Maithili Sharan Gupt wrote about Urmila's plight after her husband leave for exile, in his 1931 famous poem Saket, that centres upon her life.
- Hindi poet Bal Krishna Sharma Naveen praised Urmila, in his 1957 poem Urmila, that centres upon her life and sacrifice.
- In 2006, a song titled Urmila Devi Nidra, was published, that talks about her sleeping for fourteen year and also centres upon how Lakshmana is reunited with Urmila.
