= Vishnu Puran (TV series) =

Indian mythological television series

- Created by: Ravi Chopra
- Based on: Bhagavata Purana
- Screenplay by: Ram Govind; Dialogues; Hassan Kamal; Satish Bhatnagar; Hassan Kamal; Ram Govind; Shafiq Ansari
- Directed by: Ravi Chopra
- Starring: Nitish Bhardwaj; Vaidehi Amrute
- Narrated by: Lata Haya
- Music by: Raj Kamal
- Opening theme: Shankar Mahadevan
- Country of origin: India
- Original language: Hindi
- No. of seasons: 1
- No. of episodes: 124

Production
- Producer: B. R. Chopra
- Cinematography: Dharam Chopra
- Camera setup: Multi-camera
- Running time: 40-45 minutes
- Production company: B. R. Films

Original release
- Network: Zee TV; DD National; DD Bharati
- Release: 23 January 2000 – 16 June 2002

Related
- Mahabharat (1988 TV series) Mahabharat Katha Ramayan (2002 TV series)

Vishnu Puran (also written Vishnupuran) is an Indian television series, by B. R. Chopra on the Hindu deity Vishnu. It is based on the Bhagavata Purana. Bhagavata Purana tells about the 10 incarnations of Vishnu, as well as other stories, such as the legend of Dhruva. The weekly series first aired Sunday morning, 23 January 2000 on Zee TV. The 124 episodes were later released on DD National.

The chief roles are played by Nitish Bharadwaj as Bhagwan Vishnu and Vaidehi Amrute as Devi Lakshmi. Nitish Bharadwaj previously played the role of Krishna, in Chopra's television adaptation of the epic Mahabharat. The Story was narrated by Lata Haya in the role of Dharti Maa. The music is composed by Raj Kamal who also worked on Mahabharat. The title song was sung by Shankar Mahadevan and the songs decoding summary of each episode was sung by Mahendra Kapoor & Soham Chakrabarty. During the COVID-19 pandemic in India, DD Bharati, DD National and Zee TV started re-airing episodes to entertain the public during the lockdown.

== Cast ==
- Nitish Bharadwaj as Bhagwan Vishnu / Vamana / Parashurama / Rama / Krishna (Krishna scenes from Mahabharat)
- Vaidehi Amrute as Mahadevi Lakshmi
- Sudhir Dalvi as Brahmadev
- Samar Jai Singh as Bhagwan Shiva
- Lata Haya as Dharti Maa (Narrator)
- Sandeep Mohan as Devraj Indra
- Neelam Sagar as Shachi
- Vikrant Chaturvedi as Devrishi Narada
- Nimai Bali as Jaya / Hiranyakashipu / Ravana
- Mahendra Ghule as Vijaya / Hiranyaksha / Kumbhakarna
- Rahul Solapurkar as Kumbhakarna
- Sameer Dharmadhikari as Manu
- Geeta Gore as Shatarupa
- Jibraan Khan as Dhruv
- Daman Maan as Uttanpada
- Jaya Mathur as Suniti
- Deepshikha Nagpal as Suruchi
- Surendra Pal as Shukracharya
- Shameem as Jayanti
- Pradeep Sharma as Kashyapa
- Virendra Razdan as Bhrigu
- Deepak Jethi as Kaalketu
- Sanjeev Siddharth as Arshal
- Varsha Usgaonkar as Mohini
- Kinshuk Vaidya as Child Prahlad
- Mona Parekh as
  - Kayadhu, Hiranyakashipu's wife
  - Anasuya
- Yashodhan Rana as
  - Prahlad
  - Meghnad
- Sunila Karambelkar / Unknown as Dhriti
- Jiten Lalwani as Virochana
- Ravi Kishan as Sudhanva
- Seema Pandey as Vishalakshi
- Siraj Mustafa Khan as Mahabali
- Arjun as Jamadagni
- Shalini Kapoor Sagar as Renuka
- Deep Dhillon as Kartavirya Arjuna (Sahasrarjuna)
- Adarsh Gautam / Pradeep Sharma as Janak Seerdhwaj
- Gargi Patel as Sunayana
- Reena Kapoor as Sita
- Vindu Dara Singh as Hanuman
- Amit Pachori as Lakshman
- Vineeta Thakur as Urmila
- Ayush Pandey as Bharat
- Aditya Vaidya as Shatrughna
- Rishabh Shukla as Dasharatha
- Alka Kubal as Kaushalya
- Dolly Minhas as Kaikeyi
- Kamalika Guha Thakurta as Sumitra
- Tina Ghai as Manthara
- Shashi Sharma as Mandodari
- Vinod Kapoor as Vibhishana
- Ramna Wadhwan / Rajeeta Kochhar as Kaikesi
- Premchand Sharma as Vishalaksh
- Ambika Jk as Gopika
- Vishnu Sharma as Vashistha
- Bijay Anand As Meghnad
- Vilas Raj as Maricha
- Sagar Salunkhe / Javed Khan as Vishwamitra
- Pradeep Saxena as Viprachitti

== Reception ==
Even though Vishnu Puran did not prove to be as successful as Mahabharat but it did become popular. Within a year, the series finished with the Vamana Avatara and The Hindu review said, "This lovely serial really overwhelmed us." By March 2001, it was consistently in Zee's top 10 ratings. By January 2003, it had completed 78 episodes with 100 more planned and was in the top 20 list. And for the week of 13–19 July 2003, it was in the top 5 for all homes, airing on Doordarshan National (DD1).
