= Shalini Kapoor =

Indian actress

- Born: Shalini Kapoor; Kolkata, West Bengal, India
- Occupation: Actress
- Years active: 1995–present
- Spouse: Rohit Sagar (m. 2008)
- Children: 1
- Relatives: Malini Kapoor (sister), Reena Kapoor (cousin)

Shalini Kapoor Sagar is an Indian television and theatre actress.

== Personal life ==
Kapoor is married to Rohit Sagar, a theatre and television actor. The couple gave birth to their daughter, Aadya in February 2011.

== Career ==
Kapoor debuted with a Dubai-based television show titled Dastaan. Her works include Om Namah Shivay, Vishnu Puran, Ramayan, Jai Maa Durga, Devon Ke Dev...Mahadev, Qubool Hai, Swaragini and Kahaan Hum Kahaan Tum.

== Filmography ==
=== Films ===
Year	Film	Role	Notes
1996	Sapoot	Anjali Singhania	
1997	Koi Kisise Kum Nahin	Mansi	
1998	Kudrat	Meena	
2000	Aaj Ka Ravan	Ramkali	
2000	Baaghi	Vikram's wife	
2001	Zahreela	Pooja	
2002	Har Har Mahadev	Shalini	
2003	Andaaz	Reema	
2018	Dhadak	Aashadevi	
2023	Shehzada	Aarti Jindal	

=== Television ===
Year	Serial	Role
1995	Dastaan	Shalini
1999	Om Namah Shivay	Karkati
2001	Vishnu Puran	Renuka
2001–2002	Jai Mahabharat	Ambika
2002	Ramayan	Sunaina
2003	Maharathi Karna	Kunti
2003–2004	Shri Sifarishi Lal	Miss Ohohoho
2005–2007	Hari Mirchi Lal Mirchi	Ritu Rohan Khanna
2006–2007	Solhah Singaarr	Iravati Bharadwaj
2007–2008	Ardhangini – Ek Khoobsurat Jeevan Saathi	Moonmoon
2008	Jai Maa Durga	Devi Durga
2008	CID	Shruti Singh
2009	Saat Phere – Saloni Ka Safar	Madhu
2010	Geet – Hui Sabse Parayi	Rano
2011–2012	Devon Ke Dev...Mahadev	Maharani Prasuti
2012–2014	Qubool Hai	Dilshad Rashid Khan
2015–2016	Swaragini – Jodein Rishton Ke Sur	Annapurna Durgaprasad Maheshwari
2018	Prithvi Vallabh – Itihaas Bhi Rahasya Bhi	Rajmata Vazda
2019–2020	Kahaan Hum Kahaan Tum	Veena Naren Sippy
2021–2022	Sirf Tum	Mamata Verma Oberoi
2023	Piya Abhimani	Kumud Srivastav
2023	Purnimaa	Guru Maa
2024–2025	Iss Ishq Ka Rabb Rakha	Meher Zorawar Singh Bajwa

=== Web series ===
Year	Title	Role	Network	Notes
2020	Chitthi	-	Kooku app	
2021	Qubool Hai 2.0	Dilshad	ZEE5	
