= Angad =

Angad is a Hindic Feminine and Masculine given name that may refer to the following notable people:

- Angada, a character in the Ramayana, a Sanskrit epic of ancient India
- Guru Angad (1504–1552), the second of the ten Sikh gurus of Sikhism
- Angad Bedi (born 1983), Indian film actor and model
- Angad Hasija (born 1984), Indian television actor
- Angad Paul (1970–2015), British businessman and film producer
