= Lakshmana =

Hindu god and Rama's brother in epic Ramayana

- Epitome of selflessness and dedication; Prince of Kosala; King of Karupada
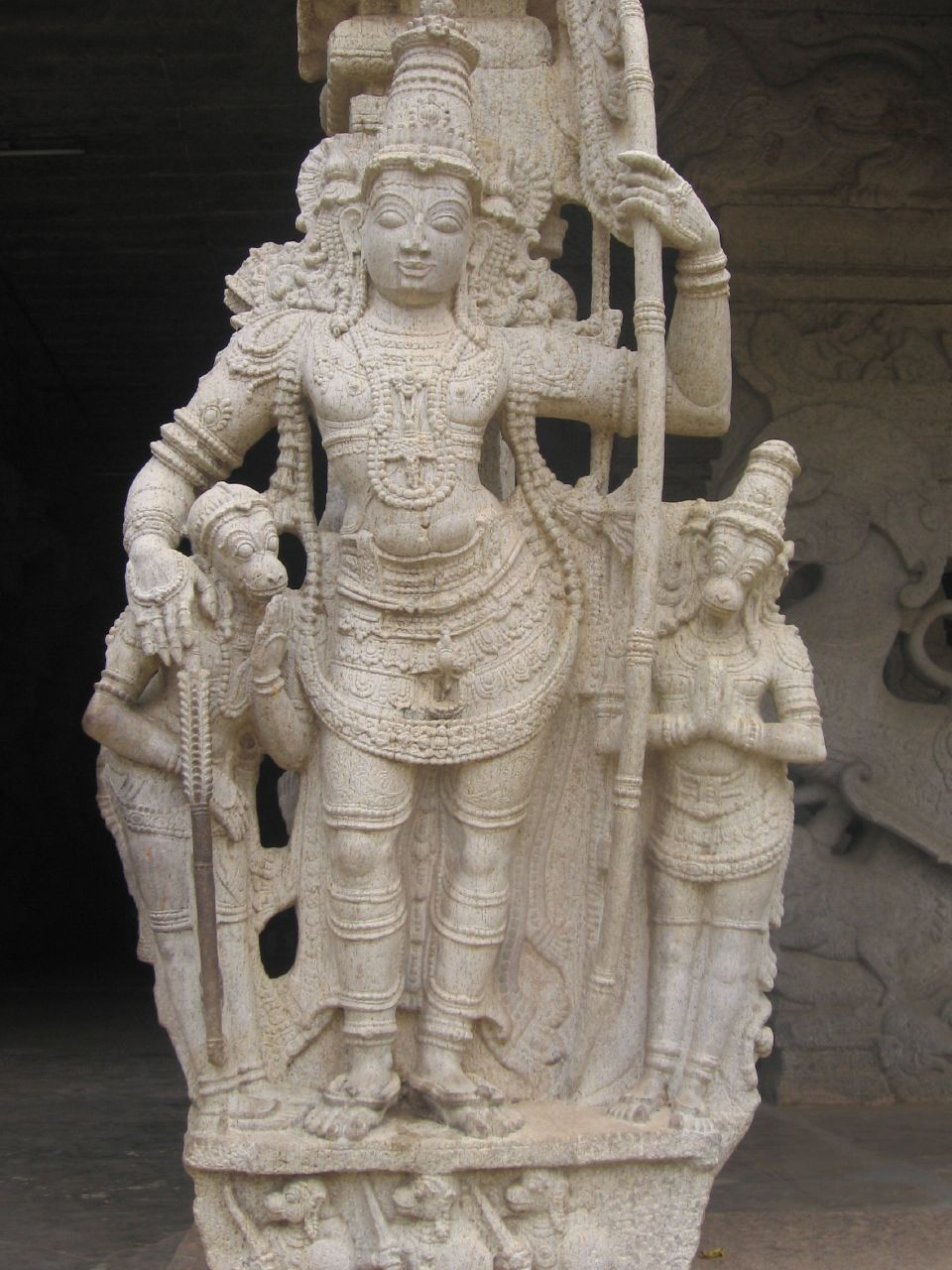
- Statue of Lakshmana at Srivaikuntanathan Perumal temple
- Devanagari: लक्ष्मण
- Affiliation: Avatar of Shesha
- Abode: Ayodhya, Vaikuntha, Kshira Sagara
- Weapon: Bow and Arrow, Dagger

Genealogy
- Avatar birth: Ayodhya, Kosala (present-day Uttar Pradesh, India)
- Avatar end: Sarayu river, Ayodhya, Kosala (present-day Uttar Pradesh, India)
- Parents: Dasharatha (father); Sumitra (mother); Kaikeyi (step-mother); Kausalya (step-mother)
- Siblings: Shatrughna (brother); Rama (half-brother); Bharata (half-brother)
- Spouse: Urmila
- Children: Angada; Chandraketu
- Dynasty: Raghuvaṃśa-Suryavaṃśa

Lakshmana (Sanskrit: लक्ष्मण, lit. 'the one endowed with auspicious signs', IAST: Lakṣmaṇa), also known as Laxmana, Saumitra, and Ramanuja, is the younger half-brother of Rama in the Hindu epic Ramayana. He is considered as an incarnation of Shesha, the lord of serpents. Lakshmana was married to Urmila, and is known for his loyalty and dedication towards Rama.

Lakshmana was born to King Dasharatha of Ayodhya and Queen Sumitra. Shatrughna is his twin brother. He was married to Urmila, after his brother Rama married Sita in her svayamvara. Lakshmana devoted himself to Rama since childhood and accompanied him during his fourteen-year exile, serving him and Sita. He also played a pivotal role in the war and killed Meghanada. Lakshmana is worshipped in Hinduism, at various places in India, alongside Rama and Sita.

== Etymology ==
The name Lakshmana is of Sanskrit origin, which means 'the one endowed with auspicious signs'. He bears the epithets of Saumitra (Sanskrit: सौमित्र, lit. 'son of Sumitra', IAST: Saumitra) and Ramanuja (Sanskrit: रामानुज, lit. 'younger brother of Rama', IAST: Rāmānuja).

The Malay loan laksamana has been used as the equivalent title to the admiral of modern Malaysian and Indonesian navies dating back to preceding Malay sultanates of 15-16th centuries following its use in the Hikayat Seri Rama, by the analogy of the admiral's loyalty to his sultan the 'Rama' as his commander-in-chief.

== Legend ==
=== Birth and early life ===
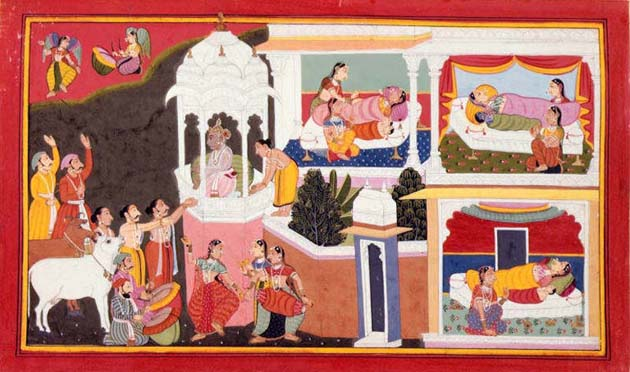
Birth of the four sons of Dasharatha

King Dasharatha of Ayodhya had three wives: Kausalya, Sumitra and Kaikeyi. He performed a yajna-Putrakameshti yajna to beget sons and as a result, his queens became pregnant. Lakshmana and his brother Shatrughna were born to Sumitra, while Rama and Bharata were born to Kausalya and Kaikeyi respectively.

In the Puranas, Lakshmana is described as an incarnation of Shesha, the multiple-headed naga (serpent) upon whom rests the preserver deity Vishnu, whose avatar Rama is considered to be. When sage Vishvamitra asked Rama to kill the demons in the forest, Lakshmana accompanied them and went to Mithila with them. Vishvamitra gave them the knowledge of the Devastras or celestial weaponry [bala and ati bala], trained them in advanced religion and guided them to kill powerful demons like Tataka, Maricha and Subahu.

=== Marriage to Urmila ===
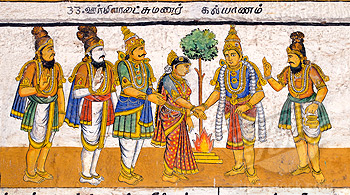
The marriage ceremony of Lakshmana and Urmila. Painting at Ramasamy Temple at Kumbakonam

After Rama won the Sita Svayamvara, their marriage was fixed. King Dasharatha arrived in Mithila for his son's wedding and noticed that Lakshmana had feelings for Urmila, but according to tradition, Bharata and Mandavi were to marry first. King Dasharatha then arranged for Bharata to marry Mandavi and Shatrughna to marry Shrutakirti, allowing Lakshmana to marry Urmila. Ultimately, all four sisters married the four brothers, strengthening the alliance between the two kingdoms. The wedding ceremony was conducted under the guidance of Shatananda. During the homeward journey to Ayodhya, another avatar of Vishnu, Parashurama, challenged Rama to combat, on the condition that he was able to string the bow of Vishnu, Sharanga. When Rama obliged him with success, Parashurama acknowledged the former to be a form of Vishnu and departed to perform penance at the mountain Mahendra. The wedding entourage then reached Ayodhya, entering the city amid great fanfare.

According to Vishwamitra, Urmila and Lakshmana equal each other in "grace and heritage". Urmila and Lakshmana had two sons named Angada (not to be confused with the Vanara prince), and Chandraketu. Urmila is described as being as dedicated to Sita as he was to Rama.

=== Exile and war ===
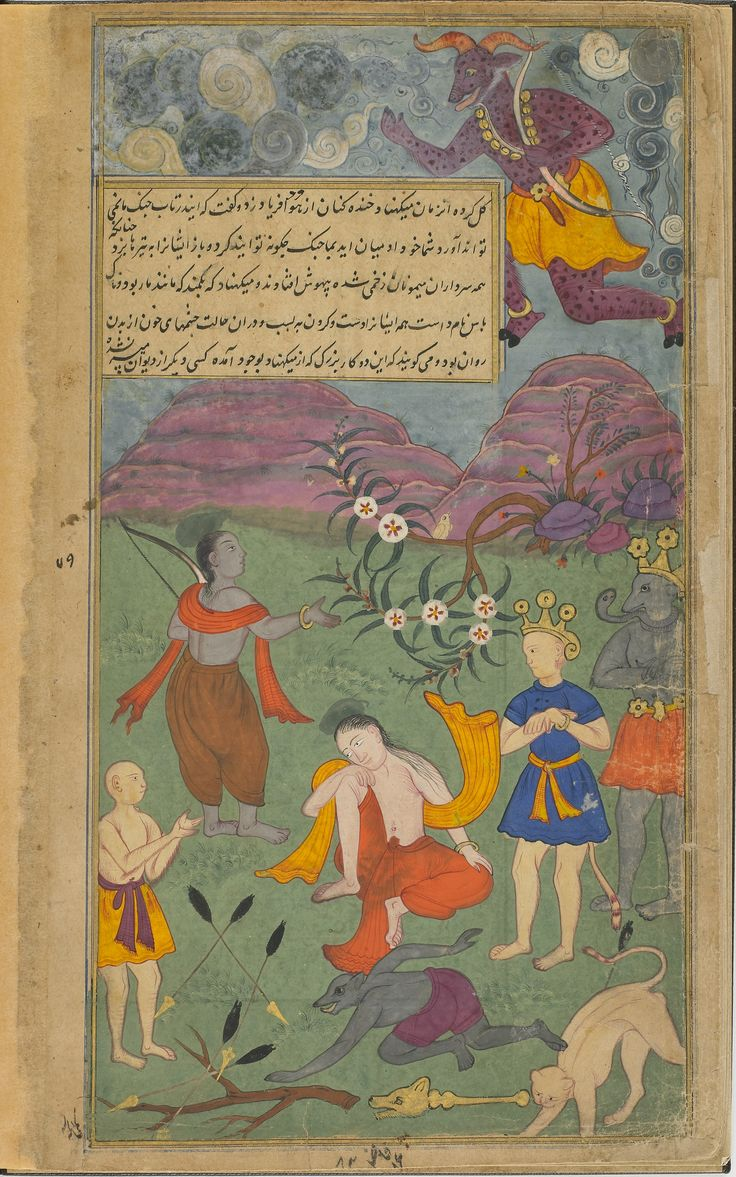
Lakshmana is stricken by the magic arrows of Indrajita a Powerful warrior and Son of Ravana

Lakshmana served Rama and Sita reverently during the exile. In Panchavati, Lakshmana also built a hut for Rama and Sita to live in. Lakshmana cut off Ravana's sister Surpanakha's nose in anger when she tried to seduce Rama and insulted Sita.

On the first night of exile, when Rama and Sita were sleeping, the deity Nidra appeared before Lakshmana and he requested her to offer him the boon of not sleeping for the fourteen years. The goddess asked him that she could grant his wish, but someone else would have to take his place asleep. Lakshmana asked the goddess to enquire his wife Urmila regarding this, who happily accepted the task. Urmila slept continuously for the fourteen years of exile, to complete the sleep of her and her husband's share. Urmila is notable for this unparalleled sacrifice, which is called Urmila Nidra.

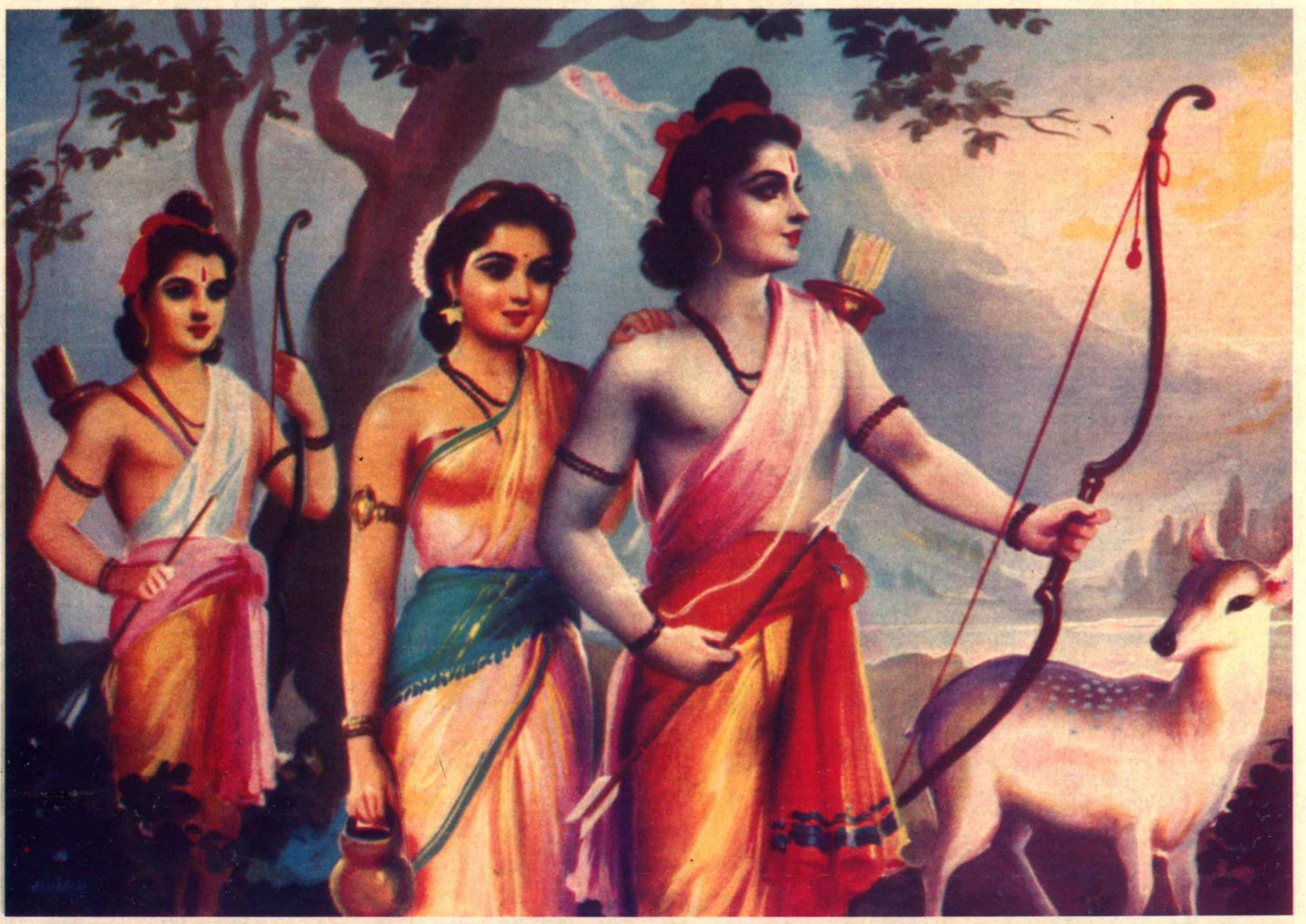
Rama in the exile, with his wife Sita and brother Lakshmana

When Sita asked Rama to fetch a magical golden deer for her, Rama asked Lakshmana to stand guard as he sensed danger and evil. The golden deer was the demon Maricha, who distracted Rama. When Rama killed Maricha, he cried out in Rama's voice for help. Although Lakshmana knew that Rama was invincible and beyond any danger, Sita panicked and frantically ordered Lakshmana to go to Rama's aid immediately. Unable to disobey Sita, Lakshmana drew a perimeter line (Lakshmana Rekha), which Sita must not cross and went in search of Rama. Sita, however, out of compulsion of religious duty and compassion for Ravana, who was disguised as a poor Brahmin, crossed the line to give him alms, following which she was abducted.

Through their search for Sita, Rama and Lakshmana meet Hanuman, who is at the time, a loyal friend and minister of Sugriva. Rama befriends Sugriva and helps him by killing his elder brother Vali, thus regaining the kingdom of Kiṣkindha, in exchange for helping Rāma to recover Sita. Sugriva forgets his promise after the monsoon and this enrages Lakshmana, who goes as Rama’s envoy to remind Sugriva.

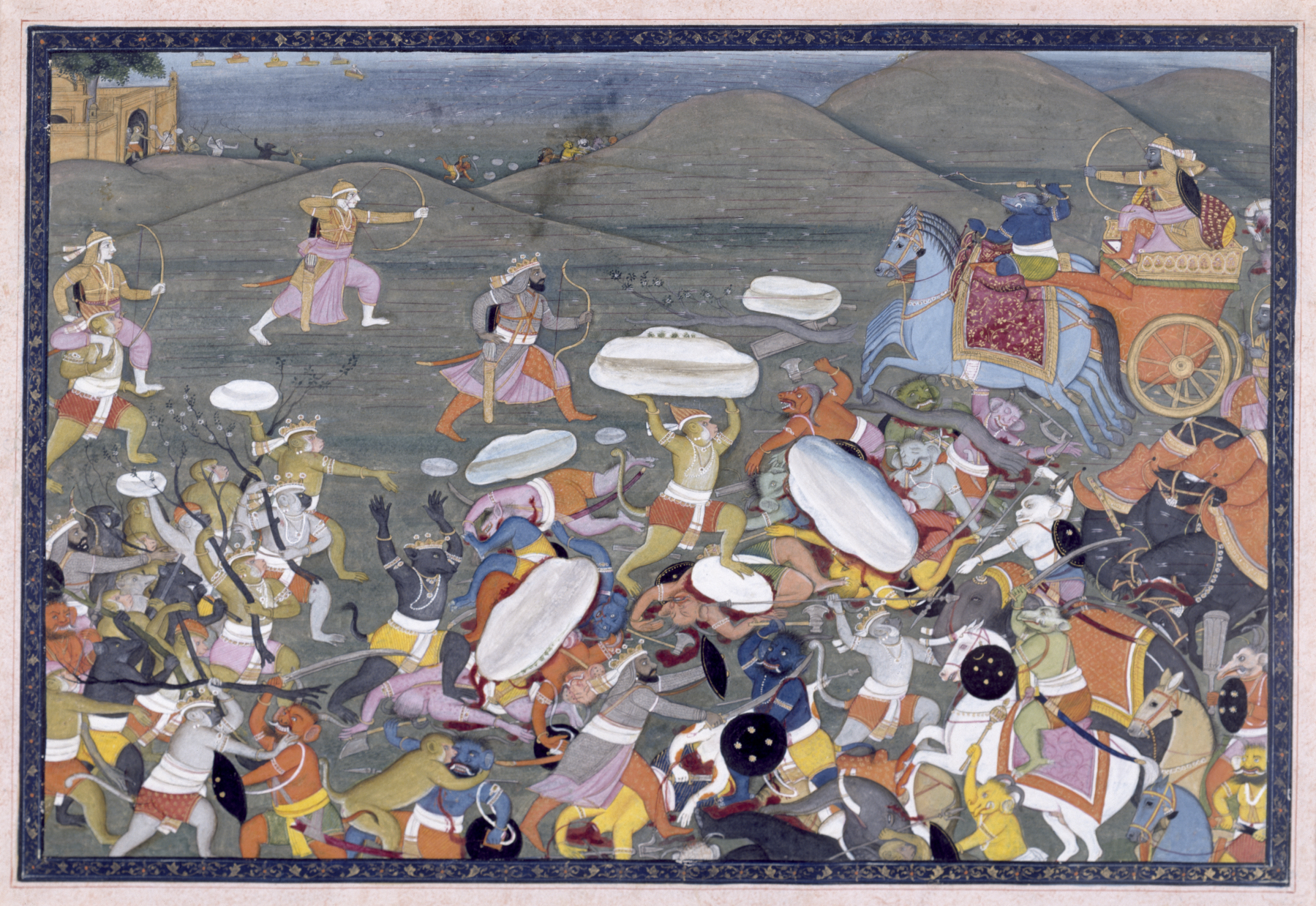
Lakshmana fights Indrajit (also known as Meghanada) during the war

During the war between Rama and Ravana, Meghanada hurls a powerful weapon at Lakshmana and he is mortally wounded. So Hanumana assumes his gigantic form and flies from Lanka to the Himalayas. Upon reaching mountain, Hanuman is unable to identify the herb, sanjeevani, that will cure Lakshmana and so he decides to bring the entire mountain back to Lanka. Post his recovery, Lakshmana killed Indrajit (Meghanada) and Atikaya, who were the sons of Ravana.

=== Post exile ===
After the end of the Lanka war, Rama was crowned King of Kosala, and Bharata became the crown prince. Rama had offered to make Lakshmana the crown prince, but he refused, saying Bharata was elder to him and more deserving of the title. Rama, hearing this, was very pleased and said "O Lakshmana, in this birth, you served me so well and did your duties as a younger brother, so I will do the same in my next birth as your younger brother". Thus, in the next birth, Rama became Krishna and Lakshmana became Balarama, Krishna's elder brother.

Goddess Nidra had told Lakshmana that he would have to go to sleep as soon as the exile ends, so that Urmila could awake. After the exile, Lakshmana went to sleep and Urmila saw the coronation of Rama.

"My brother, I have waited for this grand moment for years and just when I was about to witness my Lord Ram being crowned king, the goddess of sleep, Nidra, reminds me of our agreement and demands that I submit to her this very moment and go to sleep and let Urmila awaken."

— The Princess Who Slept For 14 Years

Lakshmana was the one who left Sita in the forests near sage Valmiki's ashram after she expressed her desire to leave the kingdom. Lakshmana remained loyal to his brother and fought against Rama's sons Lava and Kusha later on.

According to the Uttara Kanda, Lakshmana had ruled over Karupada with Urmila as the queen; which was inherited by his elder son, Angada; whilst Lakshmana's younger son, Chandraketu had inherited Mallya, with its capital Chandrakanti being commissioned by Rama.

=== Renunciation of life ===
Sage Durvasa appeared at Rama's doorstep, and seeing Lakshmana guarding the door, demanded an audience with Rama. At the time, Rama was having a private conversation with Yama. Before the conversation began, Yama gave Rama strict instructions that their dialogue was to remain confidential, and anyone who entered the room was to be relieved of their life. Rama agreed and entrusted Lakshmana with the duty of guarding his door. When Durvasa made his demand, Lakshmana politely refused. The sage grew angry and threatened to curse all of Ayodhya if Lakshmana did not immediately inform Rama of his arrival.

Lakshmana, in a dilemma, decided it would be better that he alone die to save all of Ayodhya from falling under Durvasa's curse and so interrupted Rama's meeting to inform him of the sage's arrival. Durvasa cursed him that he should go to heaven alive. Rama quickly concluded his meeting with Yama and received the sage with due courtesy. In order to fulfil his brother's promise, Lakshmana went to the banks of the river Sarayu, resolved on giving up the world by drowning himself in the Sarayu. From there, Indra removed Lakshmana from the water and took him alive to heaven.

== Belief and assessment ==
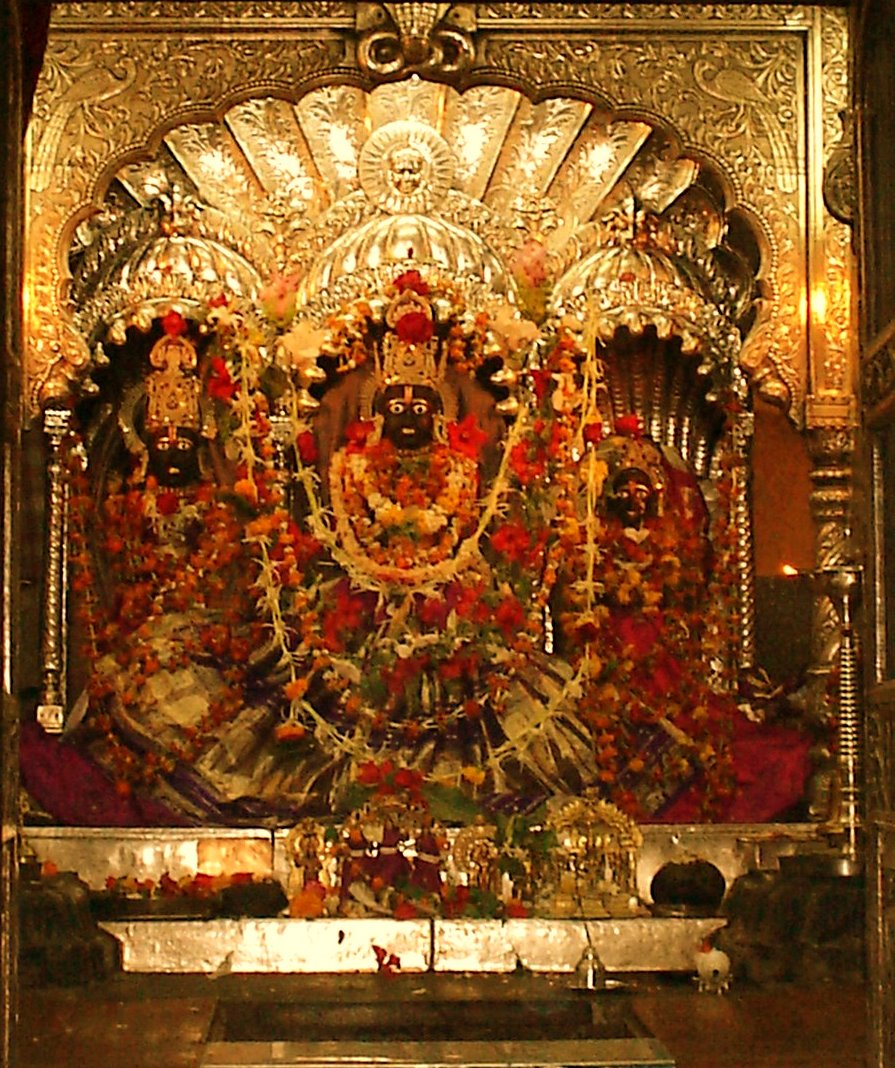
Rama is often worshiped with Lakshmana (left) and Sita on his sides; Kalaram Temple, Nashik

Lakshmana has been described in the Ramayana, as a man with unwavering loyalty, love and commitment to his elder brother, through times of joy and adversity alike. He was also noted for being an obedient son, both to his parents and to his sister-in-law.

Bandhavgarh Fort in Madhya Pradesh (bandhav as brother, garh as fort) was said to have been given by Rama to his brother Lakshmana to keep a watch on Lanka.

Military officers given the rank equivalent of admirals in navies in the Malay Archipelago, including Malaysia and Indonesia, are titled "Lakshmana" (Jawi script: لقسامان) after the figure. There are five ranks with his name, under General/flag officers.

== In other versions ==
=== Jain version ===
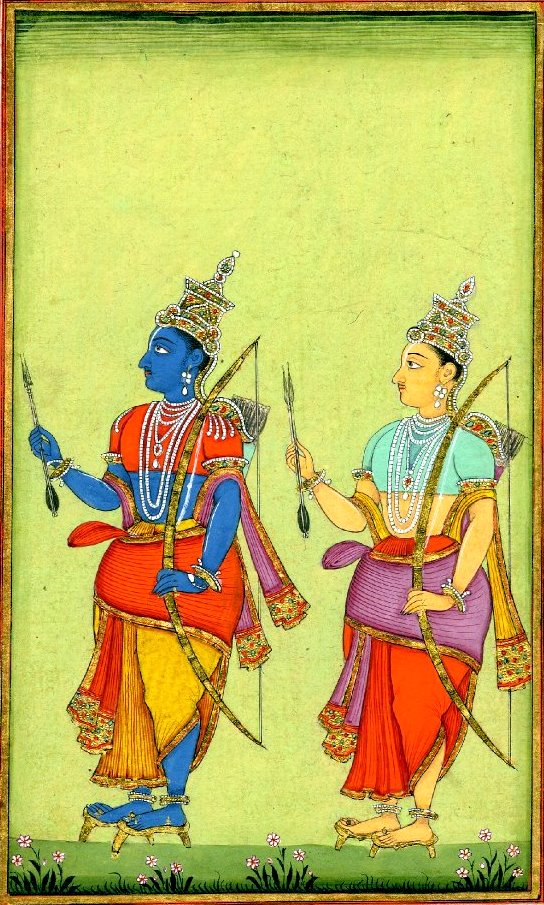
Rama and Lakshmana are the eighth set of Baladeva and Vasudeva according to the Jain universal history

Lakshmana is referred to as Vasudeva in the Jain Ramayana. According to the Jain Ramayana, it was Lakshmana who killed Ravana, not Rama. According to Jain storytelling, Lakshmana had around sixteen thousand wives in which Prithvisundari was his principle consort (in the Hindu epic, he had only one wife Urmila).

=== Gond version ===
Lakshmana is the main protagonist in the Gond Ramayani. In this version, that is set post the Lanka war, Lakshmana goes through agnipravesham and not Sita.

=== Mahaviracharita ===
The Sanskrit play Mahaviracharita by Bhavabhuti is based on the early life of Rama. According to the play, Vishwamitra invites Janaka to attend his sacrifice, but he sends his brother Kushadhvaja and daughters Sita and Urmila, as his delegates. This is the place, where Laxman and Urmila meet for the first time. By the end of the act, Kushadhvaja and Vishwamitra decide to marry Sita and Urmila to Rama and Lakshamana.

== Temples and worship ==
Although Lakshmana is worshipped with Rama in Rama temples, there are some temples dedicated him, where he is worshipped alongside his wife, Urmila.

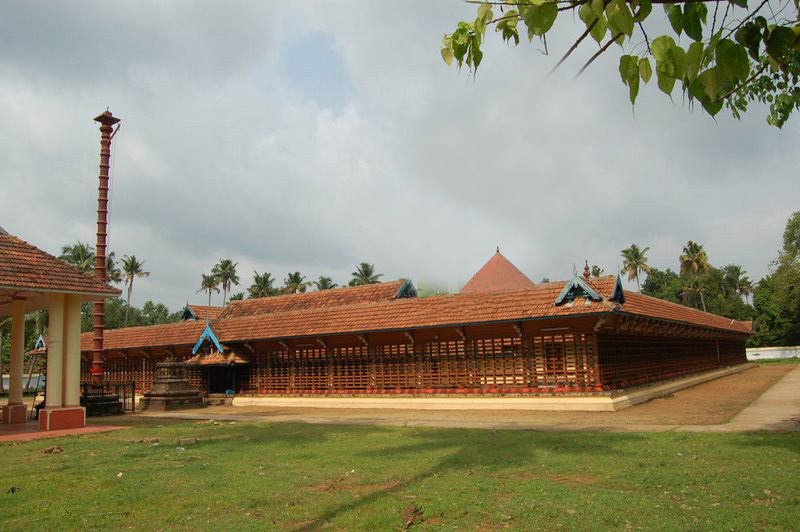
Thirumoozhikkulam Lakshmana Perumal Temple, where Lakshmana is the main deity

- In Bharatpur district of Rajasthan, there is a temple dedicated to Lakshmana and Urmila. The temple was built in 1870 AD by the then ruler Balwant Singh of Bharatpur and is considered as a Royal temple by the royal family of Bharatpur State.
- In Bhind district of Madhya Pradesh, there is another temple dedicated to Lakshmana and Urmila.
- In the Medak district of Telangana, there is a temple called Sri Kalyana Ramachandra Sannadhi that is dedicated to Lakshman and Urmila. This temple is the only one in India that has installed statues of Rama's brothers and their wives.
- In the Ernakulam district of Kerala, there is a temple dedicated to Lakshmana, called Thirumoozhikkulam Lakshmana Perumal Temple.
- In Thrissur district of Kerala, there is a temple called Vilwadrinatha Temple, where Lakshmana is one of the main deity.
- In Kottayam district of Kerala, there is a temple dedicated to Lakshmana and Rama, called the Vennimala Sree Rama Lakshmana Temple.
- In Kottayam district of Kerala, there is a temple dedicated exclusively to Lakshmana, called the Mulakkulam Sree Lakshmana Swami Temple.

== Influence and popular culture ==
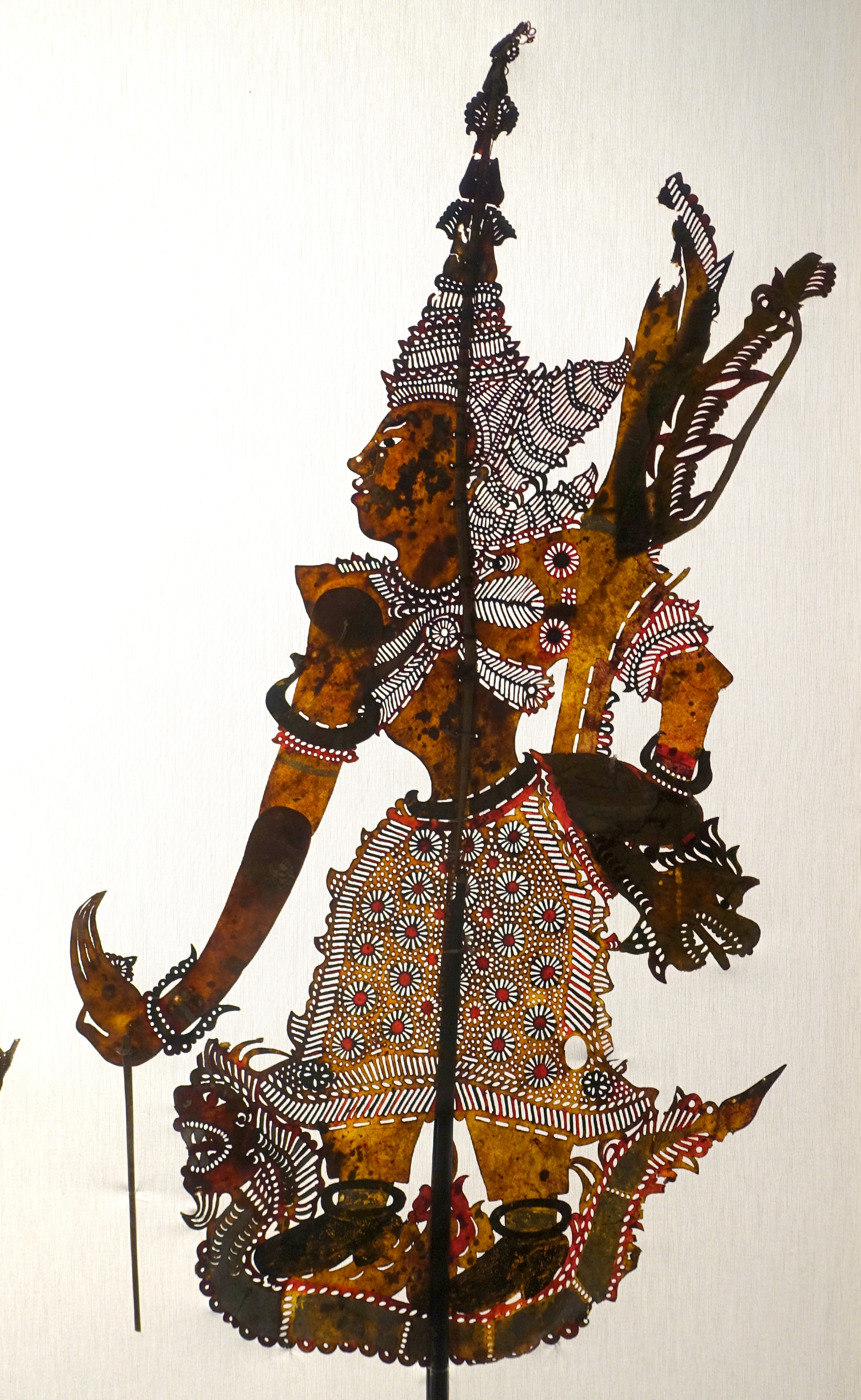
Kelantanese puppet of Laksamana in exhibition at Lisbon's Museum of the Orient

Lakshmana's story and his devotion have inspired "painting, film, novels, poems, TV serials and plays". Prominently, he is depicted in all the adaptations of Ramayana.

=== Films ===
The following people portrayed Lakshmana in the film adaptation of Ramayana.

- Umakant portrayed him in the 1943 Hindi film Ram Rajya.
- P. V. Narasimha Bharathi portrayed him in the 1958 Tamil film Sampoorna Ramayanam.
- Raghavaiah portrayed him in the 1968 Telugu film Veeranjaneya.
- Master Sridhar portrayed him in the 1976 Tamil film Dasavatharam.
- Venkateswarlu portrayed him in the 1977 Malayalam film Kanchana Sita.
- Mishal Varma and Shakti Singh voiced him in the 1992 animated film Ramayana: The Legend of Prince Rama.
- Narayanam Nikhil portrayed him in the 1997 Telugu film Ramayanam.
- Arun Govil portrayed him in the 1997 Hindi film Lav Kush.
- Rishabh Shukla voiced him in the 2010 animated Hindi film Ramayana: The Epic.
- Srikanth portrayed him in the 2011 Telugu film Sri Rama Rajyam.
- Sunny Singh portrayed him in the 2023 Hindi film Adipurush.
- Vansh Pannu portrayed him in the 2024 Hindi film Singham Again.
- Ravi Dubey portrayed him in the 2026 Hindi film, Ramayana: Part 1.

=== Television ===
The following people portrayed Lakshmana in the television adaptation of Ramayana.

- Sunil Lahri portrayed him in the 1987 series Ramayan and the 1998 series Luv Kush.
- Manish Khanna portrayed him in the 1997 series Jai Hanuman.
- Amit Pachori portrayed him in the 2000 series Vishnu Puran.
- Bijay Anand portrayed him in the 2002 series Ramayan.
- Ujjwal Rana portrayed him in the 2006 series Raavan.
- Ankit Arora portrayed him in the 2008 series Ramayan.
- Kunal Verma portrayed him in the 2011 Devon Ke Dev...Mahadev.
- Neil Bhatt portrayed him in the 2012 series Ramayan.
- Aniruddh Singh portrayed him in the 2012 mini-series Ramleela – Ajay Devgn Ke Saath.
- Ankur Verma / Arun Mandola portrayed him in the 2015 series Sankat Mochan Mahabali Hanumaan.
- Karan Suchak portrayed him in the 2015 series Siya Ke Ram.
- Navi Bhangu portrayed him in the 2019 series Ram Siya Ke Luv Kush.
- Priyom Gujjar portrayed him in the 2019 series Shrimad Bhagwat Mahapuran.
- Richard Joel voices him in the 2021 web series The Legend of Hanuman.
- Akshay Dogra portrayed him in the 2021 web series Ramyug.
- Basant Bhatt portrayed him in the 2024 series Shrimad Ramayan.
- Devesh Sharma portrayed him in 2024 DD National series Kakabhushundi Ramayan- Anasuni Kathayein.

==== YouTube ====
- Ankur Vaishnav portrayed him 2024 YouTube series Valmiki Ramayan.

=== Plays ===
The following plays portrayed Lakshmana's story in the theatre adaptation of Ramayana.

- Lakshmana's struggle and separation from wife, was portrayed in the "Laxman-Urmila episode" of the 2023 play, "Prem Ramayan".

=== Books ===
The following novels talks about Lakshmana's life.

- The Sharpest Knife: Lakshmana and His Words of Wisdom by Krishna's Mercy, published in 2011.
- Lakshmana by Prof. T. N. Prabhakar, published in 2019.
- LakshmiLa : The Eternal Love Story by Shubhi Agarwal, published in 2022.
- The Trials of Lakshmana by Story Buddies Play, published in 2024.
