= Mithila (ancient city) =

Lost capital city of the former Kingdom of the Videha

Mithila, also known as Videha, was the capital city of the Kingdom of the Videhas. In the texts of the Vedic scriptures, ancient Indian philosophy and historical documents, it is mentioned as the name of both the kingdom and its capital. It was a prominent center of Sanskrit and Vedic learning.

Its early mentions are found in the Shatapatha Brahmana of the Shukla Yajurveda.

== Location ==
The location of the ancient city of Mithila is disputed with one possibility being the archaeological site of Balirajgarh in present-day Madhubani district, Bihar, India. Other proposals include Sitamarhi in present-day Bihar, India; and Mukhiyapatti of Mukhiyapatti Musharniya rural municipality of Dhanusha in present-day Nepal.

Local legends also claim Janakpur, in present-day Nepal, to be the location of the ancient city. However, no archaeological evidence has been found to support the claim. The city was founded in the early 18th-century but was retrospectively designated as the location of the capital of the Videha kingdom and the birthplace of the Hindu deity Sita. The historical founder of Janakpur is considered to be the ascetic Hindu saint Sannyasi Shurkishordas. The earliest description of Janakpur as a pilgrimage site dates back to 1805. Earlier archaeological evidence of an ancient city's presence has not been found, and there is a lack of evidence to associate the modern-day city of Janakpur with the ancient capital of the Videha kingdom.

== Mythology and legend ==
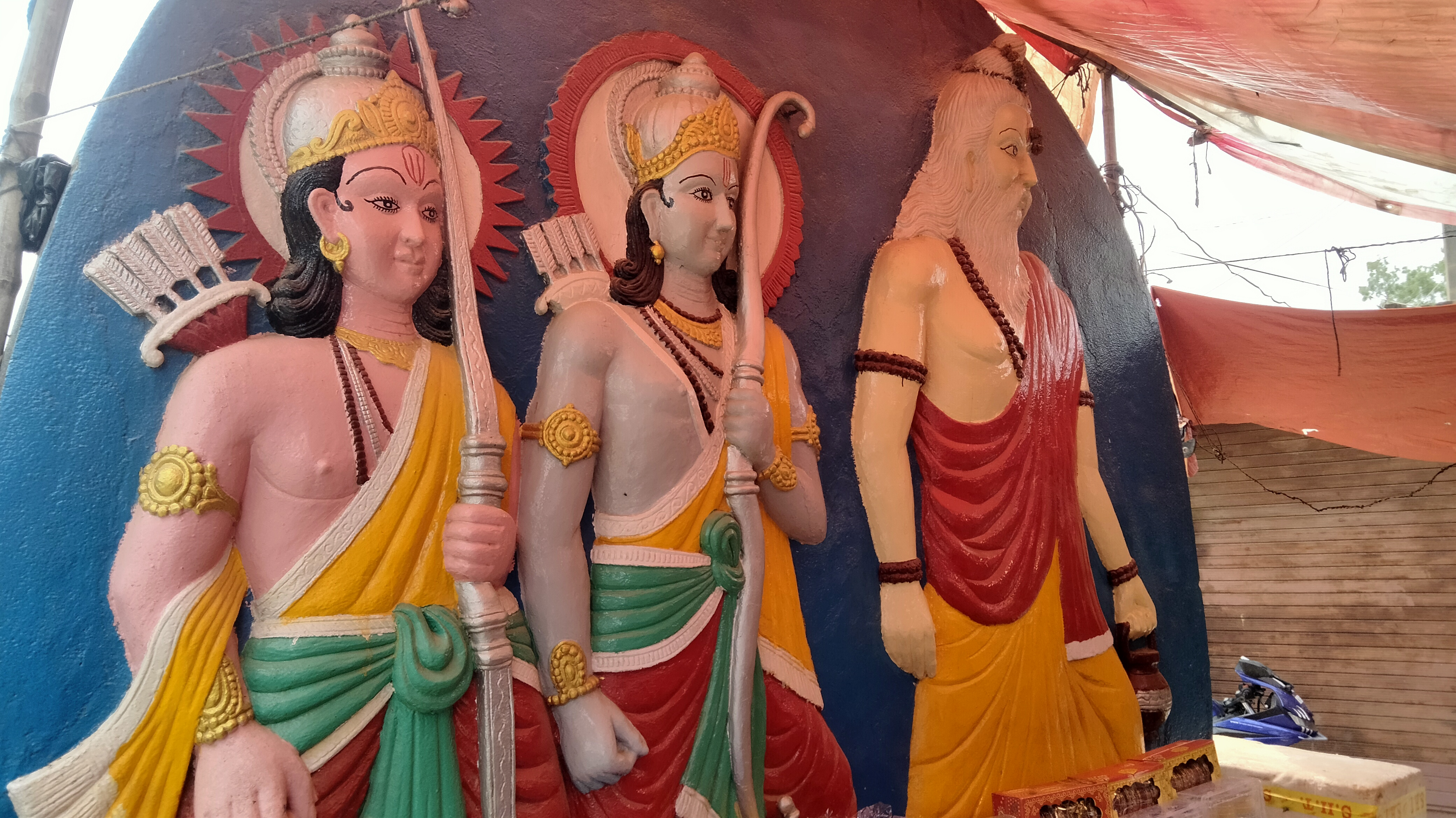
Statue of the Lord Rama's Journey in Mithila. Image captured at Uchchaith village.

In the ancient Indian epic Ramayana, it is described as the royal as well as scholarly court of King Janaka in Mithila. The popular episode Sita-Swayamvara in the epic takes place at the court of King Janaka. The princes Rama and Lakshmana of the Kosala Kingdom, come to the city of Mithila with their teacher Vishwamitra, during the occasion of the Sita-Swayamvara. On this occasion, almost every king and prince in the Indian subcontinent are invited to participate in the competition for bending the divine bow of Shiva, the Pinaka, kept at the court.

== Military system ==
In the Kingdom of Mithila, there was a unique military system. The military was not permitted to practice in the city. The troops of the military were residing at the outskirts of the city. During the period of the King Siradhwaja Janaka, his brother Kushadhvaja was the state's commander-in-chief. He was living at the outskirts of the city with the army for the protection of the kingdom.

== See also ==
- Mithila (region)
- History of the Mithila region
