= Kushadhvaja =

King of Samkasya and brother of Janaka in epic Ramayana

Maharaja of Samkasya
- Predecessor: Sudhanvan
- Born: Mithila
- Spouse: Chandrabhaga
- Issue: Mandavi; Shrutakirti
- House: Videha
- Dynasty: Suryavamsha
- Father: Hrasvaroman Janaka
- Mother: Keikasi
- Religion: Hinduism

Kushadhvaja (Sanskrit: कुशध्वजा IAST: Kuśadhvaja) is the King of Samkasya and the younger brother of Janaka, the King of Mithila, in the Hindu epic Ramayana. He was married to Chandrabhaga and is the father of Mandavi and Shrutakirti.

Kushadhvaja was the army chief of the Mithila Kingdom before becoming the king of Samkashya. He was living at the outskirts of the kingdom with army for the protection of the country.

== Legend ==
=== Birth ===
Kushadhvaja was born to King Hrasvaroman of Mithila and his wife Keikasi. He is the younger brother of Janaka. The Videha kingdom was historically located between east of Gandaki River, west of Mahananda River, north of the Ganga river and south of the Himalayas.

=== Marriage and children ===
Kushadhvaja was married to queen consort Chandrabhaga (Sanskrit: चंद्रभागा). Chandrabhaga first gave birth to Mandavi and later gave birth to his second daughter Shrutakirti. Both his daughters were brought up in Mithila, along with Sita and Urmila. Mandavi was married to Bharata while Shrutakirti was married to Shatrughna, both the younger brothers of Rama.

== King of Samkasya ==
He initially ruled the area around Rajbiraj. His brother Siradhwaja Janaka was the King of Mithila. During his rein the King of Samkasya, called Sudhanvan, attacked Mithila. Janaka killed Sudhanvan in the war, and crowned his brother Kushadhvaja as the King of Samkasya.
