= Devarata Janaka =

- Janaka
- Predecessor: Suketu
- Successor: Brhdratha
- Born: Mithila region
Names
- King Devarata Janaka
- Religion: Sanatana Hinduism

Devarata Janaka (Sanskrit: देवरत जनक) was the sixth descendant of King Nimi in Janaka Dynasty of the ancient Videha Kingdom. He belonged to Ikshwaku descendants. He became the king of Videha Kingdom after his father Suketu. According to Valmiki Ramayana, Devarata Janaka received the famous divine bow of Lord Shiva named as "Pinaka" for its safe-keeping.

== Description ==
According to the texts, from the lifeless body of King Nimi after his death, Mithi was born who became the first King Janaka. Thereafter, King Mithi's son was Udavasu from whom Nandivardhana was born; his son was Suketu (also known as Sukesha) from whom Devarata was born. In Ramayana, Shreedwaja Janaka father of Sita, narrated the story of the divine bow Pinaka at the Swayamvar Sabha of Lord Rama and Goddess Sita in Mithila. He told that at the time of the destruction of Daksha Yagya, Lord Shiva told the Devatas, "In your eagerness to participate in the Yagya, you could not take my share. So I will cut off your precious heads with my bow." Then the Devatas immediately apologized and received his grace. Lord Shiva then gifted them this bow which they later gave to our ancestor Devarata.

In the text Mithila Mahatmya which is a section of larger text Brihadvishnupurana, Mithila has been described as the land of Devarata Janaka in the Shloka number 48.

"देवरात तपोभूमिः शिवतुष्टिकरीमता । यत्र प्राप्तं धनुरत्नं तेन या साम्मवीवभौ"

— Verse 48, Mithila Mahatmya, Brihada Vishnu Purana
