= Bhanumaan Janaka =

King of Videha or Mithila

- King of Mithila
- Predecessor: Shreedhwaja Janaka
- Successor: Shatadhyumn
Regnal name
- Videha Raaj
- House: Janaka Dynasty
- Dynasty: Janaka
- Father: Shreedhwaja Janaka
- Religion: Sanatana Hinduism

Bhanumaan Janaka (Sanskrit: भानुमान जनक) was the king of Videha in the ancient Indian Subcontinent. He ruled the kingdom of Mithila after the king Shreedhwaja Janaka in Ramayana. According to the texts Vishnu Purana and Garuda Purana, Bhanumaan was the son of the king Shreedhwaja Janaka. The name of the son of King Bhanumaan Janaka was Shatadhyumn.

== Description ==
In the texts Vishnu Purana and Garuda Purana, the king Bhanumaan Janaka is mentioned as the son of the king Shreedhwaja Janaka. But according to the other text Bhagavata Purana and Vayu Purana, the king Bhanumaan Janaka is mentioned as the son of Kesidhwaja. The king Kesidhwaja was the son of the king Kritadhwaja and also the descendant of the King Nimi and Mithi.
