= Banaasura =

Royal courtier at the court of King Janaka

- बाणासुर
- Title: Shabhapati

Personal life
- Region: Mithila region

Religious life
- Religion: Hinduism
- Profession: Royal courtier

Religious career
- Based in: Court of King Janaka
- Period in office: Treta Yuga

Banaasura (Sanskrit: बाणासुर) was the Shabhapati of the court of King Janaka during the occasion of Sita Swayamvara Shabha in the Mithila Kingdom. He is known for the dialogues with the Asura king Ravana at the court of King Janaka. The dialogues between Banaasura and Ravana is known as Ravana - Banaasura Samvada. It is very popular in Ramleela drama played in different parts of the Indian subcontinent. There is a special episode for Ravana - Banaasura Samvada in the Ramleela Drama.
