= Dharharwa =

Coordinates: 25°42′N 86°21′E

Dharharwa is a village in Parihar Tehsil in Sitamarhi District in Bihar State, India. In Hindi: धरहरवा

== Geography ==
Dharharwa is 4 km from the main Tehsil town Parihar, 24.9 km from the district city Sitamarhi and 135 km from the state capital Patna. Nearby towns include Sursand (8.5 km), Bajpatti (19.3 km), and Choraut (20.2 km). Nearby villages include Parihar (4 km), Sirsia Bazar, Pipra, Bishanpur (4.8 km), Betaha (4.8 km), Manpaur (5.8 km), Banauli (6.6 km). Other villages in Parihar Tehsil include Baburban, Baya, Machhpakauni, Bherrahiya, Bishanpur and Dhanaha. Other villages in 843324 are Bela, Machhpakauni, Mahadeopatti, Parsa, Indarwa and Parihar. Dharharwa's PIN Code is 843324.

== Mythology ==
According to Hindu mythology, Lord Rama was in Treta Yuga killed Ravana releasing his loving wife, the Goddess Sita. According to hearsay, Dharharwa exists since the birth of Sita. Janak King of Mithila, was advised to plough with his own hands to free the country from a long period of barrenness. Where King Janak held the great plough it was Dharharwa. King Janak ended his ploughing where he found baby Sita in a pot. Where King Janak found Sita in a pot, it has been known as Punaura Dham, Sitamarhi now in Bihar (India). The capital of Raja Janak is Janakpur, known as Janakpur Dham, now in Nepal.

Dhar stands for in local language to take or hold, while Har stands for plough. Since then it has been called Dharharwa. Janakpur Dham is known as the capital of Mithila. Mithila Kingdom was then ruled by King Janak and by his predecessor and successor.

Many people believe the palace of King Janak was in quadrilateral made by four temples of Shiva. They present four temples of Shiva like Jaleshwar, Kalnaneshwar, Kapileshwar and Kshireshwar out of existing Janaki Mandir or Sita Palace lies in Janakpur. Jaleshwar is near Dharharwa.

== Population ==
Population distribution of village Dharharwa as per 'Census of India 2011'

- Male Population 2439
- Female Population 2235
- Total Population 4674
