= Parashara Gita =

Gita texts in Hindu scriptures

Parashar Gita
- पराशर गीता

Information
- Religion: Sanatana Hinduism
- Author: Vedic sage Parashara
- Language: Sanskrit
- Period: Later Vedic period
- Chapters: Nine

Parashar Gita (Sanskrit: पराशर गीता, Romanised: Parāśara-Gītā) also written as Parashara Geeta is the collection of the philosophical dialogues and discourses between the Vedic sage Parashara and King Janaka of Mithila. It is one of the sixty - four Gita texts mentioned in the ancient Indian scriptures.

== Description ==
Parashar Gita is an Indian philosophical text in which the dialogues between the sage Parashara and the King Janaka of Mithila are recorded in the form of Sanskrit literature. It is mentioned in the Shanti Parva section of the text Mahabharata. Parashara Gita is the longest Gita among the Gita texts of the Shanti Parva section in Mahabharata. It is divided into nine chapters. It discusses the superiority of austerity (Tapas) and the power of penance. It also focuses on the importance of karma-sanyasa in the human life. It teaches us, not to perform any acts, which lead to jealousy in other person. There is a shloka regarding it,

परेषां यदसूयेत न तत् कुर्यात् स्वयं नरः । यो ह्यसूयुस्तथा युक्तः सोऽवहासं नियच्छति ॥

— Parashar Gita, Shanti Parva, Mahabharata

The above shloka translates to "A person should not engage in the very actions for which they envy others. An individual who is envious—and who, for this reason, mocks others—should exercise restraint over their mockery."

In the text, the sage Parashara has emphasised on the supreme importance of Dharma over the wealth earned by foul means. According to him, human can achieve salvation even without wealth. He quoted that many ancient sages (Rishis) had realised truth even they were not wealthy.

The Parashar Gita mentions ten Sukrits. They are self-control (dam), forgiveness (kshamaa), patience (driti), brilliance (tez), contentment (Santosh), truthfulness (satyavadita), modesty (Hrī or lajjaluta), non-violence (ahinsha), non-addiction (avyasan) and efficiency (dakshata).
