= Janaka =

King of Videha

- Rajarshi
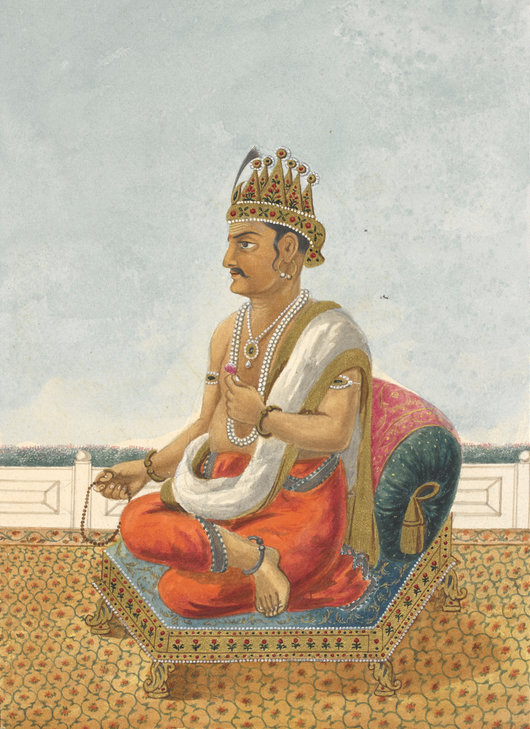
- Portrait of Janaka, c. 1803-1804 CE

Maharaja of Videha
- Born: Mithila, Videha
- House: Videha
- Dynasty: Suryavamsha
- Religion: Hinduism
- Occupation: Samrat
- Descendants of Ikshvaku

Janaka (Sanskrit: जनक, IAST: Janaka) was the title adopted by the Kings of Videha, who ruled from its capital, Mithila. They were the descendants of the King Nimi and his son King Mithi. "King Mithi is considered the first king of Videha to bear the title Janaka.

In the Hindu itihasa Ramayana, Sīradhvaja Janaka is the father of Sita and Urmila.

Janakas are revered as being an ideal example of non-attachment to material possessions. Their interactions with sages and seekers such as Ashtavakra, Parashara and Sulabha are recorded in the ancient texts.

== Lineage of Janaka ==
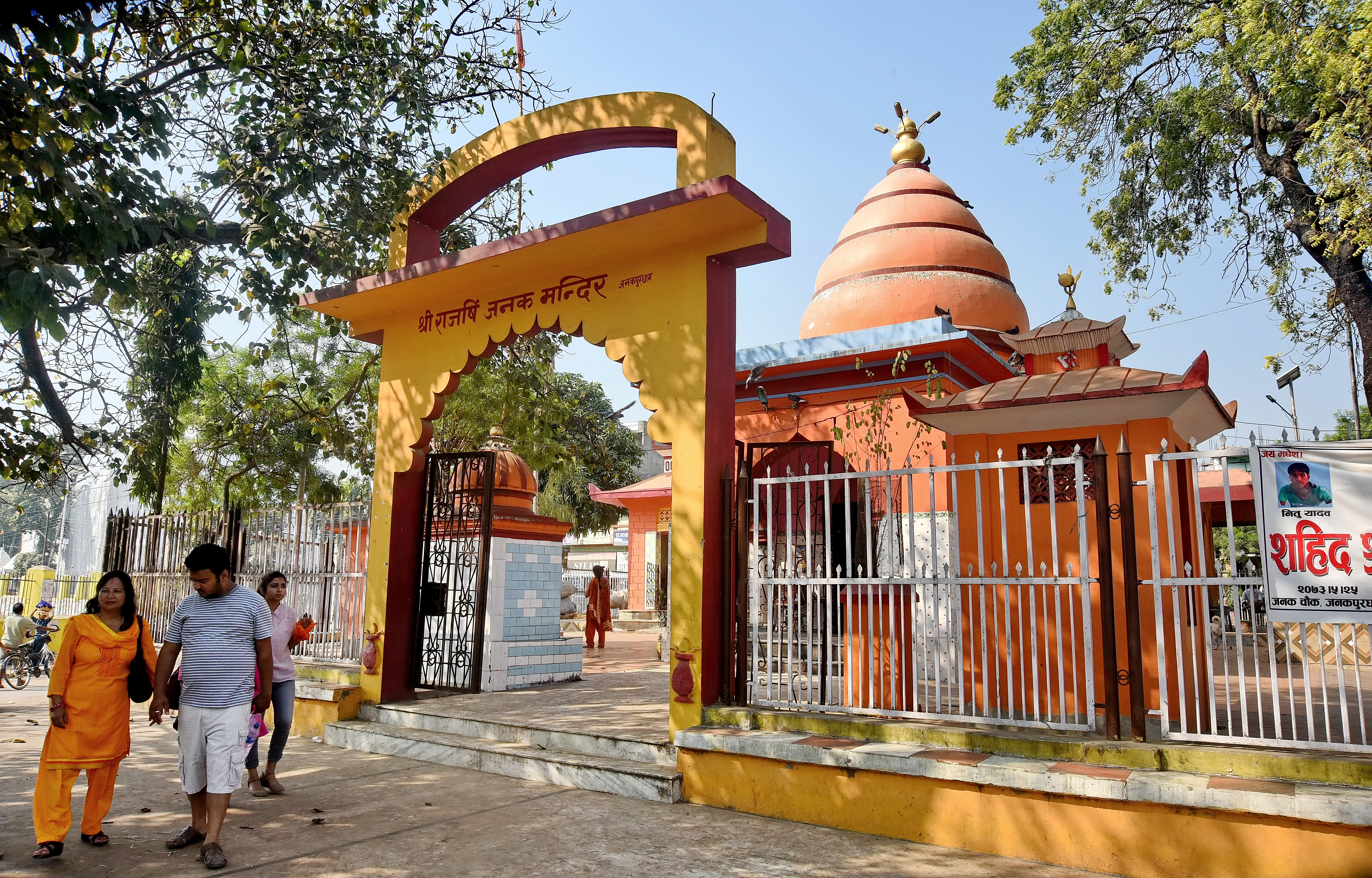
The temple dedicated to King Janaka in his capital city, Janakpur. The temple is known as Shree Rajarshi Janak Mandir.

According to the Vishnu Purana (book IV) and Mithila Mahatma Khand of Brihad Vishnu Purana, King Nimi founded a city named Jayantpur, which later became Janakpur. He was cursed to death by sage Vashishta. As he had no successors, the sages took his lifeless body and churned it. This produced a prince, who was named Mithi because he was produced through manthan (churning). He was also called Videha, "the son of the bodiless" and Janaka, because he was born without a father (janak or pita).

Janakas are believed to be descendants of Vishnu in the following order: Brahmā, Marīci, Kaśyapa, Vivasvān, Vaivasvata, Ikṣvāku, Nimi, Mithi, Udāvasu, Nandivardhana, Suketu, Devarāta, Bṛhadratha, Mahāvīra, Sudhṛti, Dhṛṣṭaketu, Haryaśva, Maru, Pratvantaka, Kīrtiratha, Devamīḍha, Vibudha, Mahīdhraka, Kīrtirāta, Mahāroman, Svarṇaroman, Hrasvaroman, Sīradhvaja (Sita's father), Kuśadhvaja (brother of Sīradhvaja). In this lineage are also kings Dharmadhvaja, Kritadhvaja, Keshidhvaja, Bhanumaan and Shatadhyumn.

One of the best known Janakas is Sīradhvaja, the father of Sita and Urmila.

== Legends of King Janaka (father of Sita) ==
=== Birth and ancestry ===
Sīradhvaja Janaka, was born to King Hrasvaroman of Mithila and his wife Kaikasi. The Videha kingdom was situated historically between the Gandaki River to the west, the Mahananda River to the east, the Himalayas to the north, and the Ganga river to the south. Janaka had a younger brother named Kushadhvaja. Upon ascending to the throne as the King of Mithila, Janaka faced an attack from the King of Samkasya, Sudhanvan. In the ensuing war, Janaka emerged victorious by defeating and killing Sudhanvan, after which he appointed his brother Kushadhvaja as the new King of Samkasya.

=== Marriage and children ===
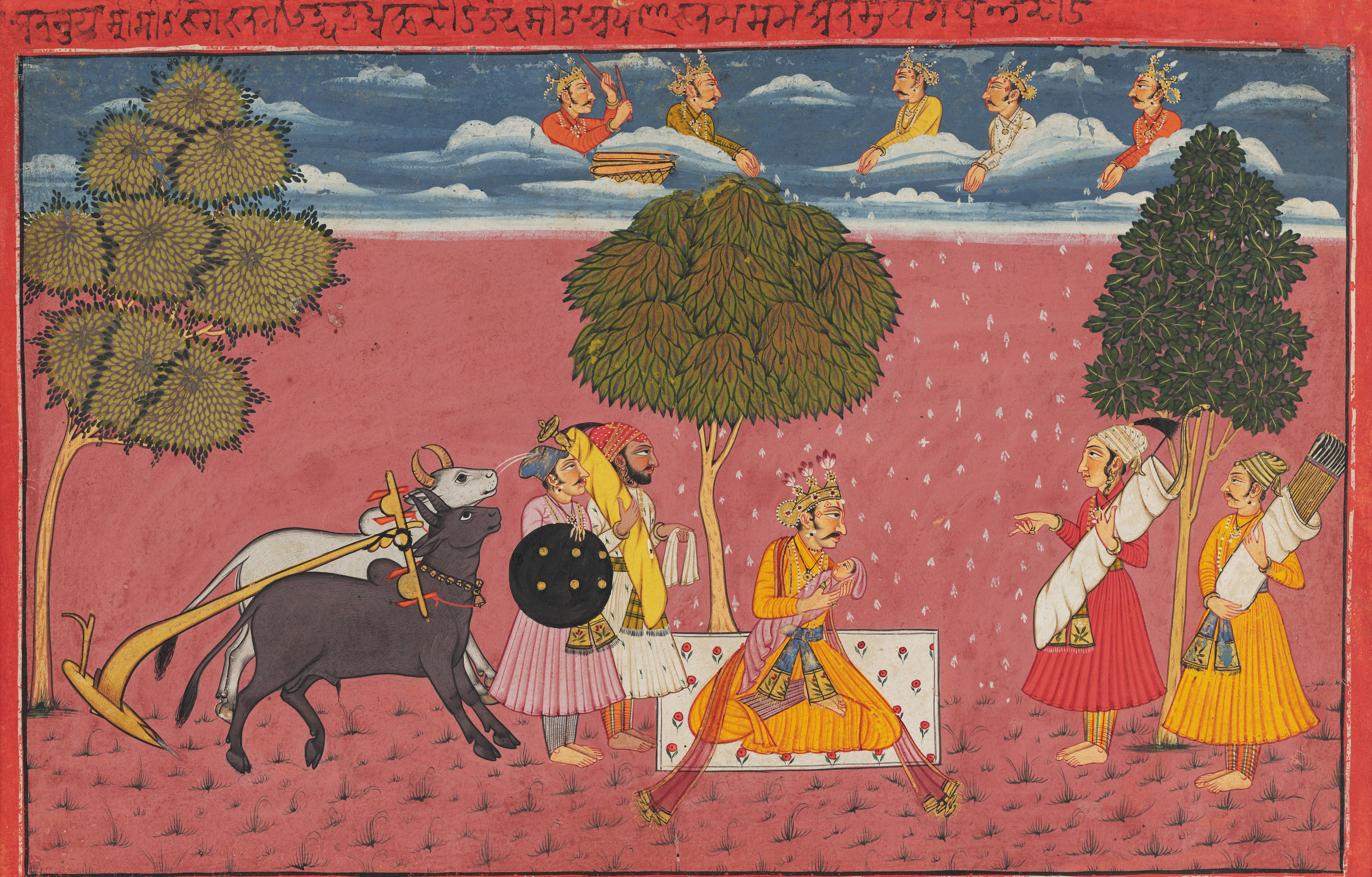
Janaka carrying Sita to Mithila, after he found her while ploughing

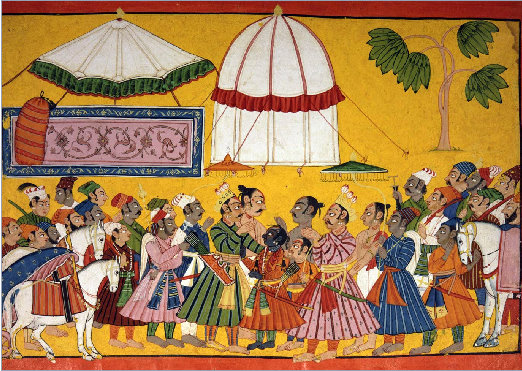
Janaka welcoming Rama and his father Dasharatha to Mithila

Janaka was married to queen Sunayana. According to Ramayana, Janaka and Sunayana found Sita while ploughing as a part of a yagna and adopted her. Sita is considered as an avatar of goddess Lakshmi. Sunayana later gave birth to Urmila on Jaya ekadashi, who is an avatar of goddess Nagalakshmi.

When Sita reached adulthood, Janaka conducted her svayamvara, which was won by Rama. Alongside the wedding of Rama and Sita, Urmila married Rama's younger brother Lakshmana.

=== Role in Ayodhya ===
Janaka accompanied Bharata to Chitrakoot, where Bharata went to persuade Rama, Sita and Lakshmana to return to Ayodhya. After Rama returned from the exile and was then crowned the King of Kosala, Janaka became an important figure in his court. Rama would also take Janaka's advice on many important occasions.

== Establishment of Shivalingas ==
According to legend, King Janaka was a great devotee of Lord Shiva. He established some Shivalingas around the corners of the capital city Janakpur for performing his penance in the ancient Mithila Kingdom. The four major Shivalingas established by him on the four corners of his capital city Janakpur were Kalyaneshwar Mahadev Mandir, Jaleshwar Mahadev Mandir, Kshireshwar Nath Mahadev Mandir and Sapteshwar Nath Mahadev Mandir. Similarly, he is also credited for building the temples Haleshwar Nath Mahadev Mandir at Haleshwar Sthan in Sitamarhi and Kapileshwar Nath Mahadev Mandir at the outskirts of Janakpur Dham.

== Assessment ==
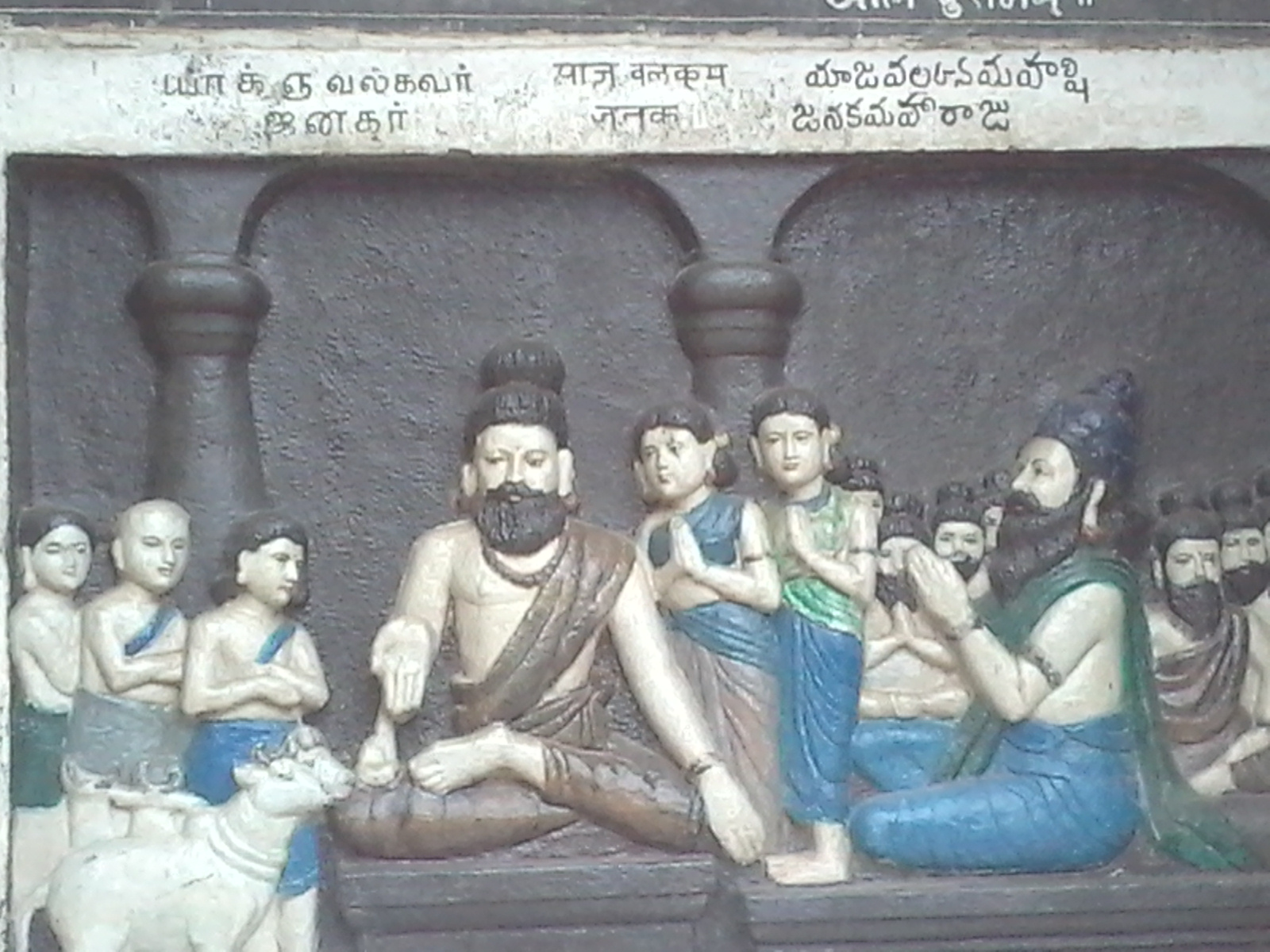
Yajnavalkya teaches Brahma Vidya to King Janaka.

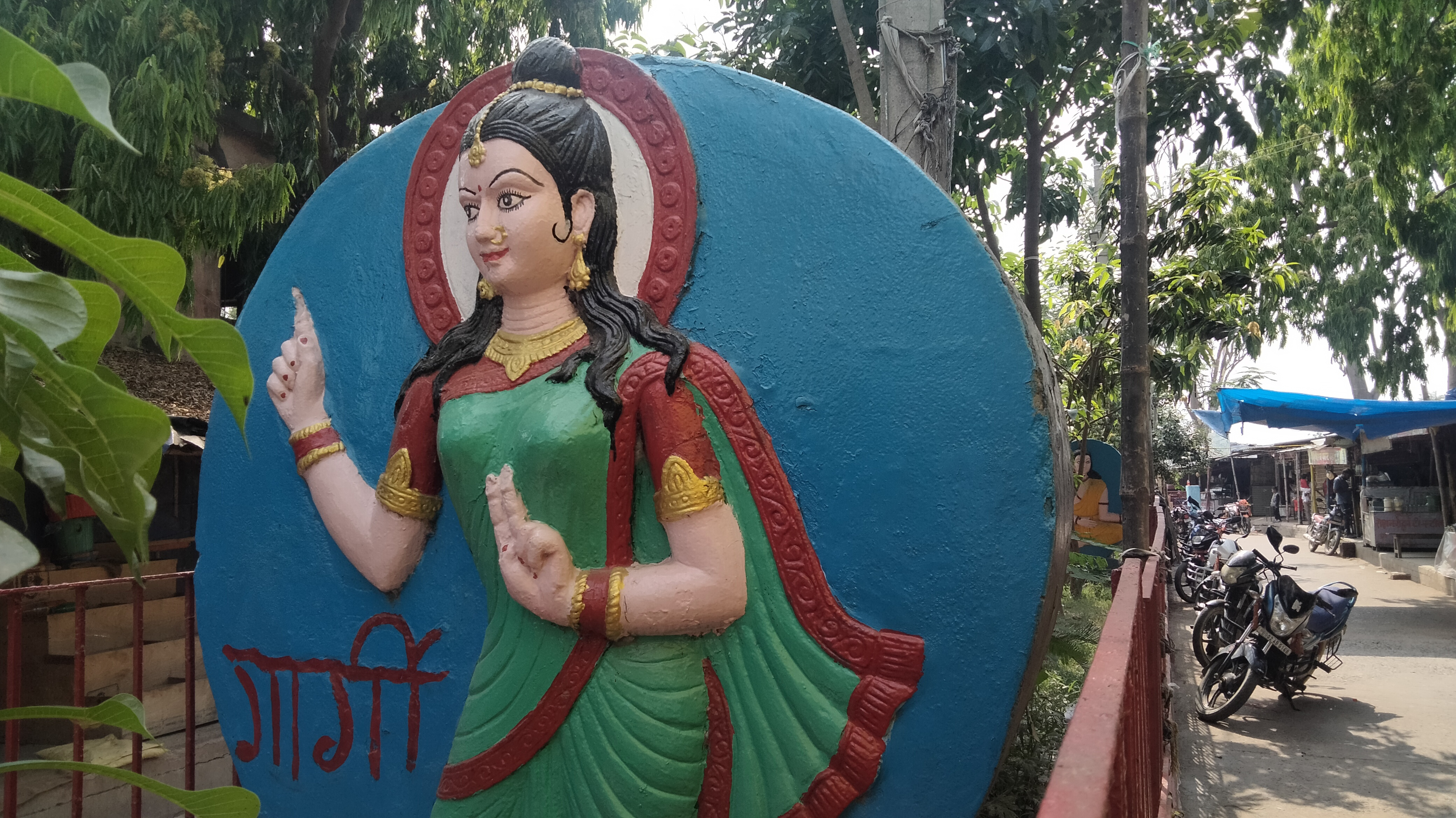
Memorial Statue of the Brahmvadini Gargi Vachaknavi at the Uchchaith Bhagawati Mandir

Late Vedic literature such as Shatapatha Brahmana and Brihadaranyaka Upanishad mention a certain King Janaka (c. 8th or 7th century BCE) as a great philosopher-king of Videha, renowned for his patronage of Vedic culture and philosophy and whose court was an intellectual center for Brahmin sages such as Yajnavalkya, Uddalaka Aruni, and Gargi Vachaknavi. Under his reign, Videha became a dominant political and cultural center of the Indian subcontinent.

== Literature ==
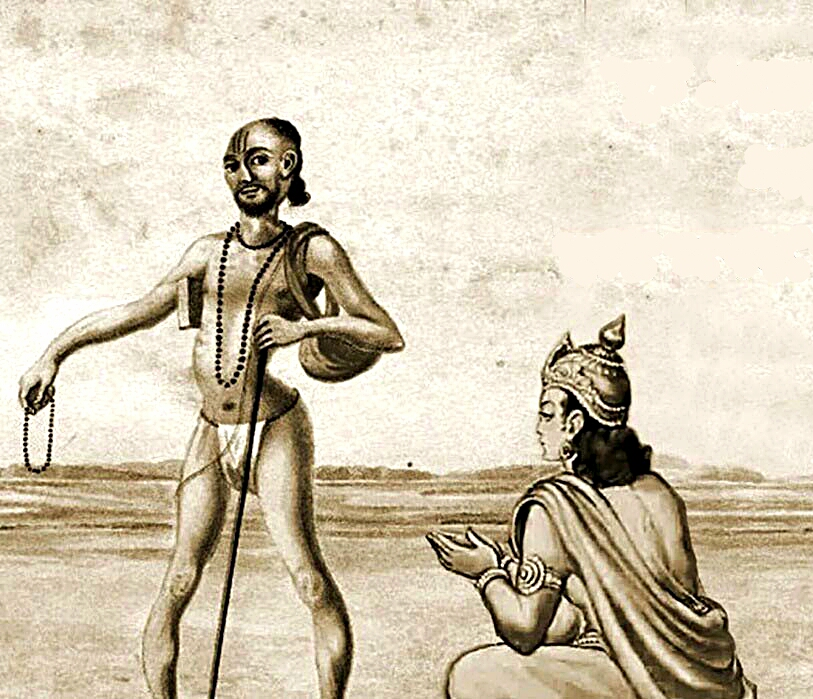
Conversation Between Astavakra and King Janaka

A certain King Janaka's conversation with the sage Ashtavakra is recorded in the Ashtavakra Gita, wherein he is depicted as one who is realised and this was tested by the sage Ashtavakra. Many spiritual teachers have referred to this writing often translating and deducing its meaning. Similarly the philosophical dialogues between the king Janaka and the sage Parashara is recorded as Parashar Gita.

In the Mokshadharma Parva section of the Mahabharata's Shanti Parva (Chapter 308), Bhisma narrates the Sulabhajanaksamvadah, a philosophical debate between king Janaka and female ascetic Sulabha. In the debate, Sulabha talks about one's true self (atma) after Janaka becomes agitated due to Sulabha entering his consciousness, to test his claim of being liberated while being a householder.

== In Buddhism ==
Janaka appears in the Pali Canon as Mahājanaka ("Great Janaka"), a king of Mithila in Videha and a previous birth of the Bodhisatta (the future Gautama Buddha). He is the protagonist of the Mahājanaka Jātaka (Jātaka No. 539), one of the ten major narratives of the Mahānipāta (Great Section) of the Jātaka collection, which exemplifies the perfection of perseverance and energy (viriya-pāramī).

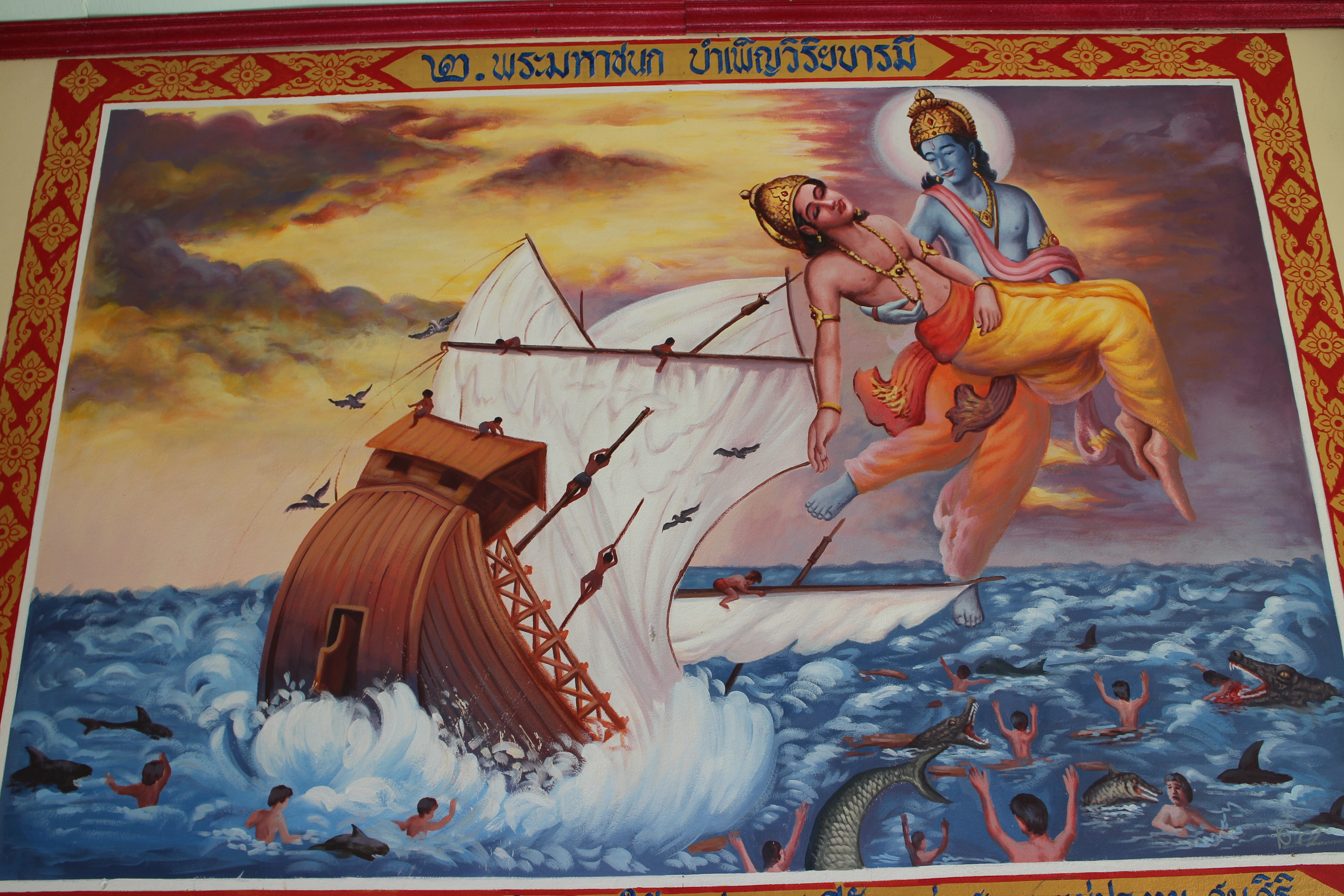
Alternative version showing Janaka's rescue by Vishnu.

According to the narrative, Prince Mahājanaka is born in exile in Campā after his father, King Ariṭṭha-janaka of Mithila, is slain by his usurping brother Polajanaka. Determined to reclaim his ancestral throne, Mahājanaka sets sail on a merchant voyage to Suvaṇṇabhūmi; when the ship is wrecked in a storm, he swims tirelessly across the ocean for seven days without losing hope until he is rescued by the sea goddess Maṇimekhalā, who recognizes his unwavering resolve. Arriving in Mithila shortly after Polajanaka's death, Mahājanaka solves a series of royal riddles, strings a bow requiring the strength of a thousand men, marries Polajanaka's daughter Sīvalī, and rules Videha righteously.

Echoing the famous philosophical verse attributed to King Janaka in the Mahabharata ("Mithilāyāṃ pradīptāyāṃ na me dahyati kiñcana"), Mahājanaka eventually grows disillusioned with worldly attachment after observing two mango trees—one stripped bare for its fruit and the other standing unharmed because it bore none. Renouncing his throne to become an ascetic, he declares the renowned Buddhist verse of detachment: "Truly we live in great bliss, possessing nothing; though Mithila burns, nothing of mine is burned" (preserved also in the Dhammapada, verse 200). Because of its emphasis on perseverance and renunciation, the Mahājanaka Jātaka became widely popular across Theravada Southeast Asia, appearing in temple murals in Burma and Thailand and inspiring King Bhumibol Adulyadej's 1996 modern literary adaptation The Story of Mahajanaka.

== In popular culture ==
=== Films ===
- Mikkilineni portrayed Janaka in the 1991 Telugu film Brahmarshi Viswamitra.
- Murali Mohan portrayed Janaka in the 2011 Telugu film Sri Rama Rajyam.
- Rajiv Kumar portrayed Janaka in the 2026 Hindi film, Ramayana: Part 1.

=== Television ===
- Mulraj Rajda portrayed Janaka in the 1987 series Ramayan and the 1988 series Luv Kush.
- Adarsh Gautam / Pradeep Sharma portrayed Janaka in 2000 series Vishnu Puran
- Pradeep Sharma portrayed Janaka in the 2002 series Ramayan.
- Gyan Prakash portrayed Janaka in the 2008 series Ramayan.
- Mohit Chauhan portrayed Janaka in the 2011 series Devon Ke Dev...Mahadev.
- Radha Krishna Dutta portrayed Janaka in the 2012 series Ramayan.
- Bijay Anand portrayed Janaka in the 2015 series Siya Ke Ram.
- Shahbaz Khan portrayed Janaka in the 2018 series Ram Siya Ke Luv Kush.
- Jatin Sial portrayed Janaka in the 2021 web series Ramyug.
- Jiten Lalwani portrayed Janaka in the 2024 series Shrimad Ramayan.
- Devanand Pathak portrayed Janaka in the 2024 series in Kakabhushundi Ramayan- Anasuni Kathayein

== See also ==
- Kings of Mithila
- Maithils
- Trikaranasuddhi
- Pravahana Jaivali
- Ancient Mithila University

== Sources ==
- Dictionary of Hindu Lord and Legend (ISBN 0-500-51088-1) by Anna Dhallapiccola
- Raychaudhuri, Hemchandra (2006), Political History of Ancient India, Cosmo Publications, ISBN 81-307-0291-6
- Jha, Makhan (1997). Anthropology of Ancient Hindu Kingdoms: A Study in Civilizational Perspective. M.D. Publications Pvt. Ltd. ISBN 978-81-7533-034-4.
