= King Mithi =

Videha King

Mithi
- Janaka
- Predecessor: King Nimi
- Successor: Udāvasu
- Born: Mithi; Mithila region
Names
- King Mithi Janaka
- Dynasty: Ikshvaku dynasty
- Father: King Nimi
- Religion: Sanatana Hinduism
- Legacy -: The first promoter of the Karmakanda ritual in the Pitripaksha festival of Hinduism.; Shraddha Karma for ancestors

Mithi ( Sanskrit: मिथि ) was the king of Videha Kingdom in the ancient Indian Subcontinent. He was the son of the King Nimi. He was the first King Janaka in the Janaka Dynasty of Mithila. The Sanskrit epic text Brihada Vishnu Purana mentions a list of 54 Janakas in the dynasty of the King Mithi, who ascended the royal throne at the court of King Janaka in Mithila.

In the text Mithila Mahatmya, the survived section of the Brihada Vishnu Purana, there is a verse for the salutations to the King Mithi as

मिथिर्येन नमस्यन्ति देशान्तर गताअपि । तेषां भुक्तिश्चमुक्तिश्च जायतेनात्र संशयः ॥

— Verse 71, Mithila Mahatmya

The verse translates to "Even those who have traveled to other countries should bow down to the King Mithi. They undoubtedly attain enjoyment and liberation". It was told by the revered Vedic sage Parashara to his disciple Maitreya in Mithila.

== Mention ==
According to Vishnu Purana and Bhavishya Purana the name “Mithila” is derived from King Mithi, who established the city of Mithilapuri. He was also known as Janaka because he was born out of the body of his father. The title Janaka was later adopted by subsequent kings of Mithila. According to Bal Kand of Valmiki Ramayana, King Mithi had a son named as Udavasu who became successor of the kingdom after him.

== Description ==
The story of the birth of the King Mithi is described in Vishnu Purana, Shrimadbhagwat Purana, Ramayana, Devī Bhāgavata, Matsya Purana etc. King Mithi is considered to be the first promoter of the Karmakanda ritual in Pitripaksha festival. It is said that the King Mithi once donated the things that his father loved to his Guru Vashishtha. Then Guru Vashishtha called this practice of donation as "Divine inspiration" and from here it is believed as the origination of Shraddha Karma for ancestors.

The King Mithi was a great devotee of Lord Shiva. He used to visit the sacred Kailash mountain daily, using his yogic power to see Lord Shiva. Once seeing the trouble faced by the King Mithi while traveling to the Kailash mountain, Lord Shiva gave him a sacred bow to get rid from the trouble of traveling to Kailash. Lord Shiva granted King Mithi a boon, while giving the sacred bow, that seeing the sacred bow would be as fruitful as seeing him.

== Birth ==
According to the sixth chapter of Devi Bhagavata, once the King Nimi was cursed to death by the sage Vashishtha for performing a Yajna in his absence. Then the other sages present there took the lifeless body of Nimi and after performing Yajna rituals and worshipping the gods, they started churning the body. After some time during three parvas, a great, radiant, powerful and accomplished man was born from it. Since he was born by Mathana (churning) he was named Mithi.

According to the legend of Janakpur city, King Mithi was born from the manthan (agitation) of the King Nimi's dead body at the sacred pond of Gangasagar in the city.
