= Videgha Mathava =

Founder King of Videha Kingdom

- King of Videha
- Dynasty: Mathu
- Father: Mathu
- Religion: Sanatana

Videgha Mathava
- Mithila
- Other names: Videgha Madhava
- Abode: Videha
- Texts: Yajurveda, Shatapatha Brahmana
- Region: Videha

Genealogy
- Parents: Mathu (father)
- Dynasty: Mathu

Videgha Mathava (Sanskrit: विदेघ माथव, videgha māthava) was the legendary founder and first king of the Videha kingdom in the ancient Indian subcontinent. Videha is the ancient name of Mithila . Videgha Mathava previously lived on the banks of the holy Sarasvati river with his philosophical teacher Gotama Râhûgana. According to Shatapatha Brahmana, Mathava came to Mithila with his teacher and established the kingdom of Videha.

== Etymology ==
Videgha Mathava is made of two Sanskrit words Videgha and Mathava. According to the commentary of Sayana, Mathava was the name of a son from the King Mathu from Videgha. Similarly Gautama was a son from the Rishi Rahugana. It is believed that the name of the kingdom came to be known as Videha after the tribal name Videgha of Mathava.

== Story of Videgha Mathava ==
The story of Videgha Mathava is narrated in Yajurveda. According to Shatapatha Brahmana, Videgha Mathava migrated from the Sarasvati river valley to the middle Ganga valley. He travelled towards the east with Agni (fire) but stopped at the river Sadanira (Gandak). Then Videgha Mathava asked to Lord Agni that where he abided now. Lord Agni then said that your abode was at the east of the river Sadanira. It is said that Lord Agni ordered Videgha Mathava to establish the new kingdom of "Videha" Lord Agni burned away the vegetation on the other side of the river Sadanira, so that the tribe could settle there. In later times, the Sadanira formed the boundary between the kingdoms of Videha and Koshala . He had taken his tribe to the plains of the Ganges which had dense vegetation in the east. This is the theory of Aryanisation of Videha Kingdom in the eastern India.

== Mentions ==
The story of the establishment of the Videha Kingdom by Videgha Mathava is mentioned in the Vedic verses from 10-17 in the Brahmana 1 of the 4th Adhyaya in the 1st Kanda of the text Shatapatha Brahmana.
