= Ikshvaku =

Indian mythological character

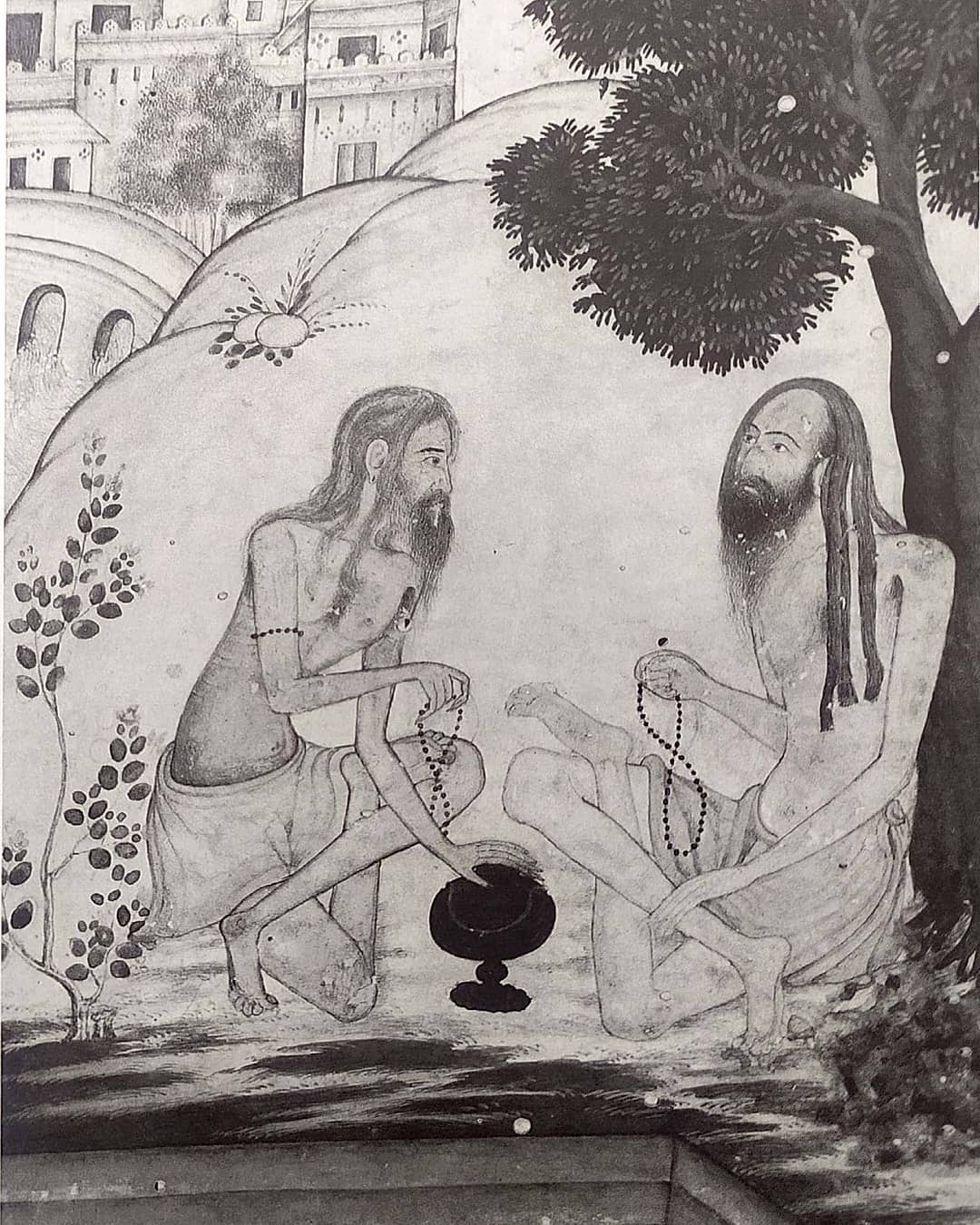
- Painting of Manu and Ikshvaku, attributed to Kesu Das, Yoga Vashisht, 1602
- Venerated in: Hinduism
- Affiliation: Ancestor of Rama
- Successor: Prince Vikukshi
- Texts: Ramayana, Versions of Ramayana (including Ramcharitmanas), Puranas
- Gender: Male

Genealogy
- Parents: Vaivasvata (father); Shraddha (mother)
- Children: • 100 sons (including: Kukshi and Nimi) according to Hinduism • 100 sons (including: Bahubali, Bharata, and Nami) as per Jainism • 2 daughters: Brahmi and Sundari (as per to Hinduism and Jainism)
- Dynasty: Suryavaṃśa (Ikshvaku dynasty) {founder}

Ikshvaku (Sanskrit Ikṣvāku; Pāli: Okkāka) is a legendary king in Indian religions, particularly Hindu and Jain scriptures. In Hinduism, he is described to be the first king of the Kosala Kingdom, and was one of the ten sons of Shraddhadeva Manu, the first man of the Shraddhadeva Manvantara (7th of the 14 in this Kalpa). He was the founder and first king of the Ikshvaku dynasty, also known as the Suryavamsha, in the kingdom of Kosala, which also historically existed in ancient India. He had a hundred sons, among whom the eldest was Vikukshi. Another son of Ikshvaku's, named Nimi, founded the Kingdom of the Videhas. and Rama are also stated to have belonged to the Suryavamsha or Ikshvaku dynasty.

== Origin ==
From Kashyapa, through Aditi, Vivasvan was generated, and from him came Shraddhadeva Manu, who was born from the womb of Sanjna. Shraddhadeva's wife, Shraddha, gave birth to ten sons, including Ikshvaku and Nriga.

There has been debate on Ikshvaku's ethnolinguistic origin. Ikshvaku is first recorded in the Rigveda (10.60.4) in a position of high honour and being associated with the Pancha-jana or "Five Tribes". These Vedic tribes included the Anu, Druhyu, Puru, Turvaśa, and Yadu who were prominent in the Early Vedic Era and associated with the Lunar Dynasty, signifying an Aryan origin. According to E. J. Rapson in The Cambridge History of India, Ikshvaku, his lineage, and the Kingdom of Kosala were certainly Aryan. P. L. Bhargava agrees with the Aryan origin of the lineage presented by Rapson, however argues that Ikshvaku originated near the Saptasindhu in the Early Vedic Period, with the lineage later settling into the Indo-Gangetic Plain and ultimately Kosala following the conquests of the king Bhagiratha. The Sanskrit etymology of Ikshvaku derives from kshava or "sneeze", which relates to his mythological origin in Puranic literature of being born from Manu sneezing.

However other scholars have proposed alternative hypotheses of non-Aryan origin when interpreting the Atharvaveda.

"At the place of the ship's descent at the top of the Himalayas, there resides the vision of immortality from which the Kushta plant was born; which the Ikshwakus previously knew"

— Atharvaveda, 19.39.8–9

This may be a reference to a non-Aryan tribe, residing in the region prior to Manu settling. F. E. Pargiter has equated the Ikshvakus with the Dravidians. According to Franciscus Kuiper, Manfred Mayrhofer and Levman, the Iskvaku is derived from a Munda name: (Note: In the excerpt from pp. 148–149 quoted, Levman (2014) cites: Kuiper, F. B. J. (1991). Aryans in the Rigveda. Amsterdam-Atlanta: Rodopi. p. 7.; Mayrhofer, Manfred (1963). Kurzgefasstes etymologisches Wörterbuch des Altindischen [A Concise Etymological Sanskrit Dictionary] (in German). Vol. 1 and 2 (Bände 1 und 2). Heidelberg: Carl Winter – Universitätsverlag. vol. 1, p. 185; vol. 2, p. 125.; Thomas, Edward J. (1960) [First published 1927]. The life of Buddha as legend and history (1949 3rd rev. ed.). London: Routledge & Kegan Paul. p. 23.)

The founder of the Sakya clan, King Ikṣvāku (Pali: Okkāka) has a Munda name, suggesting that the Sakyas were at least bilingual. Many of the Sakya village names are believed to be non-IA in origin, and the very word for town or city (nagara; cf. the Sakya village Nagakara, the locus of the Cūḷasuññata Sutta) is of Dravidian stock. [pp. 148–149] [...]

The Sakya clan derive their ancestry from King Ikṣvāku, whose name is of Austro-Asiatic Munda origin. [pp. 156–157]

— Levman (2014)

G. S. Ghurye holds that the Ikshvakus were Aryan horsemen and must have arrived in the subcontinent before the Aryans who composed the Rigveda. The Brahmana texts do also state that the Ikshvakus were a line of princes descended from the Purus. The Rigveda mentions that the Purus are one of the Aryan tribes. Mandhatri, an Ikshvaku ruler, is described in the Rigveda to have annihilated the Dasyus, and seeks the help of the Ashvin twins, the divine physicians of the Vedic religion.

== Literature ==
=== Vedic ===
In Rig Veda the name Ikshvaku is mentioned only once as follows:

Him in whose service flourishes Iksvaku, rich and dazzling-bright.
As the Five Tribes that are in heaven.

— Rig Veda (RV), Mandala 10, hymn 60, Verse 4

=== Epic ===
Agastya explains the origin of Ikshvaku to Rama in the Ramayana:

... [Agastya] that foremost of ascetics began to speak thus:

"In ancient times in the golden age, O Rama, the Lord Manu was the ruler of the earth. His son was Ikshvaku, the enhancer of the felicity of his race. Having placed his eldest son, the invincible Ikshvaku on the throne, Manu said:—

'Become the founder of royal dynasties in the world!'

"O Rama, Ikshvaku promised to follow his injunctions and Manu, greatly delighted, added:—

'I am pleased with you, O Noble One, undoubtedly you shalt found a dynasty but, whilst ruling your subjects with firmness, never punish any who is without fault! A punishment meted out to the guilty according to the law is instrumental in conducting a monarch to heaven, therefore, O Long-armed Hero, O Dear Child, exercise extreme care in wielding the sceptre, this is your supreme duty on earth.'

"Having counselled his son repeatedly in this wise, Manu joyfully repaired to the eternal abode of Brahma."

— Valmiki Ramayana, Book VII: Uttara Kanda: Ch. 79, p. 590

The Vishnu Purana states that Ikshvaku emerged from the nostril of Manu when he happened to sneeze. He had a hundred sons, of whom the three most distinguished were Vikukshi, Nimi, and Danda. Fifty of his sons were the kings of the northern nations, while forty-eight of them were princes of the south. During an occasion known as Ashtaka, Ikshvaku wished to perform an ancestral rite, and ordered Vikukshi to bring him flesh suitable for the offering. The prince shot many deer in the forest, and other game, for the rite. Growing exhausted, he ate a hare among his catch and carried the other beasts to his father. Vashistha, the family priest of the dynasty of Ikshvaku, was requested to consecrate the offering. He declared that it was impure, since Vikukshi had eaten a hare among it, making his meal a residue. Vikukshi was abandoned by his father, offended by this act. But after the demise of Ikshvaku, the rule of Bhuloka passed on to Vikukshi, who was succeeded by his son, Puranjaya.

== Jainism ==
In Jain texts, it is mentioned that Tirthankara Rishabhanatha is the same as king Ikshvaku.

Except for 20th Tīrthaṅkara Munisuvrata and 22nd Tīrthaṅkara Neminatha, remaining Tīrthaṅkaras are believed to have been royals of the Ikshvaku (either the main or a branched) lineage.

== See also ==
- Dasharatha
- Dilīpa
- Ikshvaku dynasty
- Kshatriya
- Kusha
- Raghu
- Rama
- Suryavamsha
