= Sita Svayamvara =

Ramayana episode

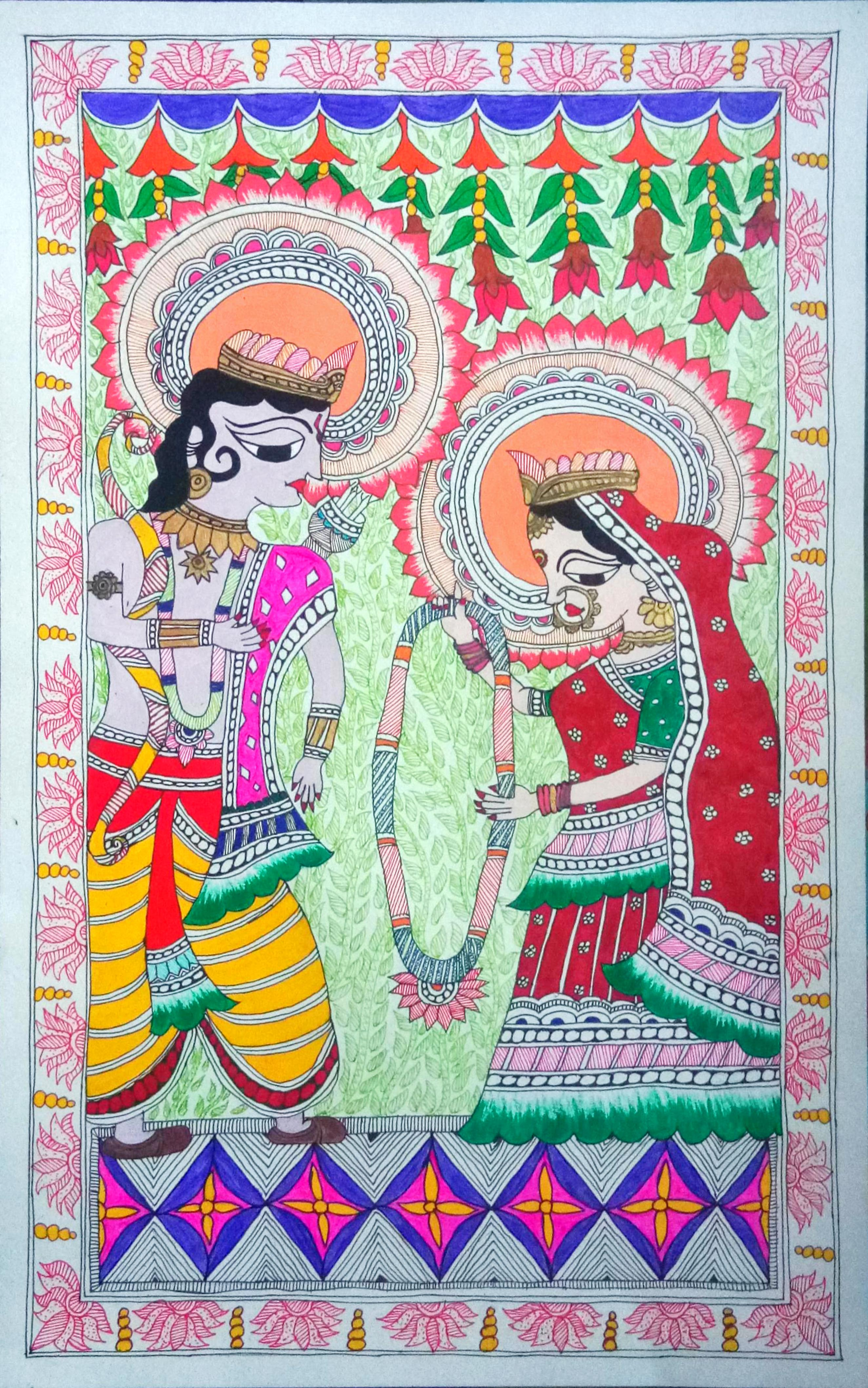
Mithila painting depicting Sita garlanding Rama during her svayamvara.

Sita Svayamvara (Sanskrit: सीतास्वयंवर, romanized: Sītāsvayaṃvara) is the svayamvara event, culminating in the wedding of the deities Rama and Sita, the protagonists of the Hindu epic Ramayana. The event involved a competition among kings in the Indian subcontinent to win the hand of princess Sita of the Mithila Kingdom. The Sita Svayamvara was organised at the court of Sita's father, King Sīradhvaja Janaka, in Mithila.

== Background ==
According to Hindu scriptures including the Ramayana, the divine bow Pinaka of the god Shiva was given to King Devarata Janaka of Mithila for its safe-keeping. The Pinaka was received by Sīradhvaja Janaka in legacy. The bow was so powerful that no one was able to lift it. Once, princess Sita lifted this bow during her childhood. When King Janaka saw Sita lift the divine bow Pinaka, he was impressed by her power and realized she was no ordinary maiden.

King Janaka decided that princess Sita should marry a powerful man who could lift and break the bow. Therefore, when princess Sita grew up and became eligible for marriage, King Janaka organised the Svayamvara Sabha at his court to select a bridegroom for her. In the Svayamvara Sabha, King Janaka stipulated to the participating kings that to become the bridegroom of princess Sita, one had to lift and break the divine bow Pinaka.

== Description ==
In different versions of Ramayana, there are some slight differences in the stories of the Sita Svayamvara. In Ramanand Sagar's Ramayana television series, the Sita Svayamvara is depicted as a single-day event at the court of King Janaka to which all the kings and princes of Aryavarta were invited. According to some scholars and legends, the Sita Svayamvara Sabha was conducted over several days rather than a single day.

According to legend, there is also a story of participation of King Ravana without any invitation. In the story Banasura, the Sabhapati of the assembly asked King Ravana to introduce himself, which made Ravana very angry. The dialogue between King Ravana and Banasura is popularly known as Ravana-Banasura Samavada. Ravana tried to forcefully lift the divine bow of Shiva but failed. He was unable to move the bow even slightly. Princess Sita was genuinely uninterested in choosing Ravana as her life partner. Consequently, Ravana departed after being humiliated by the public present in the assembly. According to the Ramcharitmanas, the reason for Ravana's failure at the Svayamvara Sabha was his pride in his own power. It took love, not power, to uplift the bow. The eligibility and virtues of a person to uplift the divine bow were being kind, soft-spoken, gracious and far from ego. Before and after the King Ravana, many other powerful kings and princes tried to uplift the divine bow but no one was able to uplift the bow by their powers.

=== Arrival of princes Rama and Lakshmana ===
It is said that Vishvamitra received invitation from the King Janaka to come in the Sita Svayamvara Sabha. After receiving the invitation, Vishvamitra, along with his disciples Rama and Lakshmana, traveled to the Kingdom of Mithila. After a few days, they reached the court of King Janaka where the Sita Svayamvara Sabha was being held. In the Svayamvara Sabha, when all the kings and princes became unsuccessful in uplifting the divine bow, then Vishvamitra directed his disciple Rama to uplift the divine bow.

It is said that the prince Rama first bowed to the divine bow Pinaka of Shiva and then tried to lift it with the same ease and humility as princess Sita. His spirit succeeded and he was able to uplift the divine bow easily. After that he broke the bow. Then princess Sita came to prince Rama. She garlanded him with her svayamvara garland and accepted Rama as her life partner.

== Legacy ==
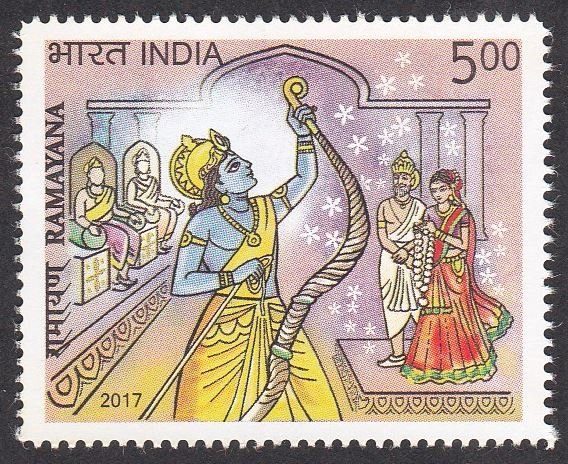
Indian postal stamp showing Rama stringing the divine bow Pinaka at the Sita Svayamvara Sabha in Mithila.

In modern times, the Sita Svayamvara ceremony is still performed in dramas, theaters, and Ramleela productions throughout different parts of the Indian subcontinent. In 2016, Siya Ke Ram television serial of Star Plus made special and grand episodes on the topic Sita Svayamvara. They also launched a 15-day Dhanush Yatra that traveled to 107 major cities across Uttar Pradesh, Gujarat, and Punjab to raise awareness of the popular epic event from the Ramayana.
