= Kapileshwar Temple, Janakpur =

Shiva temple in Janakpur, Nepal

Coordinates: 28.2749°N 83.9557°E

Kapileshwar Temple
- कपिलेश्वरनाथ महादेव मन्दिर
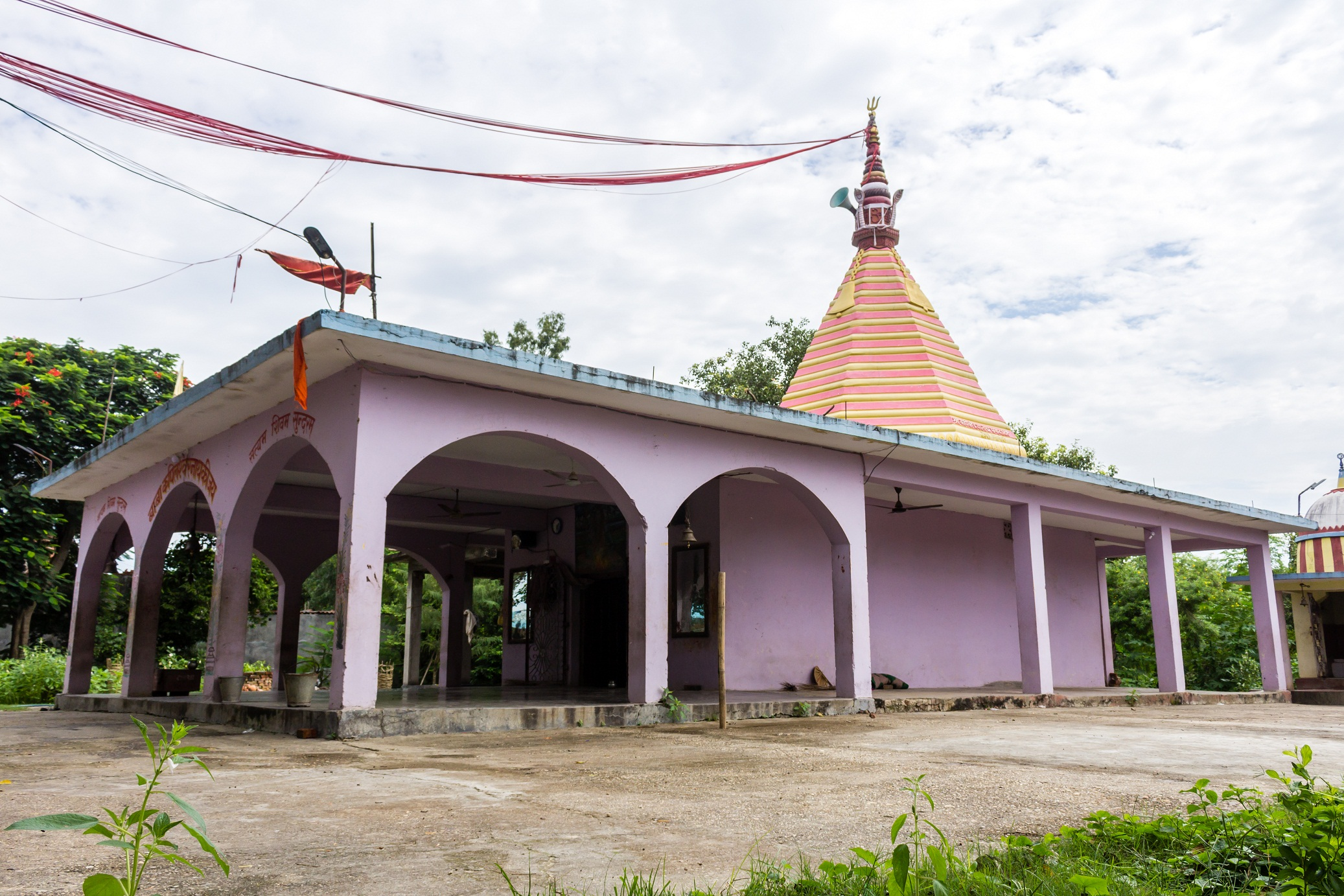

- Location within Nepal

Religion
- Affiliation: Hinduism
- District: Janakpur
- Deity: Shiva

Location
- Country: Nepal
- Interactive map of Kapileshwar Temple

Architecture
- Type: Simrangad
- Creator: King Janak

Kapileshwar Temple (Nepali :कपिलेश्वरनाथ महादेव मन्दिर) is a temple of Lord Shiva situated at Janakpur, Nepal. According to the legend, in Treta Yuga, King Janak had constructed Shiva temples at the four corners of his capital Janakpur. Kaplileshwar temple is said to be one of them. It is believed that the temple was used by Kapil, a Hindu sage, as an Aashram as well, hence the name.

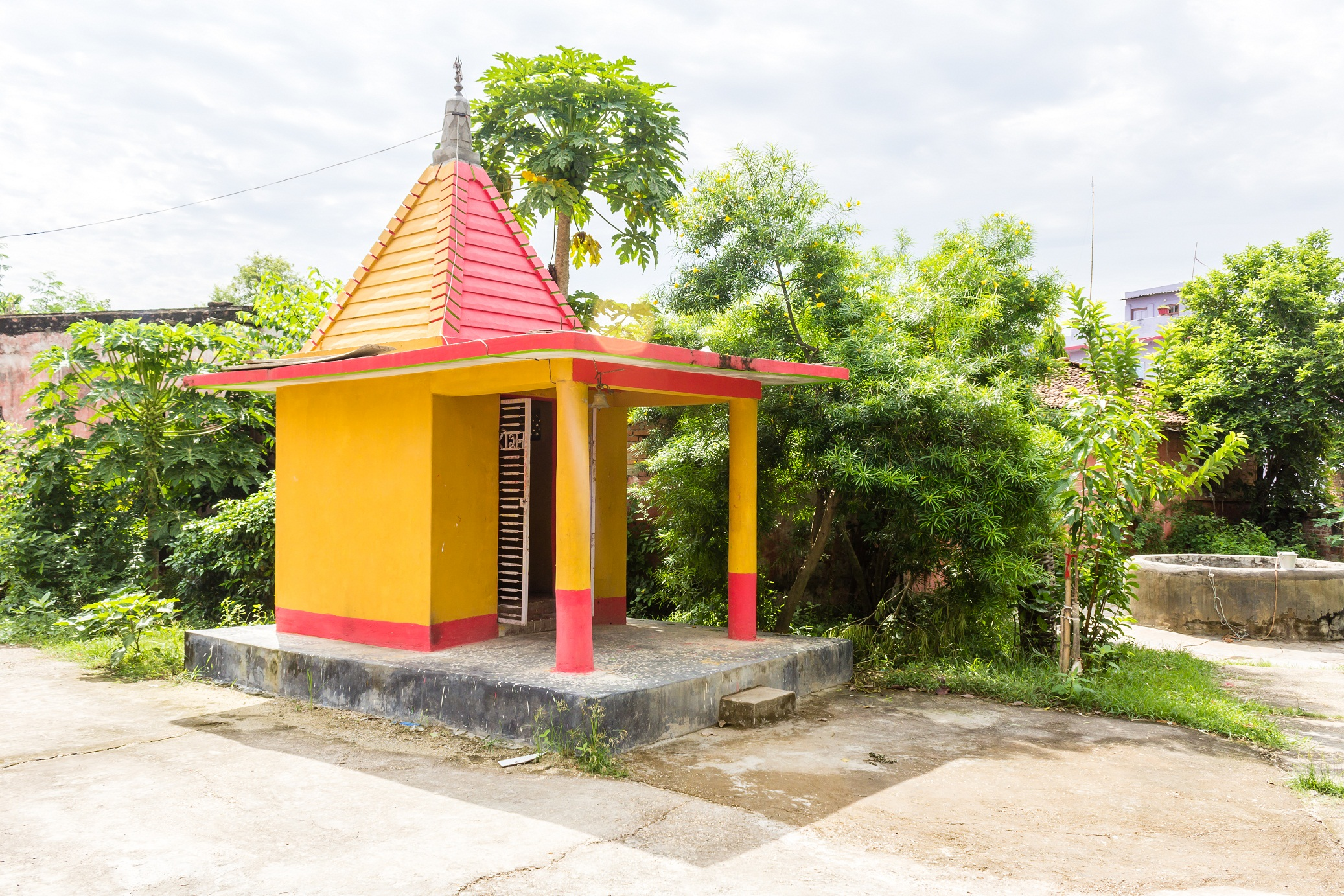

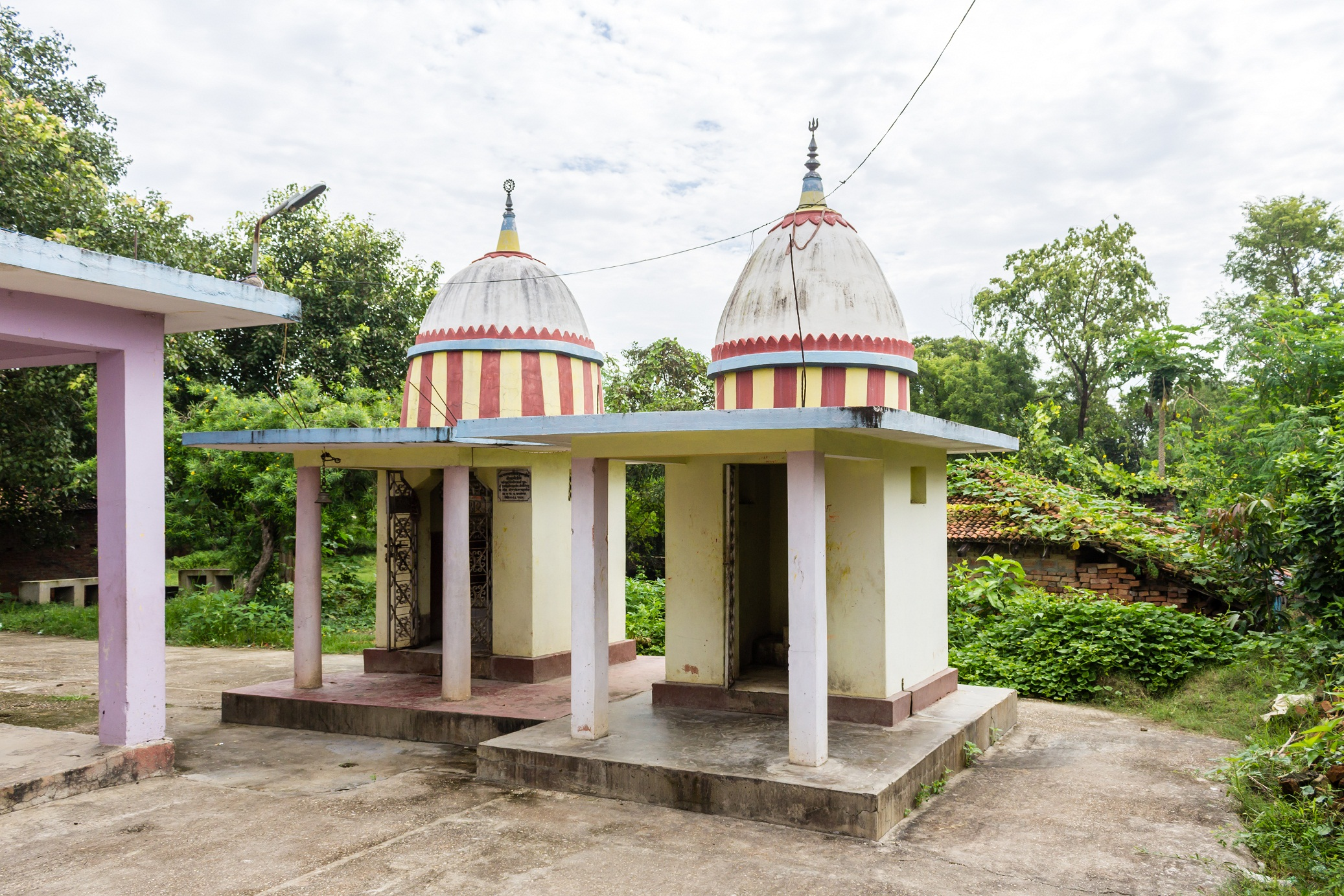
Other temples in the premises.

The temple occupies a land of five Kattha. There are a temples of goddess Santoshi in the North, Ganesh in East, Ram-Janaki in South and Hanuman in the west.

In the earthquake of 1990 BS, the temple was destroyed and the main idols of the temple were stolen. The idols have not been found yet. Initially, the temple was constructed in Simrangad architecture. After the damage in 1990 BS earthquake, Bishunu Giri, a kawariya constructed the temple without any government fund. In 2039 BS, a fund was allocated by government to reconstruct the temple and to reinstate the Shiva linga.

== See also ==
- List of Hindu temples in Nepal
