= Mithila Mahatmya =

Religious text

Information
- Religion: Hinduism
- Language: Sanskrit
- Period: 5th Century AD
- Chapters: 21
- Verses: 284
- Section of Brihadvishnupurana

Mithila Mahatmya (Sanskrit: मिथिला महात्म्य ) is a religious text which describes the glories of the Mithila region. It is a section within the larger Brihadvishnupurana, a revered Sanskrit text.

== Description ==
The Mithila Mahatmya literally translates to "The Glory of Mithila" and refers to texts that extol the virtues and importance of the Mithila region in Hinduism. In the text Mithila Mahatmya, there are dialogues between Maitreya and the sage Parashara. In the dialogues, Maitreyia asked to the sage Parashara about the glories and sacredness of the Mithila region, then he described the glories and sacredness of Mithila, the land between the Ganges and Himalayas, blessed by 15 rivers. It highlights Mithila as the birthplace of Goddess Sita, the wife of Lord Rama, and a place of knowledge and divine favor. The text Mithila Mahatmya also provides the origin of King Mithi (founder of the kingdom of Mithila), the details of the boundary of Mithila, the well known Mithila Madhya Parikrama and geography of the region, etc. Some sources mention the period of the composition of the text Brihadvishnupurana as 5th Century AD. It was later translated in Maithili language and composed in Mithilakshara scripts by Pandit Jata Thakur, possibly during 18 century CE. Later it was translated in Hindi by Dharmnath Sharma and published by Kameshwar Singh Darbhanga Sanskrit University in an edited-revised form based on an old manuscript. Similarly Pandit Lal Das composed his first composition in Maithili language which is an epic poem titled Mithila Mahatmya. In 2021, Dhruv Rai, the associate professor of Yajnavalkya Lakshminarayan Vidyapeeth, Matihani, has translated the text Mithila Mahatmya into Nepali language.

== Contents ==
In the text Mithila Mahatmya, there are twenty one chapters. The total number of shlokas in the text is two hundred eighty four. In the first chapter, from the verses 7 to 11, the spiritual relationship between Lord Rama and Goddess Sita is explained. According to the 7th verse, Lord Rama and Goddess Sita are not different but the same. It declares that the divine couple of Lord Rama and Goddess Sita should be understood one. In the verse, the name of the Goddess Sita is mentioned as Maithili.

रामान्न मैथिली भिन्ना मेथिल्यानरधूत्तमः । द्वयोरैक्यं विजानीया त्तद्वतो नेवरूपतः ।।

— Chapter 1, Verse 7

In the 8th verse, both are declared to be indestructible. Even though, both have different forms, they should be understood as one. It is said that in the mantras of Lord Rama, there exists Goddess Sita and similarly in the mantras of Goddess Sita, there exists Lord Rama.

द्वयोन्नित्यं द्विधारूपं तत्त्वतो नित्यमेकता । राममन्त्रे स्थिता सीता सीता मन्त्र रघूत्तमः ।।

— Verse 8
