= Vishnu Purana =

One of the eighteen Mahapuranas of Hinduism

Information
- Religion: Hinduism
- Author: Vyasa
- Language: Sanskrit
- Period: 5th century CE
- Chapters: 126
- Verses: 6,000

The Vishnu Purana (Sanskrit: विष्णुपुराण, romanised: Viṣṇupurāṇa) is one of the eighteen Mahapuranas, a genre of ancient and medieval texts in Hinduism. It is a primary source for the theology of Vishishtadvaita and other Vaishnava traditions.

Manuscripts of the Vishnu Purana have survived into the modern era in many versions. More than any other major Purana, the Vishnu Purana presents its contents in the Pancalaksana format which includes: Sarga (cosmogony), Pratisarga (cosmology), Vamsa (genealogy of the gods and goddesses, sages, and kings and queens), Manvantara (cosmic cycles), and Vamsanucarita (legends during the times of various kings and queens). Some manuscripts of the text are notable for omitting sections found in other major Puranas, such as those on mahatmyas and pilgrimage guides. However, other versions include chapters on temples and travel guides to sacred pilgrimage sites. The text is also notable as the earliest Purana to have been translated and published—in 1840 CE by the early colonial translator H. H. Wilson—based on manuscripts available at that time. This translation helped shape scholarly assumptions about what Puranas may have been.

The Vishnu Purana is among the shorter Purana texts, with approximately 7,000 verses in extant versions. It primarily centers around the Hindu deity Vishnu and his avatarasas such as Rama and Krishna, but it also praises Brahma and Shiva while stating that they are dependent on Vishnu. While H. H. Wilson characterized the text's theology as pantheistic, Indian philosophical traditions and modern scholars analyze its theology as panentheistic or non-dual with attributes. This affirms that Vishnu is both transcendent as both the supreme Brahman and immanent as the material cause of the universe.

Like all major Puranas, the Vishnu Purana attributes its authorship to sage Vyasa. Estimates of its composition range from 400 BCE to 900 CE. The text was likely composed and rewritten in layers over time, with possible roots in ancient 1st-millennium BCE texts that have not survived into the modern era. The Padma Purana categorizes the Vishnu Purana as a Sattva Purana (a Purana representing goodness and purity).

== Date of composition ==
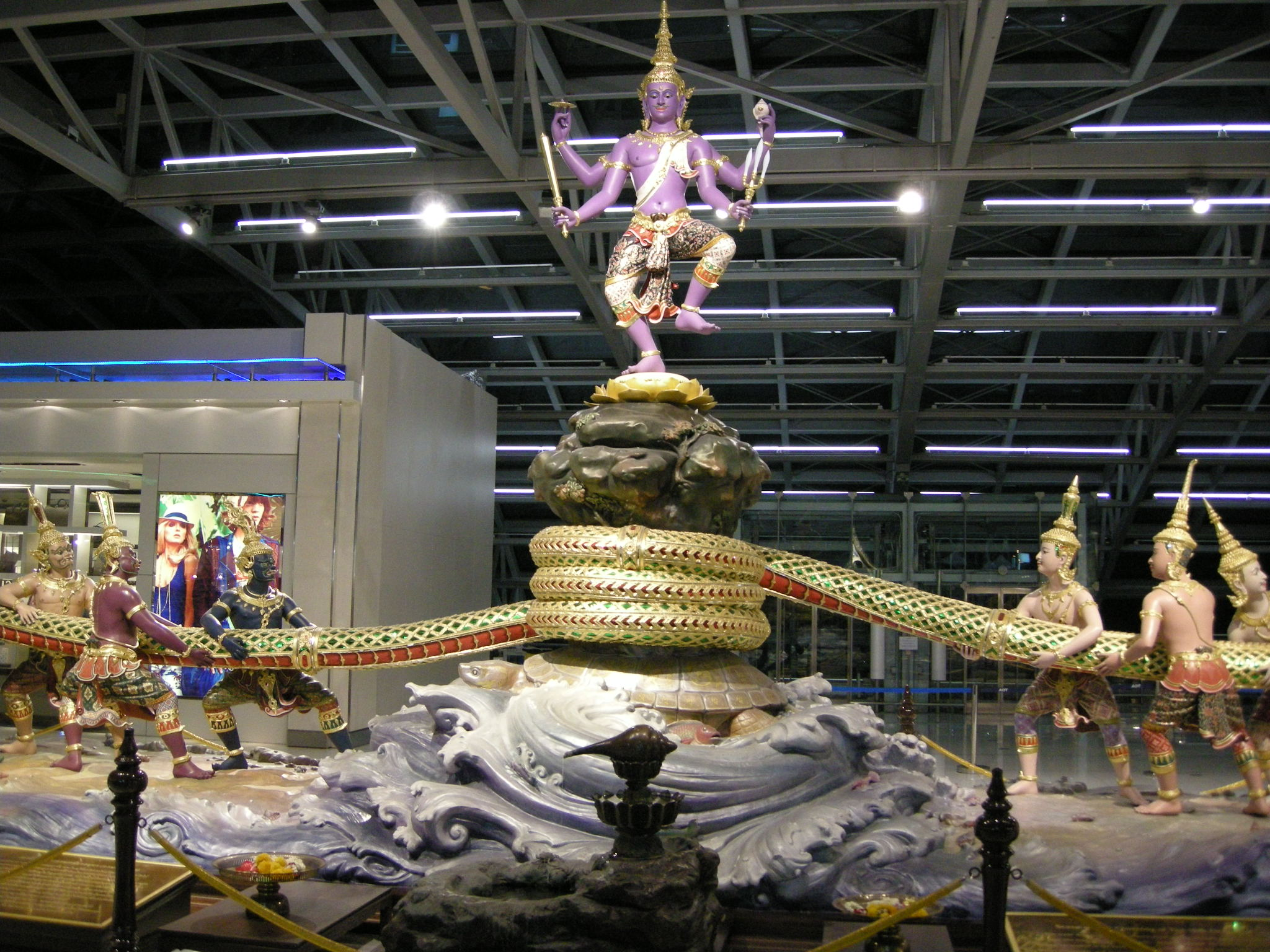
Samudra Manthanam depicted in above sculpture, is described in the Vishnu Purana. Suvarnabhumi Airport, Bangkok

The composition date of Vishnu Purana is unknown and contested among scholars, with estimates varying widely. Proposed dates for the earliest version (Note: This is not the version that has survived into the modern era. The estimates for earliest version are based on the analysis of the content, events described, literary style, references to other Indian texts within this Purana.) of the Vishnu Purana include the following scholarly estimates:

- Horace Hayman Wilson (1864): Suggested 11th-century composition, despite acknowledging the traditional belief that it was a 1st-millennium BCE text with roots in Vedic literature.
- Vincent Smith (1908): 400–300 BCE,
- Chintaman Vinayak Vaidya (1925): Approximately 9th century.
- Moriz Winternitz (1932): possibly early 1st millennium, but states Ludo Rocher, he added that "it is no more possible to assign a definite date to the Vishnu Purana than it is for any other Purana".
- Rajendra Chandra Hazra (1940): 275–325 CE
- Ramachandra Dikshitar (1951): 700–300 BCE,
- S. N. Roy (1968): after the 9th century.
- Wendy Doniger (1988): c. 450 CE.

According to the scholar Ludo Rocher, the "date of the Vishnu Purana is as contested as that of any other Purana". References to the Vishnu Purana in texts such as the Brihadvishnu, whose dates are better established, suggest that a version of the text existed by approximately 1000 CE. However, it is unclear to what extent the surviving manuscripts reflect revisions made during the 2nd millennium CE. Like all Puranas, the Vishnu Purana has a complicated chronology. Scholars Cornelia Dimmitt and J. A. B. van Buitenen state that each of the Puranas, including the Vishnu Purana, is encyclopedic in style, making it difficult to determine when, where, why and by whom they were written:

As they exist today, the Puranas are a stratified literature. Each titled work consists of material that has grown by numerous accretions in successive historical eras. Thus, no Purana has a single date of composition. It is as if they were libraries to which new volumes have been continuously added, not necessarily at the end of the shelf, but randomly.

— Cornelia Dimmitt and J.A.B. van Buitenen, Classical Hindu Mythology: A Reader in the Sanskrit Puranas

Many extant manuscripts were written on palm leaves or copied during the British colonial era in India, some as late as the 19th century. According to Ludo Rocher, scholarship on the Vishnu Purana and other Puranas has been affected by cases of forgery. Liberties in the transmission of Puranas were common, and those who copied older manuscripts replaced words or added new content to align with the theories that the colonial scholars sought to publish.

== Structure ==
The surviving text comprises six amsas (parts) and 126 adhyayas (chapters). The first part has 22 chapters, the second part has 16 chapters, the third part has 18 chapters and the fourth part has 24 chapters. The fifth and the sixth parts are the longest and the shortest part of the text, comprising 38 and 8 chapters respectively.

The textual tradition holds that the original Vishnu Purana contained 23,000 verses, but surviving manuscripts contain only about one-third of that number, approximately 7,000 verses. The text is composed in metric verses (sloka), in which each verse contains exactly 32 syllables, though 16 syllables per verse may follow a free style according to ancient literary standards.

The text closely adheres to the classical pañcalakṣaṇa (five characteristics) criteria that define a traditional Purana: sarga (primary creation), pratisarga (secondary creation and dissolution), vaṃśa (genealogy of deities, sages, and kings), manvantara (Cosmic epochs governed by successive Manus), and vaṃśānucarita (histories and deeds of solar and lunar dynasties). According to Dimmitt and van Buitenen, this format is rare; just 2% of the known Puranic literature corpus focuses on these five Pancalaksana items, while approximately 98% covers a diverse range of encyclopedic topics.

== Contents ==
Who Is Vishnu?

Out Of Vishnu This Universe Has Arisen,
In Him Its Exists,
He Is The One Who Governs Its Existence And Destruction,
He Is The Universe.

— Vishnu Purana, 1.14

The Vishnu Purana opens as a conversation between the sage Maitreya and his Guru, Parashara, with the sage asking, "What is the nature of this universe and everything that is in it?"

=== First Amsa: Cosmology ===
The first Amsha (part) of the Vishnu Purana presents cosmology, addressing the creation, maintenance and destruction of the universe. According to Rocher, the mythology is interwoven with the evolutionary theories of Samkhya school of Hindu philosophy.

In this text, the deity Vishnu is presented as the central element of cosmology, in contrast to some other Puranas that emphasize Shiva, Brahma, or the Tridevi. Reverence and worship of Vishnu as a means to liberation are described in 22 chapters of the first part, along with the extensive use of Vishnu's synonymous names, including Hari, Janardana, Madhava, Achyuta, Hrishikesha. Chapters 1.16 through 1.20 presents the legend of Prahlada, a devotee of Vishnu, and his persecution by his father, the demon king Hiranyakashipu. In the narrative, Prahlada is ultimately saved when Vishnu in the form of Narasimha, kills Hiranyakashipu. This story also appears in other Puranas.

According to Wilson's translation, Vishnu is described in the first book as all elements, all matter in the world, the entire universe, all living beings, as well as Atman (inner self, essence) within every living being.The text further identifies Vishnu with nature, intellect, ego, mind, senses, ignorance, wisdom, the four Vedas, and "all that is and all that is not".

=== Second Amsa: Earth ===
The second part of the text describes the earth, including the seven continents and seven oceans. It discusses Mount Meru, Mount Mandara and other major mountains, as well as Bharatavarsha (Literally, "the country of Bharata"), along with its numerous rivers and diverse peoples. The seven continents are named Jambu, Plaksha, Salmala, Kusha, Krauncha, Saka, and Pushkara, each surrounded by different types of oceans (saltwater, freshwater, wine, sugarcane juice, ghrita, yogurt, and milk).

This section also describes spheres above the Earth, including the planets, the Sun and the Moon. Four chapters (2.13 to 2.16) narrate the story of King Bharata, who abdicates his throne to live as a sannyasi (renunciant). A similar account appears in sections 5.7 to 5.14 of the Bhagavata Purana. According to scholar Stella Kramrisch, the name "Mandara" may be related to the word mandiram (Hindu Temple) and to the reasoning behind temple design, image, aim, and destination.

=== Third Amsa: Time ===
The opening chapters of the third book present the text's theory of manvantaras (each lasting 306.72 million years according to the Purana). This theory is based on the Hindu belief that existence is cyclical, and that yugas (eras) start, complete and then end. According to the text, six manvantaras passed, and the current age belong to the seventh named as 'Vaivasvata manvantara'. In each age, the text states, the Vedas are arranged into four parts and then changed, a process that occurred twenty eight times already. Each time, a Vyasa figure appears and organizes the eternal knowledge, with the aid of students.

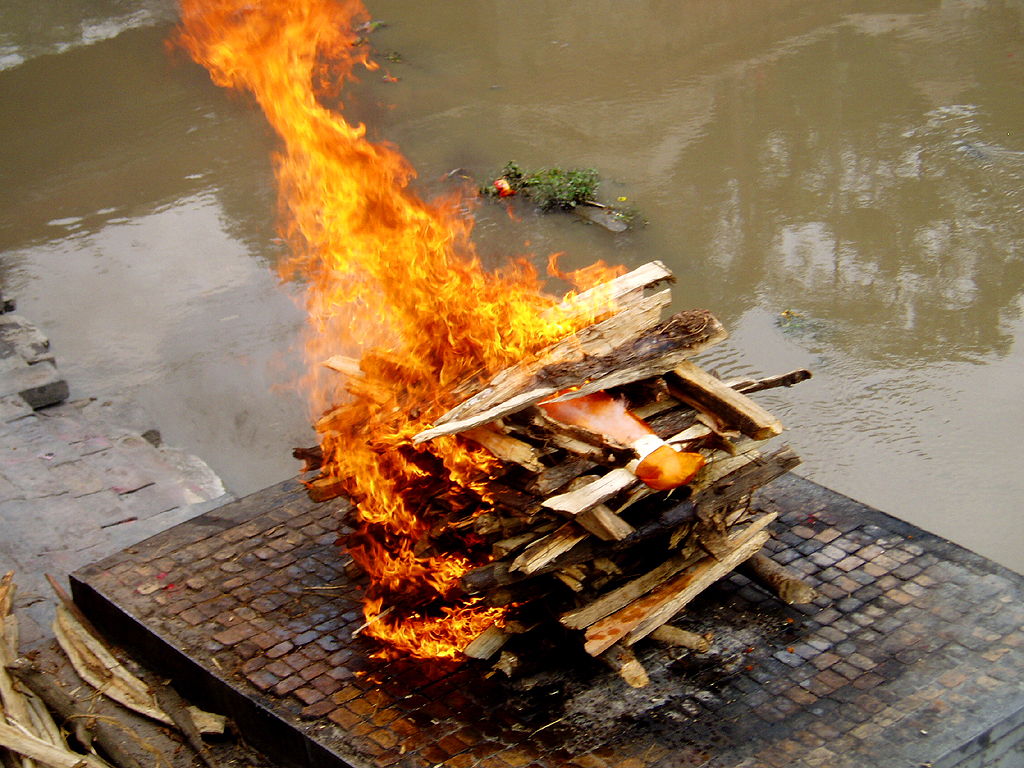
The Vishnu Purana includes several chapters in book 3 on rites of passage from birth through death. Included are chapters on cremation rites (above).

After discussing the succession of Vedic shakhas, the third book outlines the duties of four varnass (social classes, chapter 3.8), the four ashramas (stages of life, chapter 3.9), domestic rites of passage including marriage (chapters 3.10–3.12), and ancestral rites (shraddha) (chapters 3.13–3.16).

According to the discussion on varnas in the Vishnu Purana, the Brahmana should study the Shastras, worship arms and perform libations on behalf of others, the Kshatriya should maintain arms and protect the earth, the Vaishya should engage in commerce and farming; and the Shudra should subsist through trade profits, service to other varnas, and mechanical labor. The text further asserts that the ethical duties of all varnas include doing good to others and refraining from abuse, calumny, untruth, coveting another's wife, stealing another's property, bearing ill will, and wrongfully beating or killing anyone. The Purana states that one should be diligent in serving deities, sages, and gurus, and should seek the welfare of all creatures, one's own children, and one's own soul. According to the Vishnu Purana, any person, regardless of varna or ashrama, who lives according to these duties is considered the best worshipper of Vishnu and Lakshmi. Similar statements on ethical conduct appear elsewhere in the text.

The text describes the four stages of life as brahmacharya (student), grihastha (householder), vanaprastha (retirement) and sannyasa (renunciation, mendicant). According to Wilson's translation, the text reiterates the ethical duties in this chapter. The chapters on shraddha (rites for ancestors) describe the rituals associated with a death in the family, including the preparation of the dead body, cremation, and post-cremation rites.

The third book concludes with the Legend of Vishnu, through his Mayamoha, helping the devas (gods) overcome asuras (demons) by teaching the asuras heretical doctrines that deny the Vedas, which makes them easy to identify and they are subsequently killed.

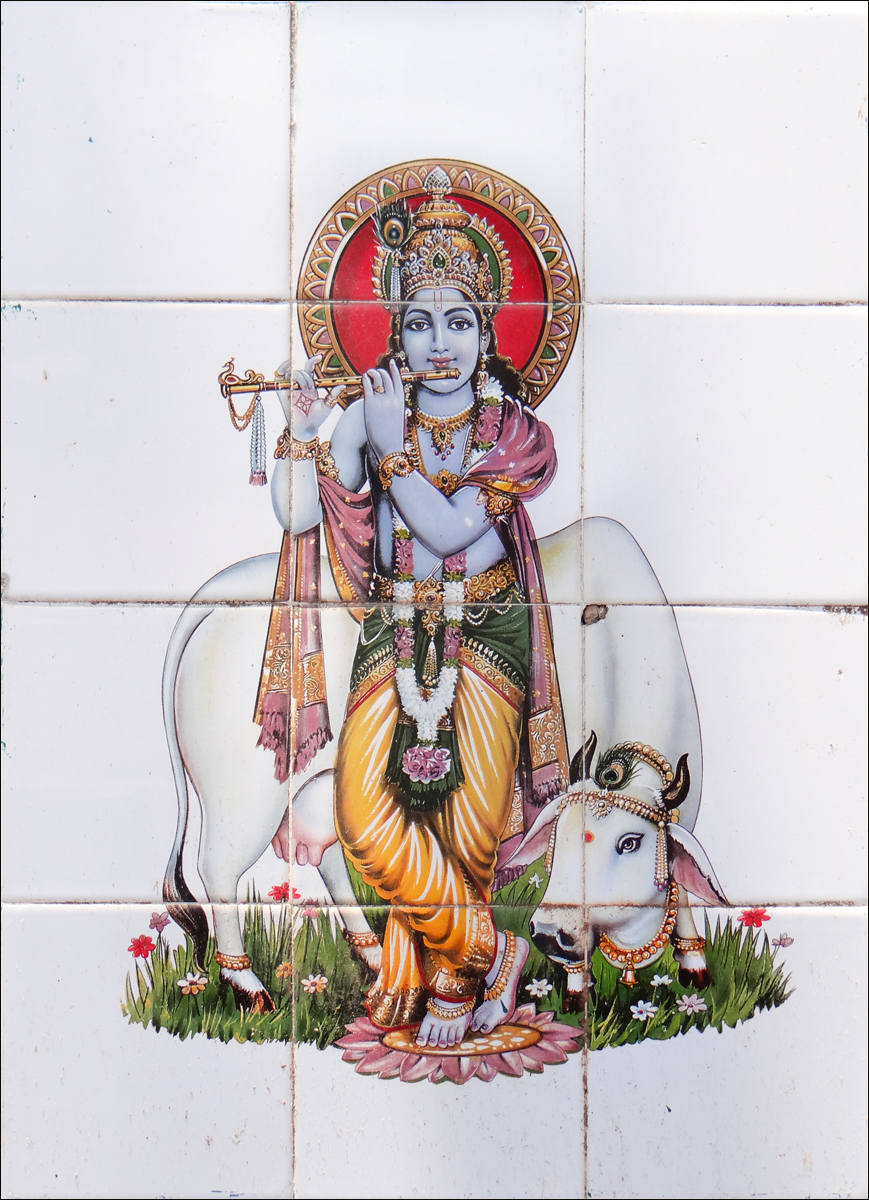
The longest part of the Vishnu Purana is dedicated to the story of Krishna (above).

=== Fourth Amsa: Dynasties ===
The fourth book of the text, consisting of 24 chapters, presents royal dynasties, beginning with Brahma and Sarasvati, followed by solar, lunar, fire and snake dynasties, and then those on earth across the yugas (eras). In this section,Parikshita is described as a current king. The text includes the legends of numerous figures, including Shaubhri, Mandhatri, Narmada, Kapila, Rama, Nimi, Janaka, Satyavati, Puru, Yadu, Krishna, Devaka, Pandu, Kuru, Bharata, Bhishma, and others.

=== Fifth Amsa: Krishna ===
The fifth book, the longest section of the Vishnu Purana, contains 38 chapters. It is dedicated to the legend of Krishna, described in the text as an incarnation of Vishnu. The book begins with the story of Krishna's birth, his childhood pranks and plays, his exploits, and his killing the demon-tyrant Kamsa, king of Mathura.

The Krishna narrative in the Vishnu Purana is similar to the accounts found in the Bhagavata Purana, several other Puranas, and the Harivamsa (an appendix to the Mahabharata). Scholars have long debated the textual relationship among these works: whether the Bhagavata Purana expanded upon the Krishna legend in the Vishnu Purana, whether the Vishnu Purana abridged a version found in the Bhagavata Purana, or whether both texts drew from the Harivamsa, which is estimated to have been composed sometime in the 1st millennium CE.

=== Sixth Amsa: Liberation ===
Soul and Prakriti

This soul is of its own nature,
pure, composed of happiness and wisdom.
The properties of pain, ignorance and impurity,
are those of Prakriti, not of soul.

— Vishnu Purana, 6.7

The last book of the Vishnu Purana is the shortest, with 8 chapters. The first part of the sixth book asserts that Kali Yuga is vicious, cruel and filled with evilness that create suffering, yet "Kali Yuga is excellent" because one can refuse to join the evil, devote oneself to Vishnu and thus achieve salvation.

The last chapters (6.6 to 6.7) of the text discuss Yoga and meditation as a means to Vishnu devotion. Contemplative devotion, asserts the text, is the union with the Brahman (supreme soul, ultimate reality), which is only achievable with virtues such as compassion, truth, honesty, disinterestedness, self-restraint and holy studies. The text mentions five yamas, five niyamas, pranayama and pratyahara. The pure and perfect soul is called Vishnu, states the text, and absorption in Vishnu is liberation.

The final chapter (6.8) of the text asserts itself to be an "imperishable Vaishnava Purana".

== Film Adaptation ==
The film Mahavatar Narsimha incorporates the Vishnu Purana amongst other Hindu scriptures and uses them as inspiration.

== Critical edition ==
A critical edition of the Sanskrit text of the Visnu-purana was published in two large volumes, 1997 and 1999. A critical edition is prepared by comparing a number of different manuscripts, recording their variant readings in notes, and choosing the best readings to constitute the text of the critical edition. A large-scale critical edition, in which 43 Sanskrit manuscripts were gathered and collated and 27 were chosen from which to prepare the Sanskrit edition, is: The Critical Edition of the Visnupuranam, edited by M. M. Pathak, 2 vols., Vadodara: Oriental Institute, 1997, 1999.

A translation of the critical edition was published in 2021 under the title The Vishnu Purana: Ancient Annals of the God with Lotus Eyes and is available under a Creative Commons license.

== Influences ==
The Vishnu Purana is one of the 18 major Puranas, and these texts share many legends, which likely influenced each other. The fifth chapter of the Vishnu Purana was likely influenced by the Mahabharata. Similarly, the verses on rites of passage and ashramas (stages of life) are likely drawn from the Dharmasutra literature. Rajendra Hazra, in 1940, assumed that the Vishnu Purana is ancient and proposed that texts such as Apasthamba Dharmasutra borrowed text from it. Modern scholars such as Allan Dahlaquist disagree, however, and state that the borrowing may have been in the other direction, from Dharmasutras into the Purana.

Other chapters, particularly those in book 5 and 6 of the Vishnu Purana, have Advaita Vedanta and Yoga influences. The theistic Vedanta scholar Ramanuja, according to Sucharita Adluri, incorporated ideas from the Vishnu Purana to identify the Brahman concept in the Upanishads with Vishnu, thus providing a Vedic foundation to the Sri Vaishnava tradition.

In Vedantic interpretation, the Vishnu Purana holds preeminent authority alongside the Prasthānatrayī. It is frequently cited as Purāṇa-ratna (the gem among Puranas) within the Sri Vaishnava tradition. Acharyas such as Yamunacharya and Ramanuja drew extensively upon its verses. Particularly the dialogue between Parashara and Maitreya in the first and sixth amshas established that the physical world and individual souls (jivas) constitute the real body (sharira) of Vishnu. They used this to formulate the ontology of Vishishtadvaita. Earlier commentators including Adi Shankara, also quoted the text in commentaries on the Brahma Sutra and the Vishnu Sahasranama, relying on its explanations of cosmology and non-duality.

== See also ==
- Dvaita Vedanta
- Hindu texts
- Upanishads
- Vedas

== Notes ==
- Bryant, Edwin Francis (2007). Krishna: A Sourcebook. Oxford University Press. ISBN 978-0-19-803400-1.
- Collins, Charles Dillard (1988). The Iconography and Ritual of Siva at Elephanta: On Life, Illumination, and Being. SUNY Press. ISBN 978-0-88706-773-0.
- Dimmitt, Cornelia; van Buitenen, J. A. B. (2012). Classical Hindu Mythology: A Reader in the Sanskrit Puranas. Temple University Press (1st Edition: 1977). ISBN 978-1-4399-0464-0.
- Dalal, Rosen (2014). Hinduism: An Alphabetical Guide. Penguin. ISBN 978-8184752779.
- Dutt, MN (1896). A prose translation of Vishnupuranam. Elysium Press.
- Flood, Gavin (1996). An Introduction to Hinduism. Cambridge: Cambridge University Press. ISBN 0-521-43878-0.
- K P Gietz; et al. (1992). Epic and Puranic Bibliography (Up to 1985) Annoted and with Indexes: Part I: A - R, Part II: S - Z, Indexes. Otto Harrassowitz Verlag. ISBN 978-3-447-03028-1.
- Ariel Glucklich (2008). The Strides of Vishnu : Hindu Culture in Historical Perspective: Hindu Culture in Historical Perspective. Oxford University Press. ISBN 978-0-19-971825-2.
- Johnson, W.J. (2009). A Dictionary of Hinduism. Oxford University Press. ISBN 978-0-19-861025-0.
- Kramrisch, Stella (1976). The Hindu Temple, Volume 1 & 2. Motilal Banarsidass. ISBN 81-208-0223-3.
- Rao, Velcheru Narayana (1993). "Purana as Brahminic Ideology". In Doniger Wendy (ed.). Purana Perennis: Reciprocity and Transformation in Hindu and Jaina Texts. Albany: State University of New York Press. ISBN 0-7914-1381-0.
- Rocher, Ludo (1986). The Puranas. Otto Harrassowitz Verlag. ISBN 978-3447025225.
- Thapar, Romila (2013), The Past Before Us, Harvard University Press, ISBN 978-0-674-72651-2
- Wilson, H. H. (1864). The Vishnu Purana: A System of Hindu Mythology and Tradition (Volume 1: Introduction, Book I). Read Country Books (reprinted in 2006). ISBN 1-84664-664-2.
- Wilson, H. H. (1865). The Vishnu Purana: A System of Hindu Mythology and Tradition (Volume 2: Book I & II).
- Wilson, H. H. (1866). The Vishnu Purana: A System of Hindu Mythology and Tradition (Volume 3: Book III & IV).
- Wilson, H. H. (1868). The Vishnu Purana: A System of Hindu Mythology and Tradition (Volume 4: Book IV & V).
- Wilson, H. H. (1870). The Vishnu Purana: A System of Hindu Mythology and Tradition (Volume 5 Part 1: Book V & VI).
