= Brihada Vishnu Purana =

Purana text in Hinduism

- बृहद विष्णु पुराण

Information
- Religion: Sanatana Hinduism
- Language: Sanskrit
- Period: Around or before 1000 AD
- Upapurana
- A text of Purana in Hinduism

Brihada Vishnu Purana (Sanskrit: बृहद विष्णु पुराण) also known as Brihat Vishnu Purana (Romanised: Bṛhat Viṣṇu Purāṇa) or Vrihadda Vishnu Purana is a Sanskrit religious text in the tradition of Hinduism dedicated to Vishnu.

== Etymology ==
The word "Brihada" or romanised form "Bṛhat" is an adjective which means large or great. Thus the literal meaning of the text "Brihada Vishnu Purana" or "Bṛhat Viṣṇu Purāṇa" is "Larger Vishnu Purana".

== Description ==
In the text Brihada Vishnu Purana, the Vedic sage Parashara is the Guru as well as speaker of the text and the sage Maitreya is the disciple as well as the listener of the text. It is said that the original text of the Brihada Vishnu Purana has been lost. The information about the Brihada Vishnu Purana is found from the references of the other Hindu texts available. According to the author Dharmanath Sharma of the text Brihadvishnupuranie Mithila Mahatmya, the information of the entire Brihad Vishnu Purana is nowhere available. It is said that only the Mithila Mahatmya part of the text Brihada Vishnu Purana is available and preserved. It was later translated in Maithili, Hindi and Nepali languages.

Vijayakanta Mishra in his text "Cultural Heritage of Mithila" mentioned the text Brihada Vishnu Purana which provides the twelve names of the ancient Mithila.

In the texts Ekamra-Purana and Laghubhāgavatāmṛta, the Brihada Vishnu Purana is mentioned as Brihad-Vaishnava in the list of Upaparanas. According to scholars, Brihada Vishnu Purana is the literature of Vaishnava. The Indian scholar Hemādri in his encyclopaedic text Caturvargacintāmaṇi mentioned that the text Brihada Vishnu Purana might had been written not later than 1000 AD.
