= Maitreya (Mahābhārata) =

Sage in the Mahabharata

Maitreya (Sanskrit: मैत्रेय) (sometimes written Mythreya) was a sage or Maharishi in the Mahabharata. His descendants are Maitreya or Moitra or Maitra or Maitreya Maharishi gotra Brahmins. He came to the court of Hastinapura to advise Duryodhana to restore the kingdom of the Pandavas, a little while after the sons of Pandu had gone into exile, having been defeated at dice. However, Duryodhana did not even bother to listen to the sage, and showed his disrespect all too plainly. Incensed, the sage cursed him and said, "Fourteen years hence, you shall be destroyed in battle by the Pandavas, along with your kinsmen and all that you hold dear. Bheema shall dispatch you to the abode of Yama, by breaking your thighs with the mace." Some hold that the curse of this sage played a major part in encompassing the destruction of the Kauravas.

In the Bhagavata Purana he is referred to as Kauṣārava. Vidura who left the kingdom during the Kurukshetra War being insulted by Duryodhana, met Maitreya. Vidura learned from him various spiritual and philosophical subjects, which Maitreya had received from Krishna. Vidura, after the death of all the Yadavas resorted to going to Badari. He was followed by his friend Uddhava and met Maitreya on the way. Krishna before leaving the mortal world transferred the spiritual knowledge to both of them and instructed Maitreya to teach that to Vidura on meeting.
