= Videha =

Ancient Indian tribe

Kingdom of the Videha
- c. 1100 BCE–c. 7th century BCE
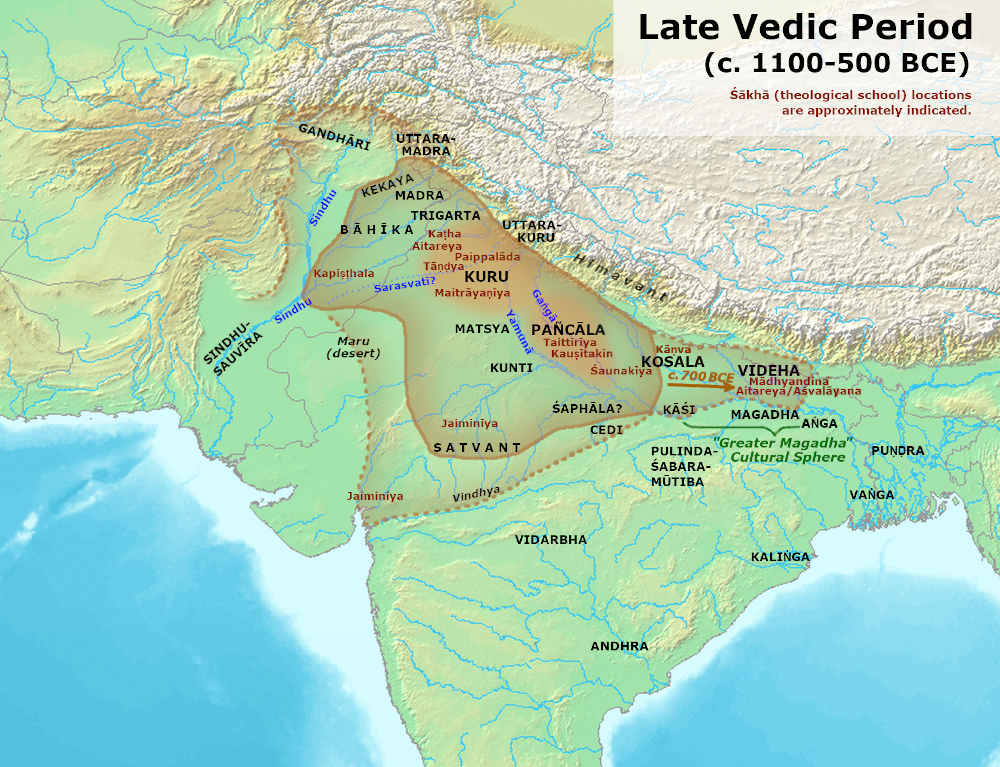
- The Kingdom of the Videhas and other kingdoms of the late Vedic period

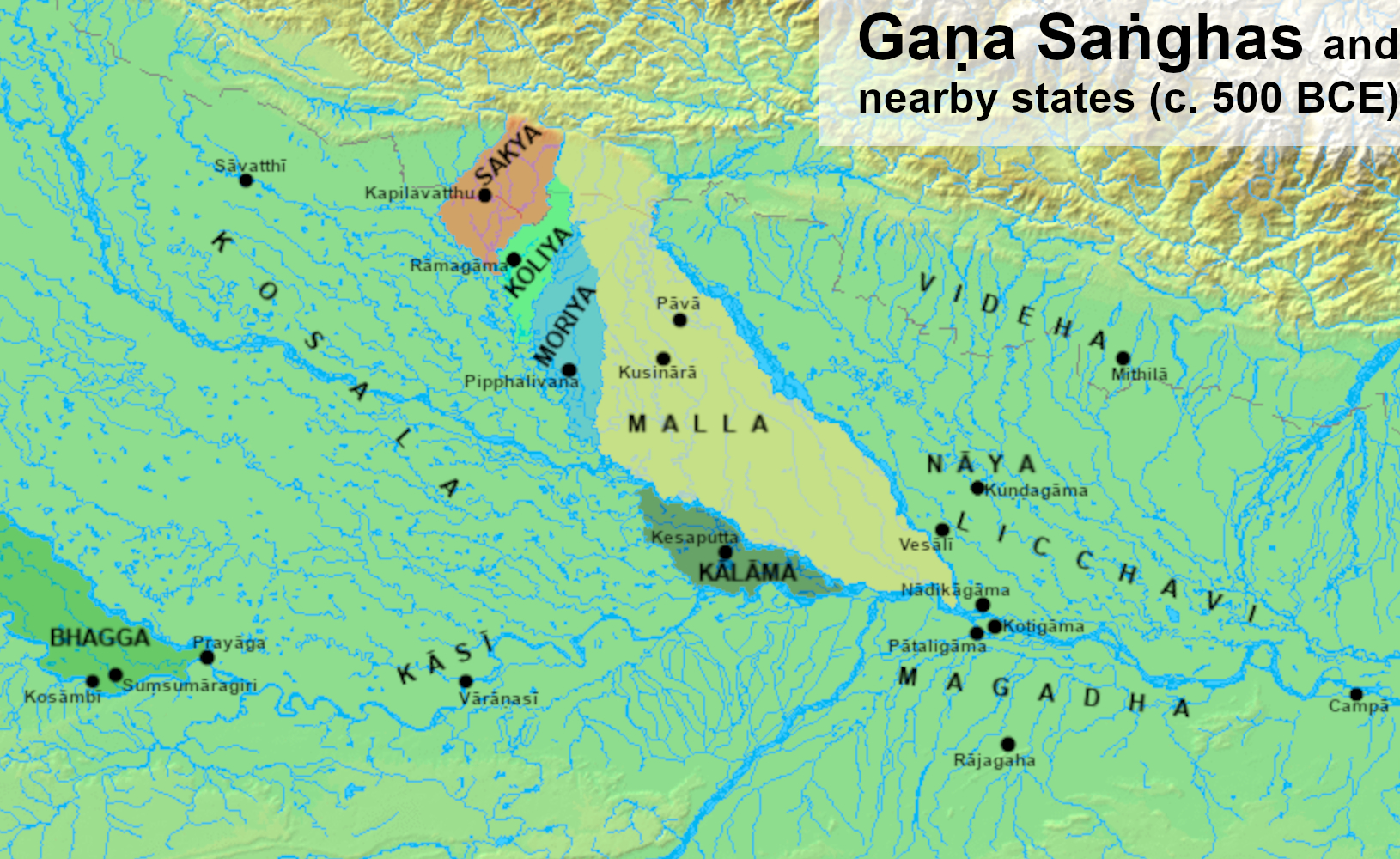
- Republican Videha (ruled by Vajjika League) among the Gaṇasaṅghas in the Post-Vedic period
- Status: Kingdom (earlier); Republic of the Vajjika League (later)
- Capital: Mithila
- Common languages: Sanskrit
- Religion: Historical Vedic religion Proto-Jainism
- Demonym: Vaideha
- Government: Monarchy (earlier) Aristocratic republic (later)
- Rājā (earlier) Gaṇa Mukhya (later)
- Legislature: Sabhā
- Establishment: By Videgha Mathava
- Historical era: Iron Age
  - Established: c. 1100 BCE
  - Republic Vajjika League dethroned monarchy Viedha dynasty: c. 7th century BCE
| Preceded by | Succeeded by |
| Vedic Period | Vajjika League |
- Today part of: India; Nepal

Videha (Prākrit: 𑀯𑀺𑀤𑁂𑀳 Videha; Pāli: Videha; Sanskrit: Videha) was an ancient Indo-Aryan tribe of north-eastern South Asia whose existence is attested during the Iron Age. The population of Videha, the Vaidehas, were initially organised into a monarchy but later became a gaṇasaṅgha (an aristocratic oligarchic republic), presently referred to as the Videha Republic, which was part of the larger Vajjika League.

== Location ==
The borders of the Videha kingdom were the Sadānirā river in the west, the Kauśikī river in the east, the Gaṅgā river in the south, and the Himālaya mountains in the north. To the west of the Sadānirā river, the neighbour of the Vaidehas was the kingdom of Kosala.

The Sadānirā and Kauśikī rivers remained the respective western and eastern boundaries of the later Videha republic, although its territory covered only the northern part of that of the former Videha kingdom, with the latter hence being called Mahā-Videha ("greater Videha"). The Videha republic was located along the foothills of the Himalaya mountains, in what are now the Tarāī region and the south-eastern parts of Nepal including the lower hill ranges, as well as the northern part of what in present time is the Indian state of Bihār. The Malla republics were the neighbours of Videha to the west of the Sadānirā during the republican period.

== Name ==
The name Videha is the Prākrit version of the name whose Sanskrit form was Videgha. The capital of the Vaidehas was the city of Mithilā, whose name was derived from that of the Vaideha king Mithi. According to Vayu Purana, the capital city of Videha is referred as Jayantapura which was founded by the King Nimi. Similarly in Bal Kand of Valmiki Ramayana, the city is referred as Vaijanta.

== Monarchic period ==
The Vaidehas were an Indo-Aryan tribe in the eastern Gangetic plain of the ancient Indian subcontinent. The Mahā-Videha ("greater Videha") kingdom, located between the Sadānirā river in the west, the Kauśikī river in the east, the Gaṅgā river in the south, and the Himālaya mountains in the north, was founded around 800 BCE, according to the Mahāgovinda Sutta by the king Reṇu with the help of his steward, Mahāgovinda Jotipāla, and claimed by the 5th century CE Buddhist commentator Buddhaghosa to have been colonised by the king Mandhātā with settlers from a place he retroactively referred to as pubba Videha ("old Videha"). The Prākrit name Videha, meaning "without walls or ramparts," was an epithet used in the sense of "destroyers of walls and ramparts".

Map of Videha Kingdom

Despite being an Indo-Aryan people, the Vaidehas were not fully Brahmanised, lived in the Indo-Aryan but non-Vedic cultural region of Greater Magadha located to the east of the Gaṅgā-Yamunā confluence along with the similarly Greater Magadhan non-Vedic Indo-Aryan Kāśya and Kauśalya tribes, with whom they had close cultural relations from early times, and along with whom the Vaidehas would be continually mentioned in ancient South Asian literature. Brahmanical literature therefore grouped them along with the Kāśyas, Kauśalyas, Māgadhīs, and Āṅgeyas, as Prācyas (meaning "Easterners") not belonging to the Madhyama-Diś, that is the land of the Brahmaṛṣis where Vedic rituals and customs were followed, and consisting of the areas of the Kuru, Pāñcāla, Matsya, and Śūrasena tribes. Brahmanical literature also referred to the Vaidehas and the Māgadhīs with less prestige than the Brahmanised Kuru-Pāñcālas and with language referring to mixed castes.

The Vaidehas were initially organised into a monarchical regime during the era of the Brāhmaṇas, lasting from around 900 BCE to around 700 BCE. One attested king of Mahā-Videha was Mithi, who gave his name to the tribe's capital of Mithilā.

The Vaidehas were Brahmanised during the later Brāhmaṇa period, shortly after Kosala's Brahmanisation. This Brahminisation of Mahā-Videha happened during the reign of the king Janaka, who was one of the leading patrons of the new doctrine of Brahman and whose purohita Yājñavalkya was a disciple of the Kuru-Pāñcāla Vedic sage Uddālaka Āruṇi. Janaka and Yājñavalkya together provided spiritual and intellectual leadership to the paṇḍitas of the Uttarapatha. And although Mahā-Videha had not previously been included among the four ancient holy lands of Bhāratavarṣa, it came to acquire sanctity because the Dharmaśāstras approved of it as a pure land, although the later the Manusmṛti mentions the Vaidehas with contempt, following the earlier Brahmanical tradition of opposition to the Prācya non-Vedic Indo-Aryan tribes.

The close relations between the Vaidehas, the Kāśyas, and the Kauśalyas continued after the Brahminisation of these states: at one point Jala Jātūkarṇya was the purohita of all three kingdoms; and the king Para Āṭnāra, who was a descendant of the Kauśalya king Hiraṇyanābha, ruled over both Mahā-Videha and Kosala.

This monarchical period of the Vaidehas lasted between 150 and 200 years, and the maximum estimated number of Vaideha kings during this phase amounts to eight.

== Republican period ==
Shortly before or during the lifetime of the Buddha, around the 7th or 6th century BCE, the Licchavi tribe invaded the territory of the Mahā-Videha kingdom and temporarily occupied the Vaideha capital of Mithilā, from where they could best administer the territory of Mahā-Videha. The consequence of the occupation of Videha by the republican Licchavikas was that the Licchavikas relatively peacefully overthrew the already weakened Vaideha monarchical system and Janaka's dynasty, and replaced them by a gaṇasaṅgha republican system.

Facing the rising power of Magadha to the south of the Gaṅgā, the Licchavikas established their republic in the southern part of the former Mahā-Videha kingdom's territory and moved their political centre to Vesālī, while the new Videha republic centred around Mithilā existed in a limited territory covering only the northern part of Mahā-Videha. Many members of the Vaideha aristocracy who had submitted to the Licchavikas joined them in moving to Vesālī, and therefore became members of the Licchavi ruling aristocratic Assembly. Vaideha politicians also moved to Vesālī and obtained high posts there, such as the Vaideha minister Sakala who had to flee from his colleagues' jealousy and moved to Vesālī where he became a prominent citizen and was elected Nāyaka; Sakala had two sons, Gopāla and Siṃha, who both married Vesālia women, and Siṃha's daughter Vāsavī married the Māgadhī king Bimbisāra.

The Licchavikas themselves henceforth became the leading power within the territory of the former Mahā-Videha kingdom, with the Licchavika Assembly holding the sovereign and supreme rights over this territory while the Videha republic was ruled by an Assembly of the kṣatriyas residing in and around Mithilā, and which governed in the name of the Licchavika Assembly. The Videha republic was thus under significant influence of Licchavi, and it joined the latter as one of the two most important members of the Vajjika League, which was a temporary league led by Licchavi, with the Vaideha rājās holding an undetermined number out of the nine non-Licchavika seats of the eighteen-member Vajjika Council. Despite being a prominent member of the Vajjika League, Videha was a minor power within it compared to the Licchavikas and the Mallakas, and Videha maintained limited autonomy within the league concerning its domestic administration under the supervision of Licchavi, who fully controlled Vaideha foreign policy. The Videha republic's relations with other members of the Vajjika League, such as the Malla republics, were good, although occasional quarrels arose between the various member states of the league.

During the life of the Buddha, Videha abandoned Brahmanism and embraced Buddhism.

After the death of the Buddha, the Licchavikas, the Mallakas, and the Sakyas claimed shares of his relics while the Vaidehas and the Nāyikas did not appear among the list of states claiming a share because they were dependencies of the Licchavikas without their own sovereignty, and therefore could not put forth their own claim while Licchavi could.

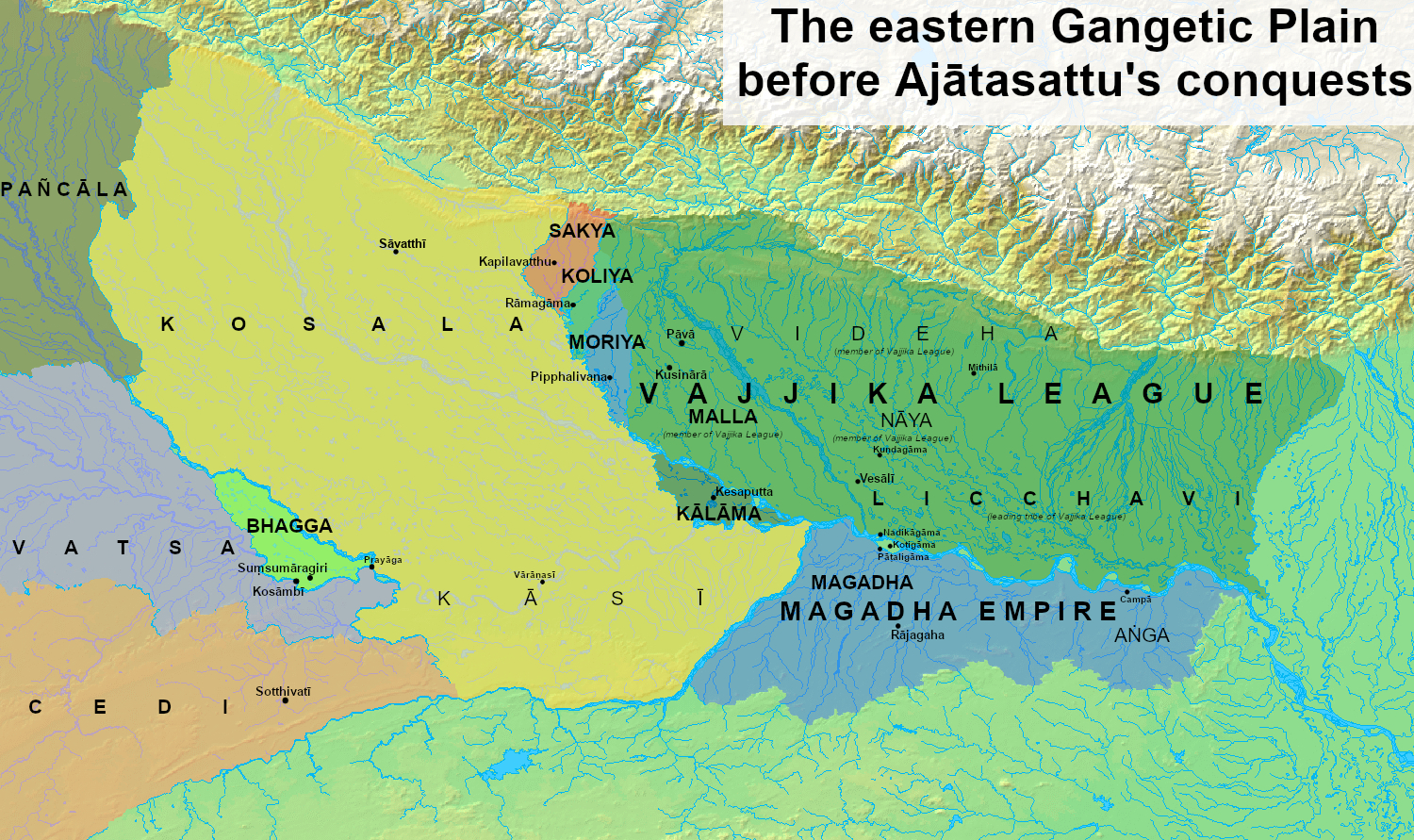
Map of the eastern Gangetic plain before Ajātasattu's conquests
(Malla shown within the Vajjika League)

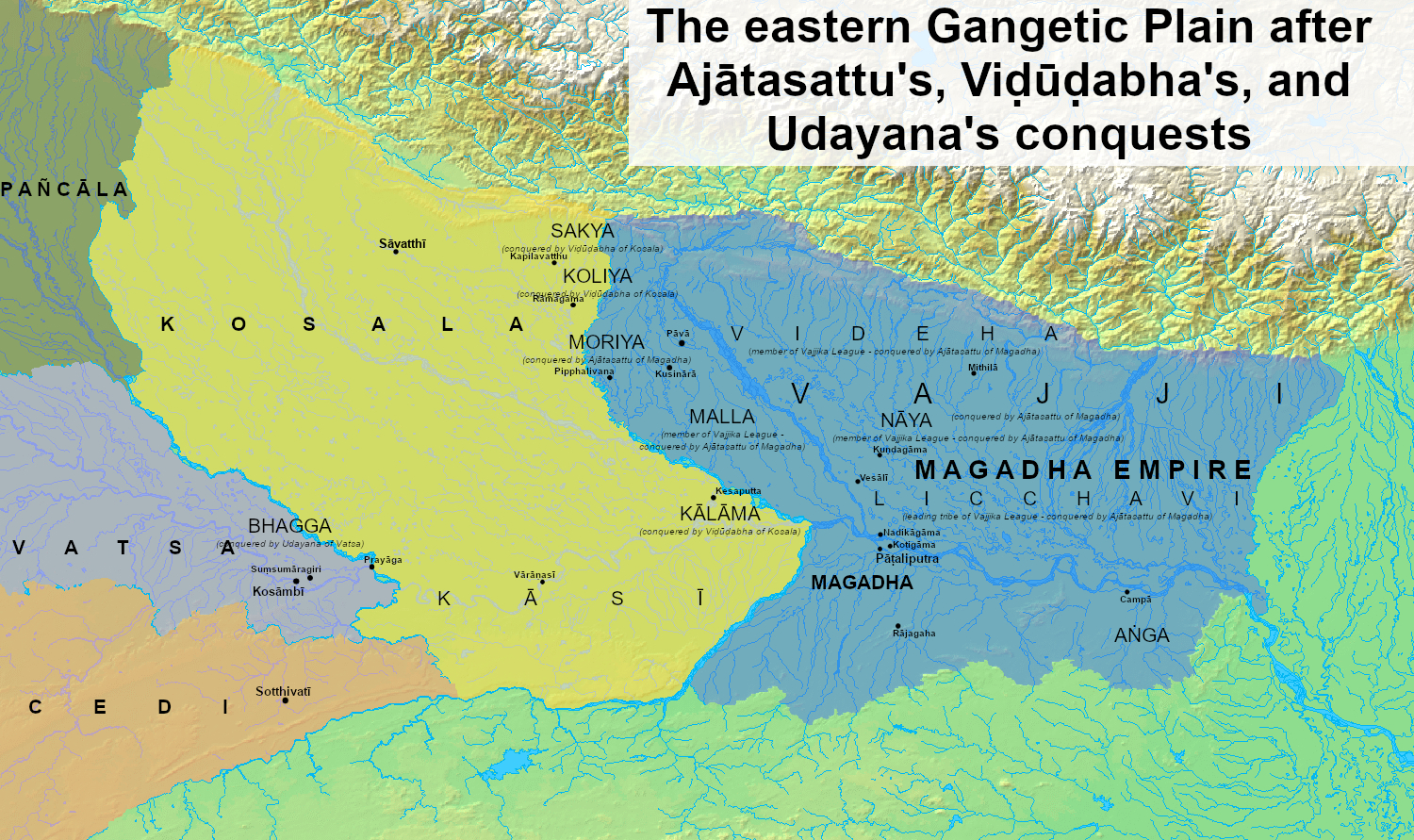
Map of the eastern Gangetic plain after Ajātasattu's conquest of the Vajjika League and of Moriya

== Conquest by Magadha ==
The relations of the Licchavikas, who led the Vajjika League which the Vaidehas were part of, with their southern neighbour, the kingdom of Magadha, were initially good, and the wife of the Māgadhī king Bimbisāra was the Vesālia princess Vāsavī, who was the daughter of the Licchavika Nāyaka Sakala's son Siṃha. There were nevertheless occasional tensions between Licchavi and Magadha, such as the competition at the Mallaka capital of Kusinārā over acquiring the relics of the Buddha after his death.

In another case, the Licchavikas once invaded Māgadhī territory from across the Gaṅgā, and at some point the relations between Magadha and Licchavi permanently deteriorated as result of a grave offence committed by the Licchavikas towards the Māgadhī king Bimbisāra.

The hostilities between Licchavi and Magadha continued under the rule of Ajātasattu, who was Bimbisāra's son with another Licchavika princess, Vāsavī, after he had killed Bimbisāra and usurped the throne of Magadha. Eventually Licchavi supported a revolt against Ajātasattu by his younger step-brother and the governor of Aṅga, Vehalla, who was the son of Bimbisāra by another Licchavika wife of his, Cellanā, a daughter of Ceḍaga, who was the head of both the Licchavi republic and the Vajjika League; Bimbisāra had chosen Vehalla as his successor following Ajātasattu's falling out of his favour after the latter had been caught conspiring against him, and the Licchavikas had attempted to place Vehalla on the throne of Magadha after Ajātasattu's usurpation and had allowed Vehalla to use their capital Vesālī as base for his revolt. After the failure of this rebellion, Vehalla sought refuge at his grandfather's place in the Licchavika and Vajjika capital of Vesālī, following which Ajātasattu repeatedly attempted to negotiate with the Licchavikas-Vajjikas. After Ajātasattu's repeated negotiation attempts ended in failure, he declared war on the Vajjika League in 484 BCE.

Tensions between Licchavi and Magadha were exacerbated by the handling of the joint Māgadhī-Licchavika border post of Koṭigāma on the Gaṅgā by the Licchavika-led Vajjika League who would regularly collect all valuables from Koṭigāma and leave none to the Māgadhīs. Therefore Ajātasattu decided to destroy the Vajjika League in retaliation, but also because, as an ambitious empire-builder whose mother Vāsavī was Licchavika princess of Vaidehī descent, he was interested in the territory of the former Mahā-Videha kingdom which by then was part of the Vajjika League. Ajātasattu's hostility towards the Vajjika League was also the result of the differing forms of political organisation between Magadha and the Vajjika League, with the former being monarchical and the latter being republican, not unlike the opposition of the ancient Greek kingdom of Sparta to the democratic form of government in Athens, and the hostilities between the ancient Macedonian king Philip II to the Athenian and Theban republics.

As a prominent member of the Vajjika League, the Videha republic was also threatened by Ajātasattu, and it therefore fought on the side of the other confederate tribes of the league against Magadha. The military forces of the Vajjika League were initially too strong for Ajātasattu to be successful against them, and it required him having recourse to diplomacy and intrigues over the span of a decade to finally defeat the Vajjika League by 468 BCE and annex its territories, including Videha, to the kingdom of Magadha. Mention of the Vaidehas end after the Māgadhī conquest, and Kauṭilya and Pāṇini did not mention them as an independent polity, but instead included them as part of Vṛji (the country of Mahā-Videha, which by then was known by the name of the Vajjika League).

== Monarchical social institutions ==
The kings of Videha were titled Videha or Vedeha, meaning "Lord of Videha."

== Republican institutions (social and political organization) ==
=== Assembly ===
Like the Licchavikas, the republican Vaideha gaṇasaṅgha (aristocratic oligarchic republic) had their own ruling Assembly. The Vaidehas, like their Licchavika, Mallaka, Nāyika confederates within the Vajjika League, were a kṣatriya tribe, and the Vaidehas' Assembly was largely constituted of the heads of the kṣatriya clans of the tribe, although it was smaller than the Licchavika Assembly and the heads of non-kṣatriya clans were allowed to join it: brāhmaṇas were either allowed to become members of the Assembly or, as brāhmaṇa heads of families, were able to influence it; since Mithilā was a centre of trade, wealthy merchants also either were members of the Assembly or were able to influence it. Of the 84,000 to 100,000 population of Videha, the 6,000 heads of the kṣatriya clans were automatically accorded membership within the Vaideha Assembly (called rājās, meaning "ruler"), similarly to how membership to the Licchavika Assembly functioned.

Like the Licchavika Assembly, the Vaideha Assembly possessed a santhāgāra as meeting place, although it normally met only once a year.

=== Gaṇa Mukhya (Consul) ===
The Gaṇa Mukhya ("Head of the Republic") was a consul rājā chosen by the citizen body, and who maintained the old title of Videha or Vedeha ("Lord of Videha"). The position of Gaṇa Mukhya was accessible only to a kṣatriya who had the support of his clan and of influential people, and criteria for his election included personal leadership, strength, eloquence, and popularity.

Like the Licchavika Gaṇa Mukhya, the Gaṇa Mukhya of Videha shared his power with a body of four public officers, consisting of the Gaṇa Mukhya himself, as well as a uparājā ("Viceroy"), a senāpati ("General-in-Chief"), and a bhaṇḍāgārika ("Treasurer").

=== Council ===
Since the Vaideha Assembly met only once a year, it was the Council, that is the inner body of the Assembly, which met more frequently to administer the Videha republic. The Vaideha Council was the body with the supreme authority of the internal administration of the republic, although in practice it held the supreme power of the republic under the administration of the Licchavikas.

This Council was similar to that of the Licchavikas, being composed of members elected from within the Assembly, but was smaller and might have been composed of four rājās, consisting of the Gaṇa Mukhya and three councillor rājās, who were in charge of the public administration of the republic and recommended measures of importance to the Assembly. The Council also received envoys of other states and took important decisions in the name of the Assembly, which had to approve them.

== Courtesanry ==
An unusual custom of the Vaidehas was that every one of their villages and towns had a dancing girl of courtesan, and Videha had a troop composed of panegyrists, music instrument players, and those dancing girls who were considered to be the most beautiful.

At the state level, a beauty competition was held to choose who was the most beautiful woman of the whole state. This woman, who possessed talents and traits such as significant beauty, charm, and was accomplished in dance and music, was not allowed to lead a normal married life, and she was instead chosen to be the Nagaravadhu ("courtesan of the republic"), and spent her life as a public woman with political influence. One such courtesan of Videha was Piṅgalā, who was mentioned in the Bhaviṣyata Purāṇa, which is a later text.

== Legacy ==
Beginning with the Gupta period, the names Mithilā and Tirabhukti replaced that of Videha as the appellation of the whole former territory of the Mahā-Videha kingdom.

Videha and Mithilā appear in the Itihasa texts such as the Rāmāyaṇa and the Mahābhārata, with the protagonist of the former being the Vaidehī princess Sītā. The narrative of these epics is based on the monarchical period of Videha.

== Rulers ==
Videha Kingdom with its capital city Mithila

There were 52 Janaka (kings) ruled Videha dynasty of Mithila-

1. Mithi - (founder of Mithila and the first Janaka)
2. Udavasu
3. Nandivardhana
4. Suketu
5. Devarata
6. Brihadvrata
7. Mahavira
8. Sudhriti
9. Dristaketu
10. Haryasva
11. Maru
12. Pratindhaka
13. Kritiratha
14. Devamidha
15. Vibhuta
16. Mahidhrata
17. Kirtirata
18. Mahorama
19. Svarnorama
20. Hrasvaroma
21. Seeradhvaja (father of Sita)
22. Bhaanumaan
23. Shatadyumna
24. Shuchi
25. Oorjanaamaa
26. Kriti
27. Anjana
28. Kurujit
29. Arishtanemi
30. Shrutaayu
31. Supaarshva
32. Srinjaya
33. Kshemaavee
34. Anenaa
35. Bhaumaratha
36. Satyaratha
37. Upagu
38. Upagupta
39. Svaagata
40. Svaananda
41. Suvarchaa
42. Supaarshwa
43. Subhaasha
44. Sushruta
45. Jaya
46. Vijaya
47. Rita
48. Sunaya
49. Veetahavya
50. Dhriti
51. Bahulaashwa
52. Kriti - (last King of Videha or Janaka dynasty, Kirti Janak was atrocious ruler who lost control over his subjects. He was dethroned by public under leadership of Acharyas (learned men).

During this period of fall of Videha dynasty, the famous republic of Licchavi was rising in Vaishali and Mithila region came under control of Licchavi clan of Vajji confederacy in around eight century BCE.

== See also ==
- Vedic period
- Janapada and Mahajanapada
- Gaṇasaṅgha
