= Kakabhushundi Ramayan – Anasuni Kathayein =

Indian mythology television series

- Based on: Tulsidas Ramcharithamanasa; Kakabhushundi Ramayan; Valmiki Ramayan
- Screenplay by: Shailesh Singh/ Shrikant Vishwakarma; Dialogues; Gopal Verma; Shailesh Singh/ Shrikant Vishwakarma
- Story by: Prem Sagar
- Directed by: Vicky Chauhan
- Creative director: Shiv Sagar
- Starring: Devesh Sharma; Vaibhavi Kapoor; Pawan Sharma
- Opening theme: Kakbhushundi Ramayan Theme
- Composers: Surya Raj Kamal; Lenin Nandi (BG)
- Country of origin: India
- Original language: Hindi
- No. of seasons: 3
- No. of episodes: 312

Production
- Producers: Prem Sagar; Neelam Sagar Shiv Sagar
- Editor: Shums Mirza
- Camera setup: Multi-camera
- Running time: 22-24 minutes
- Production company: Sagar World

Original release
- Network: DD National
- Release: 18 November 2024 – 7 May 2026

Kakbhushundi Ramayan – Anasuni Kathayein is a Hindi TV series that aired from 18 November 2024 to 7 May 2026 on DD National. It is produced and directed by Prem Sagar, Neelam Sagar and Shiv Sagar under the banner Sagar World. It is a television adaptation of the ancient Indian epic Ramayana. It is inspired by Ramayan (1987 TV series) and is primarily based on Valmiki Ramayana, Tulsidas Ramcharitmanas and Kakabhushundi Ramayan.

Kakabhushundi is believed to be one of the greatest devotees of Rama who has witnessed Ramayan 11 times. The show is mainly based on: Ananda Ramayana, Madhava Kundali Ramayana, KakaBhushundi Ramayana, Adhyatma Ramayana, Yoga Vashishta, Bramha Purana, Skanda Purana, Vishnu Purana. Other sources used were: Tamil - Kamba Ramayanam, Marathi - Bhavartha Ramayana, Bengali - Krutivas Ramayan, Telugu - Sri Ranganatha Ramayanam, Kannada - Ramachandra Charita Puranam, Malayalam - Adhyatma Ramayanam.

== Plot ==
The show is based on the conversation regarding Ramayan between Kakabhushundi and Garuda, both devotees of Rama.

== Cast ==
- Pawan Sharma as Vishnu / Rama
- Vaibhavi Kapoor as Lakshmi / Sita
- Devesh Sharma as Lakshman
- Danish Akhtar Saifi as Hanuman
- Sandeep Mohan as Dasharatha
- Aspak Khan as Vanar
- Jaydeep Dabgar as Rajkumar
- Jal gandhi as child Ram
- Swastik joshi as child laxman
- Jainil panchal as child Shatrughan
- Shourya rawat as child bharat
- Rudraksh nisiddh panchal as child ram Friend ( villager )
- Raunaque Sidana as Sukaushal
- Sugandha Srivastava as Kausalya
- Gurpreet Kaur Sandhu as Sumitra
- Sonia Singh as Kaikeyi
- Rachana Goyal as Manthara
- Rohit Devda / Aaryan Singh Rajput as Indra
- Satyyaa Patel / Gaurav Nain as Agni
- Vidhi Shah as Vedavati
- Amit Mishra as Bharata
- Pushya Mitra as Shatrughna
- Naviya Saini as Urmila
- Harshita Patharia as Mandavi
- Bhumika Gaur / Pinki Soni as Shrutakirti
- Devanand Pathak as Janaka
- Alka Nair as Sunayana
- Manya Nagdev as Chandrabhaga
- Vishal Nayak as Bhagwan Shiv
- Neha Pardeshi as Parvati
- Sagar Kale as Kakabhushundi
- Akshay Nalawade as Garuda
- Amit Pachori / Bhanu Pratap Singh Rana as Vali / Sugriva
- Ayat Khan as Tara
- Shalini Tiwari as Rumā
- Pankaj Kamad as Angada
- Swayam Prakash Parashar as Vasishtha
- Shravani Goswami as Arundhati
- Gopal Verma as Vishwamitra
- Raviz Thakur as Ravana
- Harleen Kaur Rekhi as Mandodari
- Durgavati Swami as Kaikasi
- Akki Nath Sisodiya as Meghanada
- Amrita Parihar as Sulochana
- Abhishek A Arti as Guha
- Shailendra Prajapati as Guha's minister
- Anmol Soni as Vibhishana
- Isha Narayan Singh as Sarama
- Shubham Jaibeer Saharawat as Vidyutajihva
- Archana Singh / Deepti Kumar as Shurpanakha
- Pratik Pandit as Jambumali
- Madhuri Pandey as Trijata
- Chakramani Mishra as Sachiv
- V S Prince Ratann as Anal: Vibhishana's guptachar
- Amit Sharma as Panas
- Rajeev Singh as Jambavan
- Aditya Ranjan as Nala
- Shahnavaj Khan as Nīla

== Production ==
It was produced and directed by Prem Sagar and Shiv Sagar.

It is the fourth television adaptation based on Ramayana from the family of Sagar after Ramayan (1987 TV series), Ramayan (2008 TV series) and Ramayan (2012 TV series)
