= Sarama (Ramayana) =

Queen consort of Lanka in the Hindu epic Ramayana

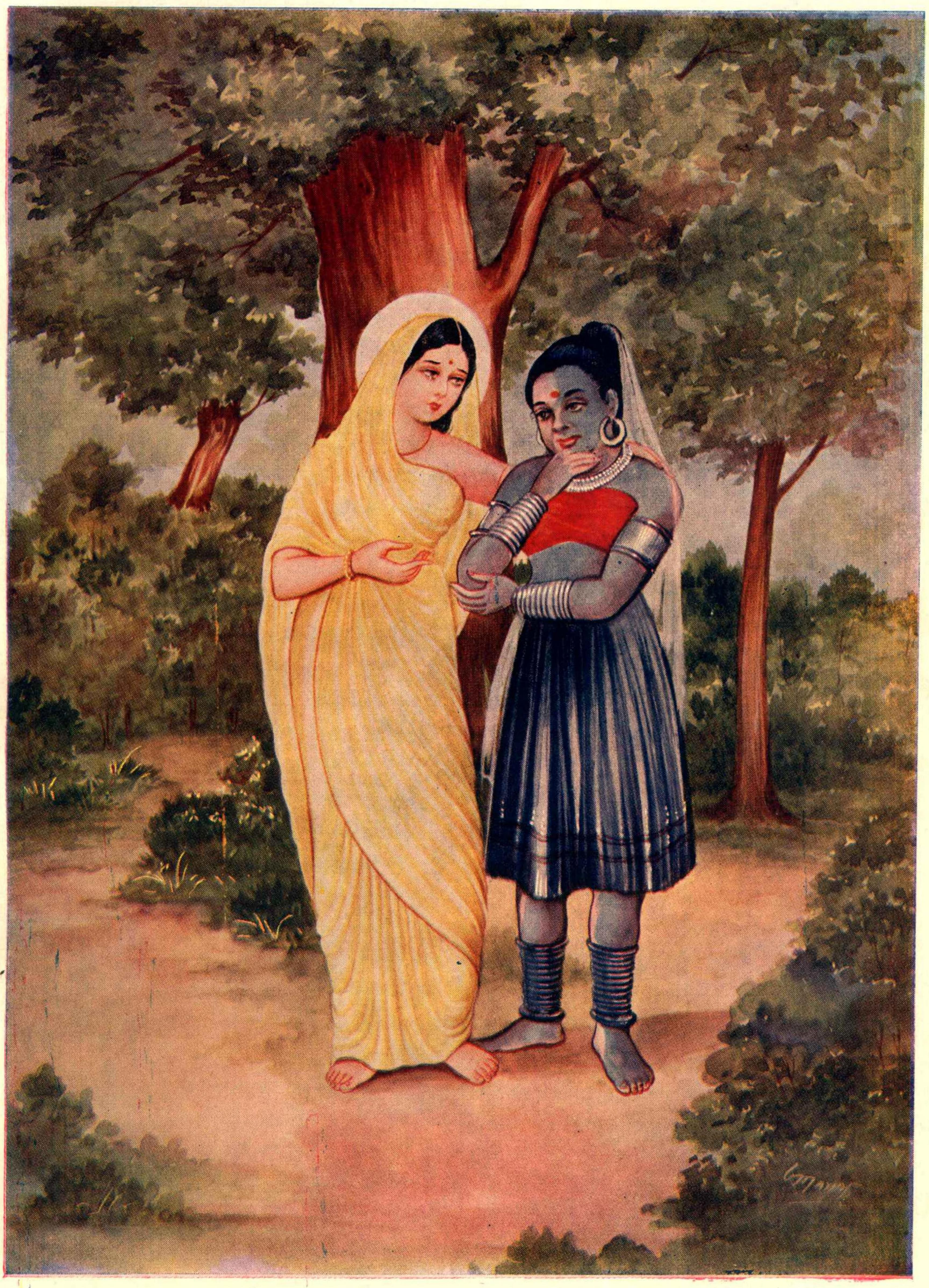
- Sita with Sarama (right)
- Affiliation: Queen Consort of Lanka
- Gender: Female

Genealogy
- Spouse: Vibhishana
- Children: Trijata, Taranisen

In the Hindu epic Ramayana, Sarama (Sanskrit: सरमा, Saramā) is the wife of Vibhishana, the brother of Ravana, the demon (rakshasa) king of Lanka. Sometimes, she is described as a rakshasi (demoness), at other times, she is said to have gandharva (celestial dancers) lineage. All accounts agree that Sarama was friendly to Sita, the consort of Rama (the prince of Ayodhya and an avatar of the god Vishnu), who was kidnapped by Ravana and imprisoned in Lanka. Like her husband who sides with Rama in the war against Ravana, Sarama is kind to Sita and aids Rama. Sarama and Vibhishana had a daughter called Trijata.

== Relation with Sita ==
According to Camille Bulcke (an expert on Rama-centric literature), Sarama does not appear in the original Ramayana. However, later interpolations – present in all recensions – added to the text of Valmiki mention her. She first appears in the episode of Maya-shirsa, the illusory head of Rama. Ravana has abducted Sita, the wife of Rama, the prince of Ayodhya and repeatedly urges her to marry him, however Sita flatly refuses each time. After Rama with his vanara army lands on Lanka, Ravana asks his magician Vidyujihva to create an illusory severed head of Rama and his bow to convince Sita of Rama's death. The magician complies and presents the head and bow to Sita in the Ashoka Vatika, where she is imprisoned. Sita laments in presence of Ravana seeing the head of her "dead" husband. Soon, Ravana leaves for a meeting with his ministers and the head and the bow disappear after his departure. Sarama comes close to Sita and exposes Ravana's trickery to Sita. She says that she secretly witnessed the trick of Ravana and the head was just a product of magic. She also informs Sita that Rama has arrived in Lanka with his army headed by Sugriva and she has seen Rama with her own eyes. She asks Sita if she can pass on any message to Rama on Sita's behalf. Sita instead requests Sarama to probe the plans Ravana had for her. Sarama finds out and informs Sita that despite the advice of his mother and wise aged ministers, Ravana refused to hand over Sita to Rama. Sarama is described as "lovely companion" and friend of Sita.

The Northern recension adds another episode about Sarama. A canto called Sarama-vakyam ("conversation with Sarama") narrates how Sarama informs Sita about the burning of Lanka by Hanuman. This episode appears before Rama comes to Lanka, when he had sent Hanuman to locate where the kidnapped Sita is.

== Association with Vibhishana ==
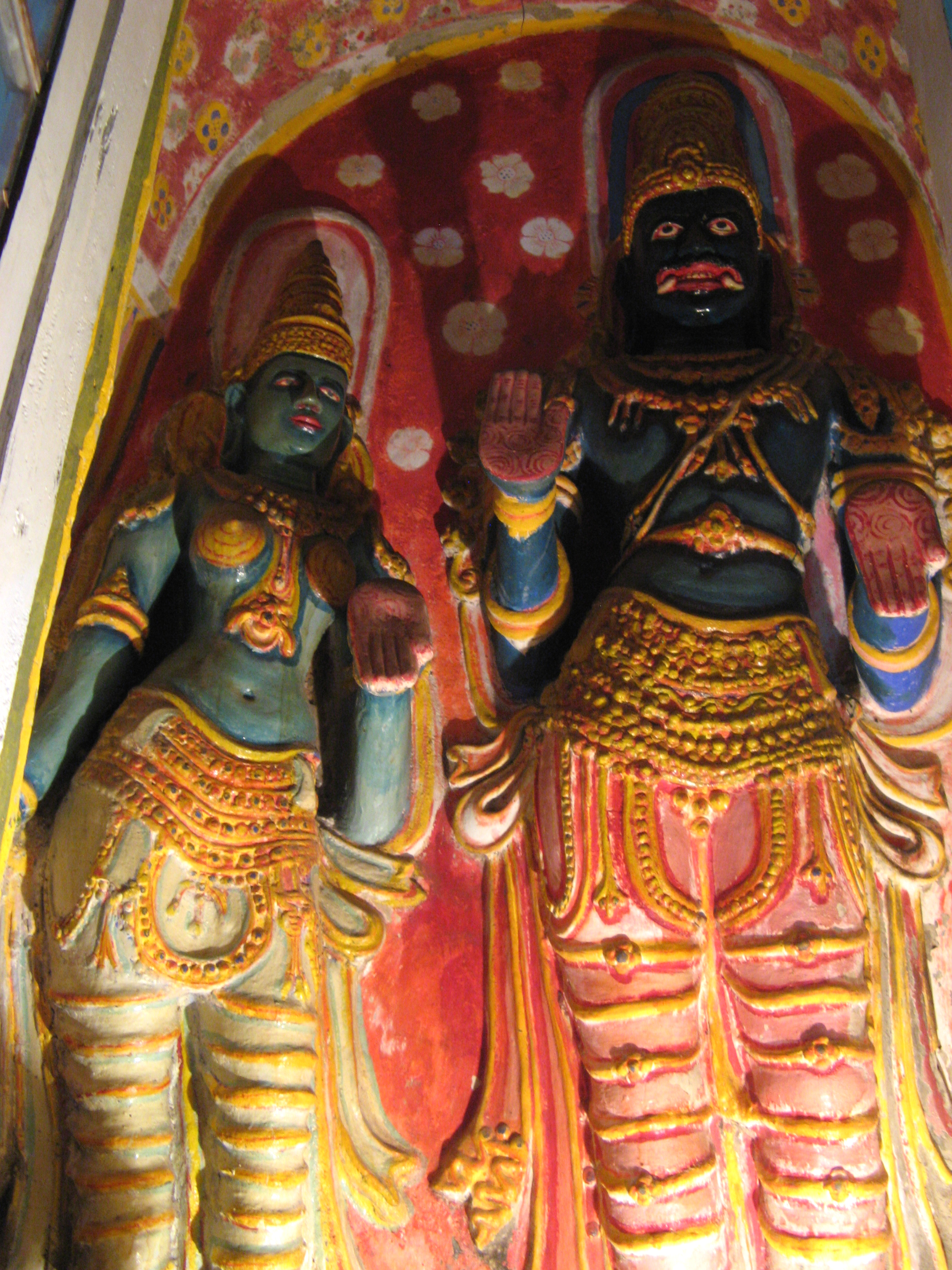
Vibhishana depicted with his consort Sarama.

Neither in the illusory head scene or the Sarama-vakyam indicate any relationship between Sarama and Vibhishana. The only mention of the unnamed Vibhishana's wife is when Sita mentions about her to Hanuman, where he tracks her in Lanka and meets her. Sita tells him that the wife of Vibhishana – who sides with Rama in the war – sent her daughter Kala (In other recensions of the Ramayana, called Nanda or Anala) to give information of Ravana's intentions about not surrendering Sita to Rama, despite the advice of Vibhishana and Ravana's old and wise minister Avindhya.

Four benefactors of Sita emerge in the Ramayana – the unnamed Vibhisana's wife, Kala, Trijata and Sarama. Over time in later Rama-centric literature, Sarama was identified as Vibhishana's wife while Trijata was regarded his daughter.

Sarama's identification with Vibhishana's wife is introduced quite early, in the Uttra Kanda, the last Book of the Ramayana itself, which is regarded as a later addition to the original text. It mentions that Ravana obtained Sarama, the daughter of the gandharva Sailusa, to be his brother Vibhishana's wife. Sarama was born on the banks of the Manas Lake. Seeing the waters of the lake rise, the infant started crying. Her mother commanded the lake, Saroma vardhata ("Lake, do not rise"), so the child was named Sarama.

== Post-Ramayana literature ==
In post-Ramayana literature, Trijata, the daughter of Sarama and Vibhishana, acquires a greater role. In some adaptions, she replaces Sarama in both episodes attributed to her mother in the original epic. However, the Krittivasi Ramayana portrays Trijata in bad light appealing to Sita to wed Ravana and rule as the queen of Lanka. This Bengali adaptation emphasizes on friendship of Sarama and Sita. In a playful pun, Sita tells Sarama, "I am Rama, and thus, you are called Sarama, because of me". The Ranganatha Ramayana and the Tattvasamgraha Ramayana credit Sarama as the one who points the location of the yajna, which would have made Ravana invincible, to the army of Rama so they can destroy it.

The Ananda Ramayana narrates that after Rama's victory in the war over Ravana both Sarama and Trijata went to Ayodhya in the Pushpaka vimana, Ravana's aerial chariot. Later, when Sita visits Lanka, she says to Sarama to treat Trijata like she is Sita.

In the Telugu Sita Puranamu, Ramaswami Chaudari portrays Sarama negatively as the Aryan (gandharva) wife of the Dravidian Vibhishana, who sways her husband's opinion towards Rama and forces him to betray his just brother Ravana.
