= Seetha Amman Temple =

Hindu temple in Sri Lanka

Seethai Amman Temple
- சீதஎலிய சீதையம்மன் கோவில் සීතඑළිය සීතා අම්මන් දේවස්ථානය
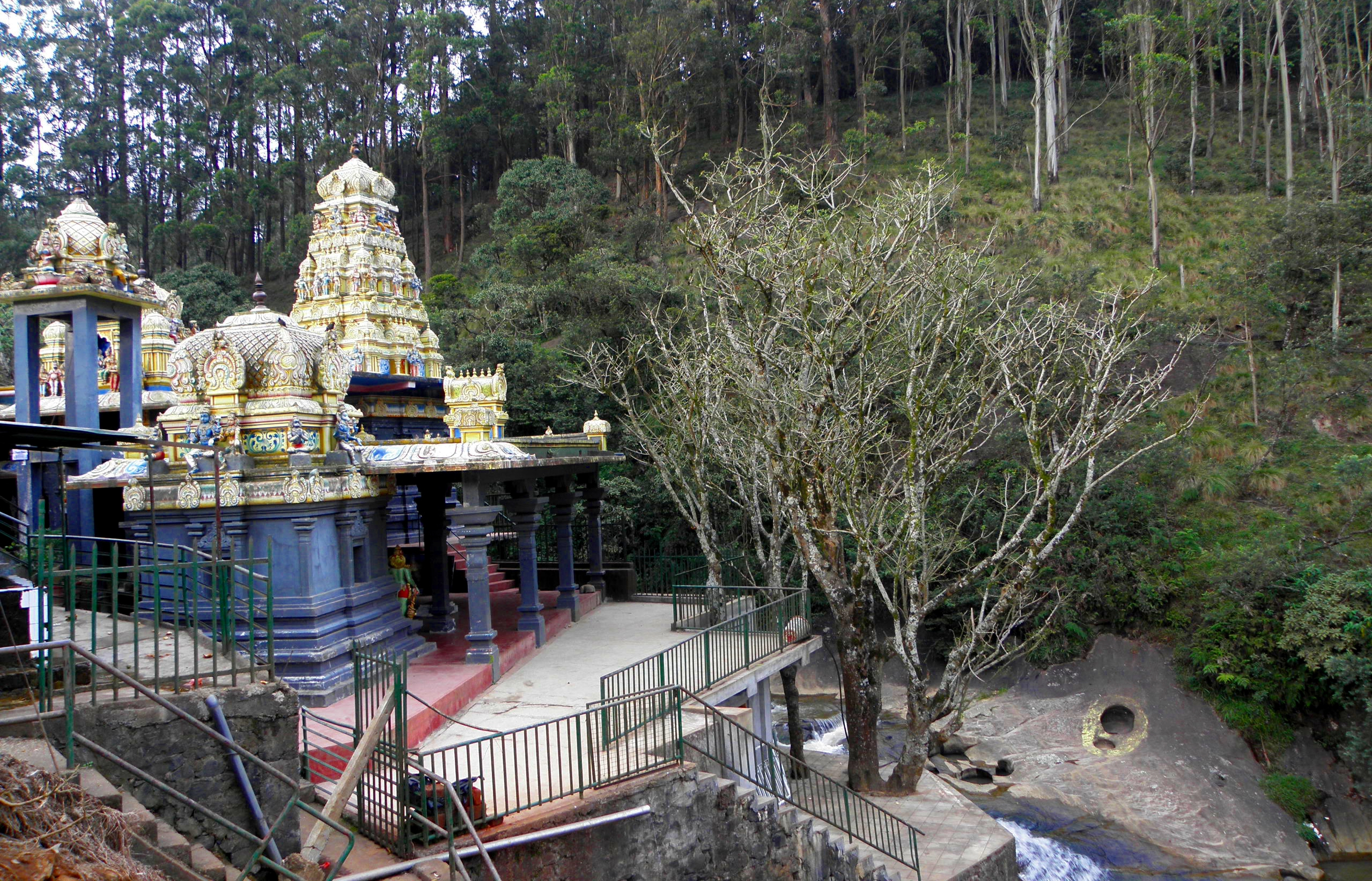
- by Buddhika Mawella 2010

- Location within Sri Lanka

Religion
- Affiliation: Hinduism
- District: Nuwara Eliya
- Province: Central Province
- Deity: Sita

Location
- Location: Sita Eliya
- Country: Sri Lanka
- Coordinates: 6.9332°N 80.8105°E

Architecture
- Type: Hindu Temple
- Style: Tamil Architecture
- Completed: Late 20th century(established) early 21 century (completed)
- Direction of façade: East

Seetha Amman Temple, also called Seetha Eliya, Seethai Amman Thirukkovil, Ashok Vatika Sita Temple, is a Hindu temple located in the Sita Eliya village in the Nuwara Eliya District of Central Sri Lanka. The temple's folklore is deeply connected to the Hindu epic, the Ramayana. According to the epic, after Sita was abducted by King Ravana of Lanka, she was brought to this location. Ravana sought vengeance against Rama and Lakshmana to avenge the disrespect shown to his sister, Shurpanakha.

In the Ramayana, Ravana offered Sita a place in his palace, but she refused, choosing instead to remain in exile, waiting for Rama to rescue her. Ravana then created a natural garden, now known as Hakgala Botanical Garden, near the temple where Sita could wait. The nearby river is said to be the place where Sita bathed under the guard of Asura women and meditated until Rama's arrival. It is also believed to be the site where Hanuman first met Sita and gave her Rama's wedding ring as a sign of hope.This temple is believed to be the only Sita temple in the world.

Initially, this site featured a simple temple with stones representing Rama, Lakshmana, and Sita. When Indian Tamils arrived as indentured workers brought by the British, they constructed the current temple. To this day, the temple is maintained by the Indian Tamils of Sri Lanka, rather than the native Sri Lankan Tamils. It is primarily visited by Indians as a pilgrimage to one of the Ramayana Sthalas.

== Location ==
Sita Eliya Sita Temple is located 5 km (3.1 mi) from the town of Nuwara Eliya on the way to Kandy. Approximately 1.7 km (1.1 mi) southeast of the temple lies Hakgala Botanical Garden, believed to be the garden created by Ravana for Sita according to the Ramayana.

== Legend ==
Seetha Eliya Seethai Amman Thirukkovil, also known as Ashok Vatika Sita Temple, is believed to be the site where Sita was held captive by the Rakshasa king Ravana, according to the Hindu epic, the Ramayana. Sita prayed daily for her husband Rama to rescue her from this place. The temple is located in the Nuwara Eliya District of Central Sri Lanka and is surrounded by significant mythological landmarks.

Near the temple runs a stream, said to have been formed to meet the needs of Sita Devi during her captivity at Ashok Vatika. It is believed that Sita bathed in this stream. On the rock face across the stream are circular depressions, which are regarded as the footprints of Hanuman. According to the Ramayana, Hanuman met Sita at this location and gave her Rama's wedding ring as a sign of hope. Additionally, Ravana had created a natural garden, now known as Hakgala Botanical Garden, for Sita to wait for Rama's arrival. This site, rich in mythological significance, continues to attract devotees and tourists who revere the story of Sita's devotion and endurance.

Ramayana Related Places in Sri Lanka

== Significance ==
The place has been considered as the place where Sita was held captive, according to the local legends. About a century ago, three Idols, one of which was of Sita was found near the river bank. Along with the higher concentration of the thick Ashoka forest (Ashoka Vana) in the region, which according to Ramayana version where Sita was captivated, made the shrine popular.

There has been some controversy regarding the expansion of the temple by the Sri Lankan tourism ministry in the 2000s. Right wing groups like the Buddhist Singhala Veera Vidhana, opposed the project as an increased Indian devotees foot print may turn the place to a stronghold of Tamil politics.

In 2021, water from the sacred Sarju river was flown from India to Srilanka for the Kumbhabhishekam (consecration) of the temple. A stone from the Sita Eliya village was taken in 2021 for the construction of the Ayodhya Ram temple. The stone was bought from Sri Lanka to India by the Sri Lankan High Commissioner to India, Milinda Moragoda.

== Temple Structure ==
The main temple is dedicated to Sita. There isnan another temple dedicated to Hanuman. There is also a small shrine near the river bank where three darkened idols was found a century ago.

=== Ashok Vatika Meditation Centre ===
Its foundation stone was laid on April 2023 by the Sri Lankan Prime Minister Dinesh Gunawardena and the High Commissioner of India to Sri Lanka Gopal Baglay. In August 2025, the centre was inaugurated by the Sri Lanakan Minister of Foreign Affairs, Foreign Employment and Tourism Vijitha Herath and High Commissioner of India to Sri Lanka Santhosh Jha.
