= Athithi =

Athithi may refer to

- Athidhi (2007 film), a 2007 Telugu film directed by Surender Reddy
- Athithi (2014 film), a Tamil film directed by Bharathan
- Son of Kusha (Ramayana)

== See also ==
- Atithi (disambiguation)
