= Atithi (Ramayana) =

Grandson of Rama and Sita

- King of Kosala
- Predecessor: Kusha
- Successor: Nishada
- Dynasty: Raghuvamsha-Suryavamsha
- Father: Kusha
- Mother: Kumudvati

Atithi (Sanskrit: अतिथि, IAST: Atithi) is the son of Kusha, and grandson of Rama and Sita in the Hindu epic Ramayana. He ruled over the Koshala kingdom after the reign of Kusha, and was succeeded by his son Nishada.

Description of Atithi and his lineage is available in the Sanskrit epic Raghuvamsha and in the Ananda Ramayana.

== See also ==
- Raghuvamsha
- Ananda Ramayana
