= Kusha (Ramayana) =

Legendary son of Rama and Sita

- King of Dakshina Kosala
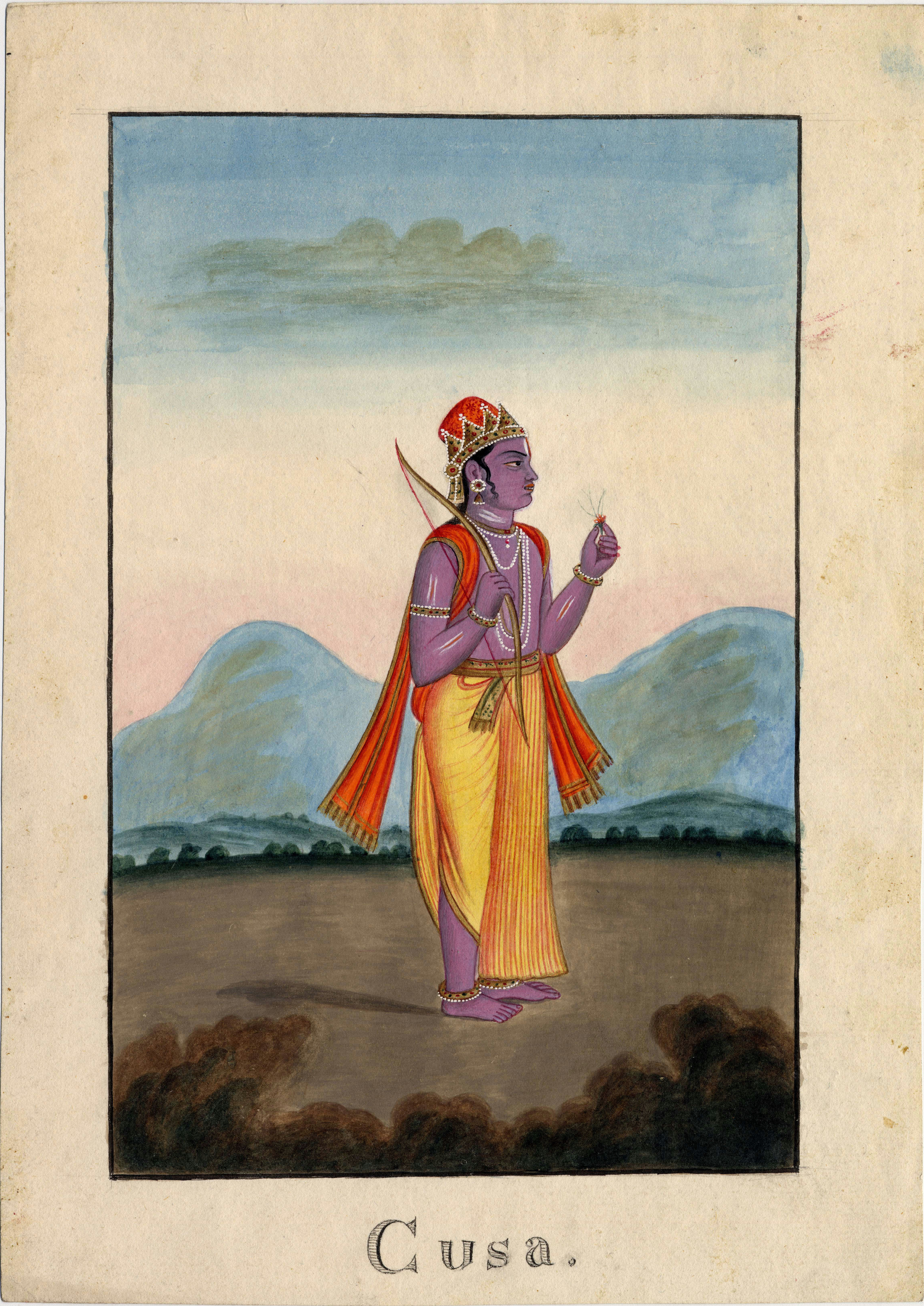
- Kusha, one of the twin sons of Rama and Sita.
- Spouse: Kumudvatī and Champika (according to Ananda Ramayana)
- Issue: Atithi
- Dynasty: Suryavamsha
- Father: Rama
- Mother: Sita

Kusha (Sanskrit: कुश, IAST: Kuśa) is the elder of the twin sons of Rama and Sita in the Hindu epic Ramayana. His younger twin brother is Lava.

According to tradition, the Ramayana was first recited to Kusha and Lava by its composer, Valmiki, and the brothers popularised the epic by traveling and reciting it. Following the death of Rama, Kusha succeeded him to rule the southern region of Kosala, where he established a new capital city named Kushasthali.

According to the Raghuvamsha, Kusha married Kumudvati, daughter of the naga-chief Kumuda, who bore him a son named Atithi.

== Legend ==
=== Birth ===
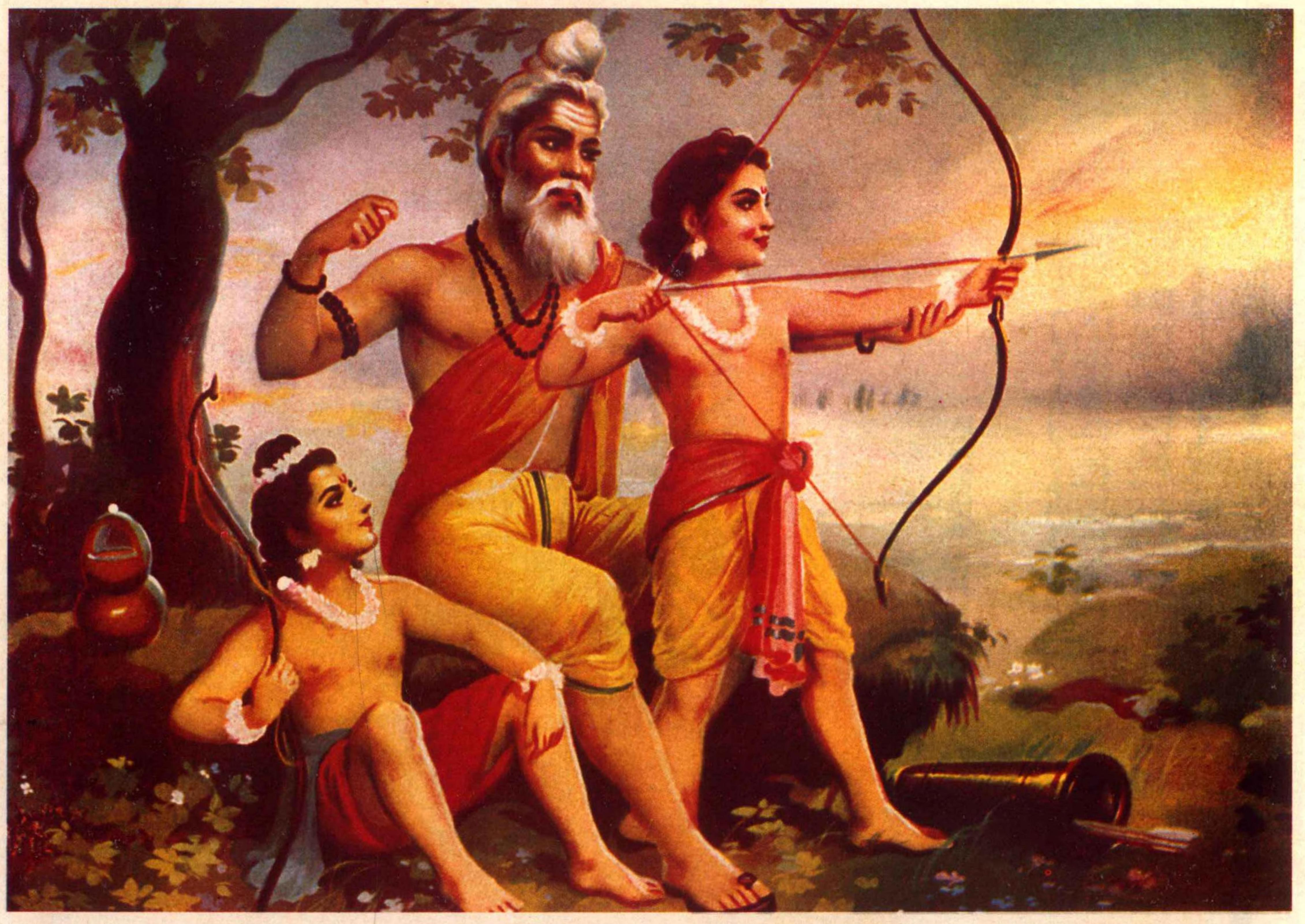
Valmiki trains Lava and Kusha in archery

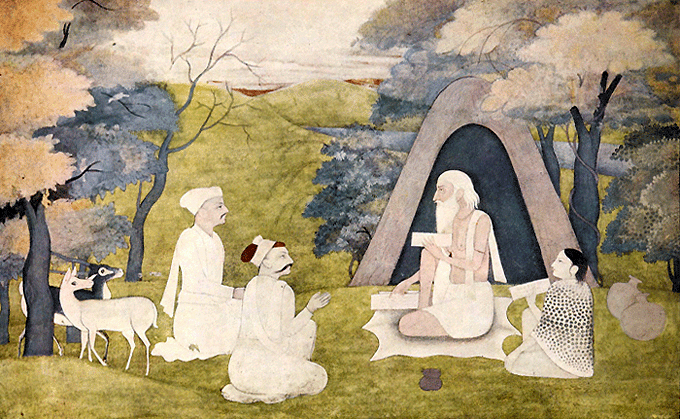
Valmiki recites the Ramayana to Kusha and Lava

In the Uttara Kanda, Rama instructs his brother Lakshmana to leave behind a pregnant Sita at the hermitage of the sage Valmiki, due to public condemnation of his keeping her as his queen despite her captivity by Ravana at Lanka. Sita gave birth to twin sons, Kusha and Lava, at the ashram, where they were educated and trained in military skills under the tutelage of the sage.

The Kathasaritasagara offers a different account regarding Kusha's birth. According to this text, while Sita was away from the hermitage to bathe Lava, Valmiki noticed the boy's absence. Fearing that the boy was dead and that the news would distress Sita, Valmiki created Kusha from kusha grass.

=== Ashvamedha Yajna ===
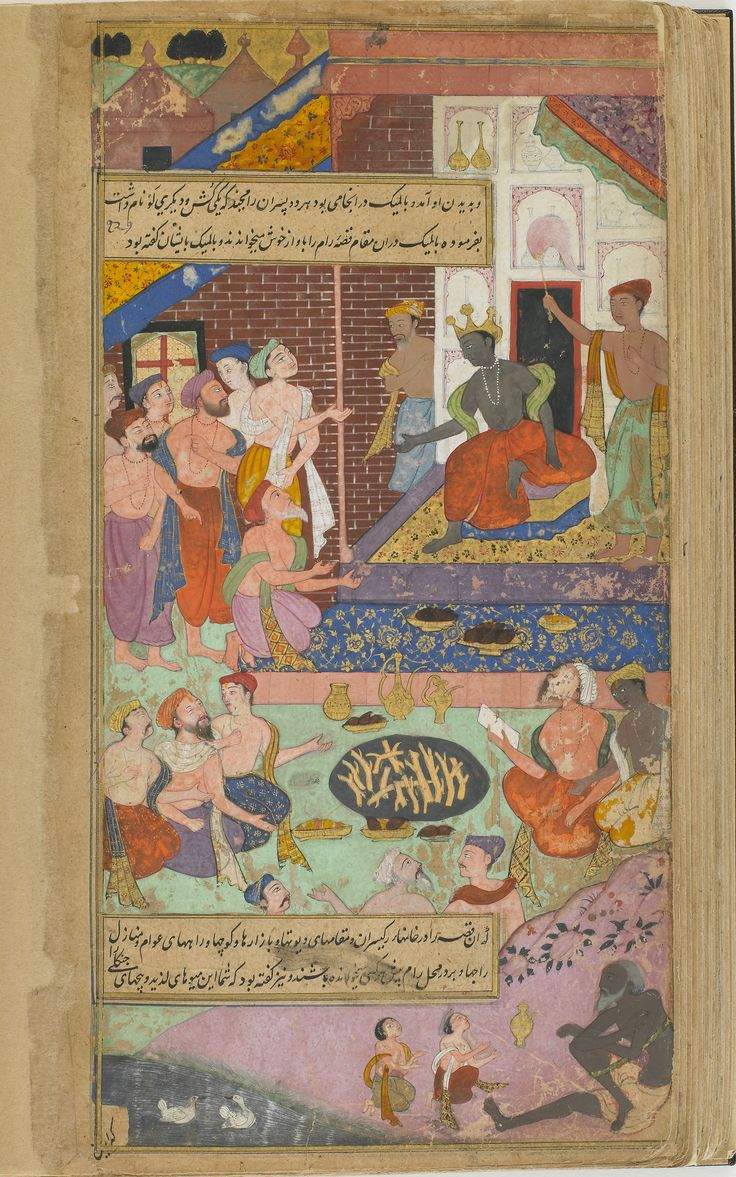
Valmiki instructs Kusha and Lava to recite the Ramayana before the occasion of a sacrifice in Rama's pavilion

Sage Valmiki, along with Lava and Kusha and a disguised Sita, attend an ashvamedha yajna held by Rama.

Valmiki commands Lava and Kusha to chant the Ramayana in the presence of Rama and a vast audience in the sacrificial pavilion. Their resemblance to Rama is noted by the ascetics. The twins refuse a reward of gold pieces for their recitation, declaring grain and fruits to suffice for them in the forest. Recognising his sons, Rama orders them and Sita to appear before him in the assembly, seeking reconciliation. During this occasion, he formally acknowledges the twins to be his sons. He anoints them his heirs before his death.

In some versions of the epic and the Padma Purana, Lava and Kusha capture the horse of the sacrifice and defeat Rama's brothers and their army. Sita intervenes and unites the father and sons.

=== Ananda Ramayana ===
Cantos sixteen to nineteen of the Ānanda Rāmāyaṇa describe the exploits of Rama's progeny. The manifestation of a goddess appears before Kusha, declaring to be the tutelary deity of the ancient capital of Ayodhya. She describes the condition of the deserted city, which had been abandoned and ruined since King Rama became inactive for some time. Kusha sets forth with his whole army to restore the city to its former splendour.

Canto seventeen describes the final years of Kusha. Kusha and Kumudvati have a son named Atithi, who becomes heir to the kingdom; Cantos eighteen and nineteen describe the 21 Kings that succeeded Atithi.
