= Sita Eliya =

Coordinates: 6°56′N 80°48′E

- Village
- Interactive map of Sita Eliya
- Country: Sri Lanka
- Province: Central Province
- Time zone: UTC+5:30 (Sri Lanka Standard Time)

Sita Eliya or Seetha Eliya is a village in Sri Lanka. It is located within Central Province.

== Places of interest ==
=== Seetha Amman Temple ===
The Seetha Amman Temple is believed to be the site where Sita was held captive by Ravana, and where she prayed daily for Rama to come and rescue her in the Hindu epic, Ramayana.

== See also ==
- List of towns in Central Province, Sri Lanka
