= Simsapa tree =

Tree in Buddhist discourse

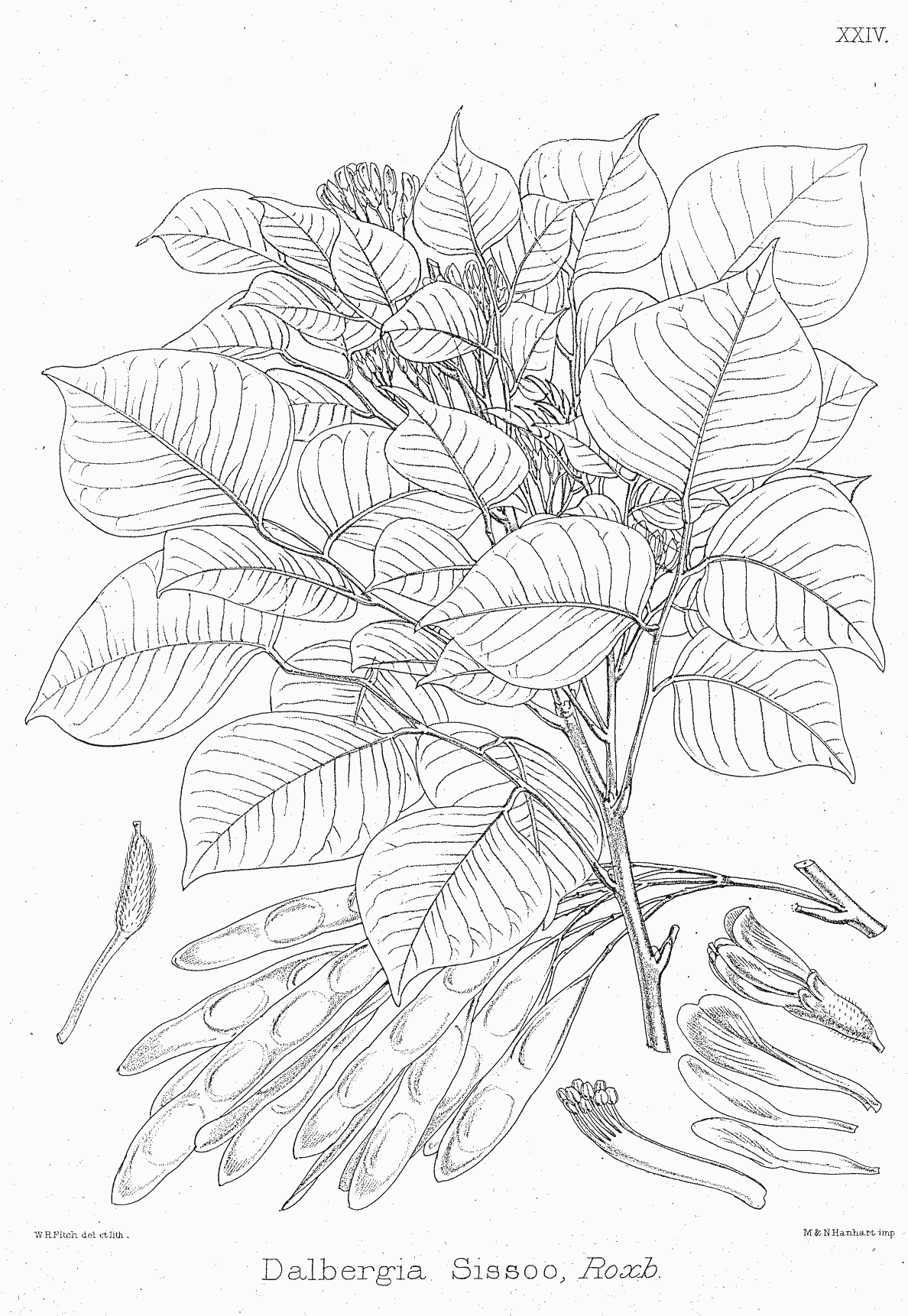
Dalbergia sissoo

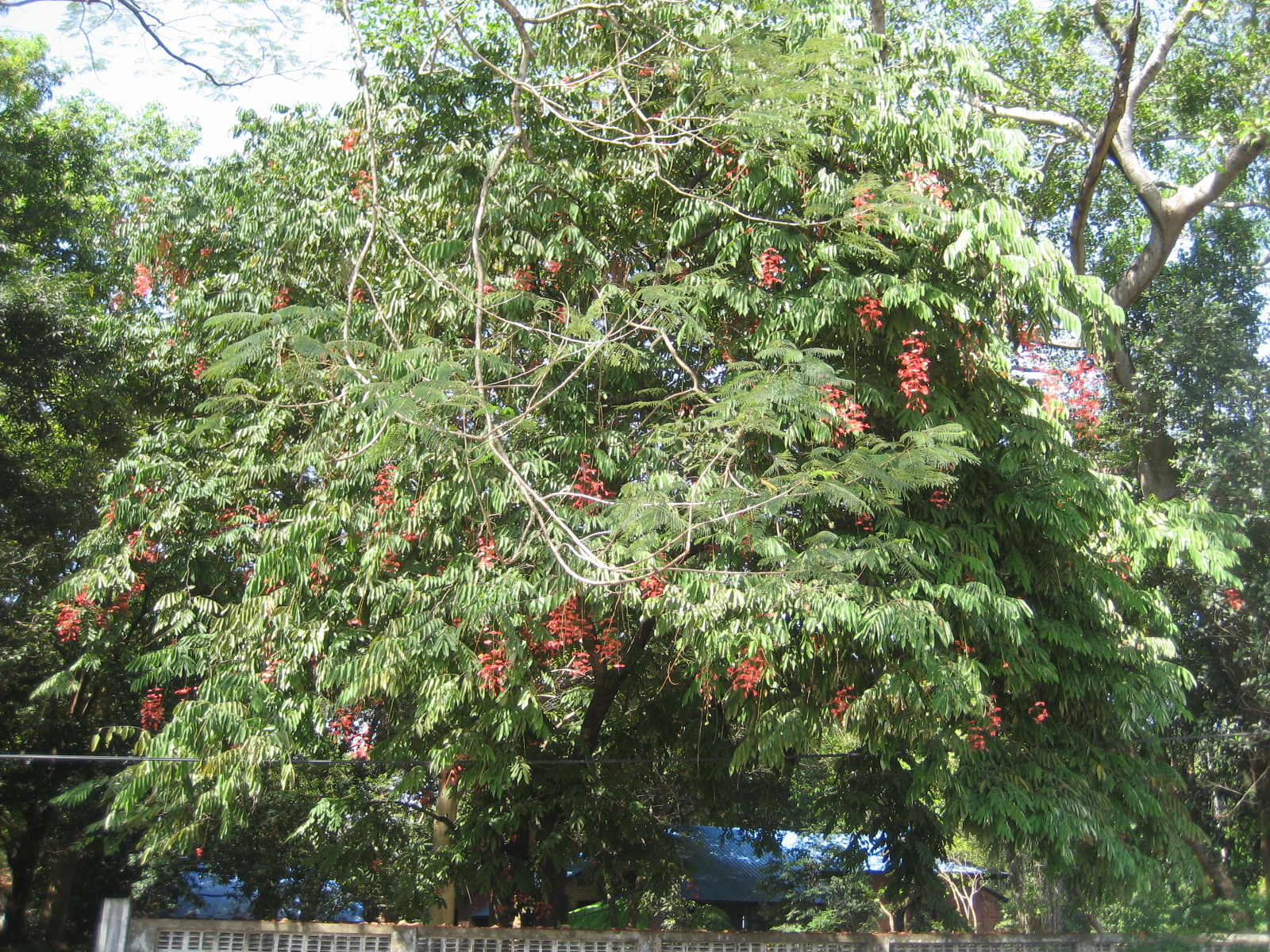
Amherstia nobilis

The Simsapa tree (Pali: siṃsapā) is mentioned in ancient Hindu texts including Ramayana, Itihasa-Purana, Vyākaraṇa texts and Buddhist discourses traditionally believed to have been delivered 2,500 years ago. The tree has been identified as either Dalbergia sissoo, a rosewood tree common to India and Southeast Asia, or Amherstia nobilis, another South Asian tree, of the family Caesalpiniaceae.

== In Hindu Texts ==
The Simsapa tree is prominently mentioned in Valmiki’s Ramayana, Sundara Kanda, Sarga 14. Hanuman climbs a golden Simsapa tree in the Ashoka grove of Lanka to conceal himself while searching for Sita. This episode highlights the tree as a vantage point and a symbol of vigilance and resilience. The tree is referenced in several Purāṇic texts as a sacred site of divine encounters. The tree is often associated with auspiciousness and resilience; sometimes linked to Hanuman’s dialogue with Sita since she is referred to sit under it in Ashoka vanam.

In Somadeva’s Kathasaritsagara, the Simsapa tree appears as the location where King Trivikramasena repeatedly encounters the Vetala spirit hanging from corpses. The tree functions as a threshold between the human and supernatural realms, symbolizing trials and endurance. Vyakarana texts, the works on Sanskrit grammar and lexicon traditions occasionally reference the Simsapa tree as an example word, reflecting its cultural familiarity in classical literature.

== Buddhist references ==
In Buddhism's Pali Canon, there is a discourse entitled, "The Simsapa Grove" (Samyutta Nikaya 56.31). This discourse is described as having been delivered by the Buddha to monks while dwelling beneath a simsapa grove in the city of Kosambi. In this discourse, the Buddha compares a few simsapa leaves in his hand with the number of simsapa leaves overhead in the grove to illustrate what he teaches (in particular, the Four Noble Truths) and what he does not teach (things unrelated to the holy life).

Elsewhere in the Pali Canon, simsapa groves are mentioned in the "Payasi Sutta" (Digha Nikaya 23) and the "Hatthaka Discourse" (Anguttara Nikaya 3.34).

== See also ==
- Ashoka tree

== Sources ==
- Bodhi, Bhikkhu (trans., ed.) (2000). The Connected Discourses of the Buddha: A Translation of the Samyutta Nikaya. Boston: Wisdom Publications. ISBN 0-86171-331-1.
- Rhys Davids, T.W. & William Stede (eds.) (1921-5). The Pali Text Society’s Pali–English Dictionary. Chipstead: Pali Text Society. A general online search engine for the PED is available at http://dsal.uchicago.edu/dictionaries/pali/.
- Thanissaro Bhikkhu (trans.) (1997). Simsapa Sutta: The Simsapa Leaves (SN 56.31). Retrieved 16 Nov 2008 from "Access to Insight" at http://www.accesstoinsight.org/tipitaka/sn/sn56/sn56.031.than.html.
- Thanissaro Bhikkhu (trans.) (1999). Hatthaka Sutta: To Hatthaka (on Sleeping Well in the Cold Forest) (excerpt) (AN 3.34). Retrieved 16 Nov 2008 from "Access to Insight" at http://www.accesstoinsight.org/tipitaka/an/an03/an03.034.than.html.
- Walshe, Maurice O'C. (trans.) (1985). Samyutta Nikaya: An Anthology (Part III) (Wheel Nos. 318-321). Kandy: Buddhist Publication Society. Retrieved 16 Nov 2008 from "Access to Insight" (2007) at http://www.accesstoinsight.org/lib/authors/walshe/wheel318.html.
- Walshe, Maurice (1987/1995). The Long Discourses of the Buddha: A Translation of the Digha Nikaya. Boston: Wisdom Publications. ISBN 0-86171-103-3.
