= Athidhi (disambiguation) =

Athidhi may refer to:

- Athidhi (2007 film), a 2007 Telugu action thriller film
- Athidhi (TV series), a 2023 Telugu horror thriller television series

== People ==
- Atithi (disambiguation)
- Aditi Rao Hydari, Indian actress
