= Achena Atithi =

Achena Atithi (lit. 'unknown guest') may refer to these Indian films:

- Achena Atithi (1973 film), a 1973 Bengali film
- Achena Atithi (1997 film), a 1997 Bengali film

== See also ==
- Atithi (disambiguation)
