= Atithi =

Atithi (lit. 'guest' in Indian languages) may refer to:

- Atithi (1965 film), a 1965 Bengali film
- Atithee, a 1978 Hindi film
- Atithi (2002 film), a 2002 Kannada film
- Atithi (2007 film), a 2007 Telugu film

== See also ==
- Athithi (disambiguation)
- Athidhi (disambiguation)
- Achena Atithi (disambiguation)
