= Ashoka Vatika =

Legendary garden described in the Ramayana

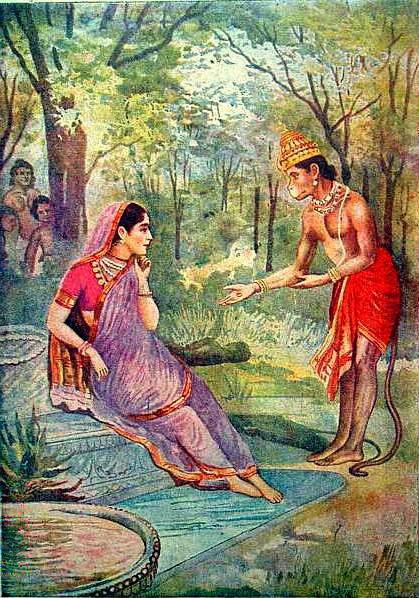
Hanuman encounters Sita in the Ashoka Vatika, bazaar art, early 1900s

Ashoka Vatika (Sanskrit: अशोकवाटिका, romanized: Aśokavāṭikā) is a grove in Lanka that is located in the kingdom of the rakshasa king Ravana. It is mentioned in the Vishnu Purana and the Hindu epic Ramayana of Valmiki, and all subsequent versions, including the Ramacharitamanas written by Tulsidas, where it finds mention in the Sundara Kanda. The Vatika has garden houses around it, built by Vishvakarma himself.

== Literature ==
It was the location where Sita, the wife of Rama, was held captive by Ravana after her abduction, also because she refused to stay in Ravana's palace and preferred to stay under a simsapa tree in Ashoka Vatika. It was here that Ravana's wife Mandodari came to meet her and also where Hanuman met her for the first time, and identified himself with the finger ring of Rama.

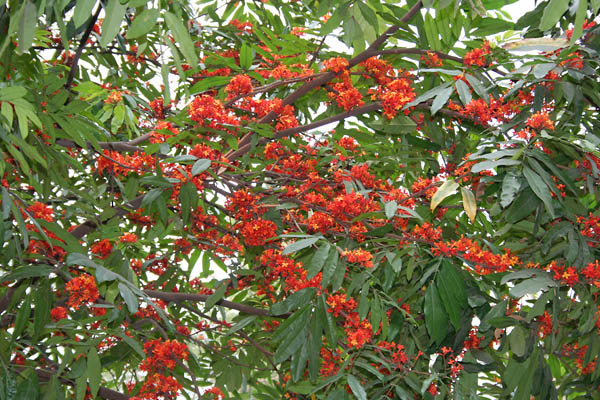
Ashoka tree (Saraca asoca), often known as Sita-Ashoka owing to its connection with the Ramayana

Sita stayed at Ashoka Vatika until the end of the epic battle between Rama and Ravana, which resulted in the destruction of Ravana himself and most of this clan. Much of the Ashoka Vatika was destroyed by Hanuman when he first visited Lanka searching for Sita. Also destroyed was the Pramda Vana at the centre of the Ashoka Vatika.

== Identification ==
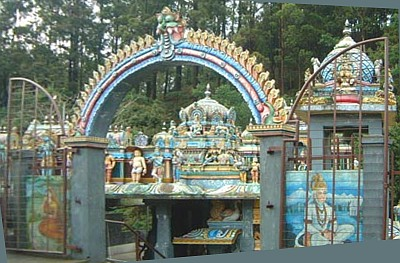
Hindu temple called "Seetha Kovil" (Hanuman Kovil) at Seeta Eliya village, close to Hakgala Botanical Garden

Its present location is believed to be the Hakgala Botanical Garden, in the area known as Seetha Eliya, close to the resort city of Nuwara Eliya. The garden is situated at the base of the Hakgala Rock forms, has Sita Pokuna, a barren area atop the Hakgala Rock Jungle, where Sita was supposedly held captive; the Sita Amman Temple is located here. Another connected site is a spot where Sita bathed in a stream at Sita Eliya, called Sita Jharna. The site has attracted media interest in recent years owing to its connection with Hindu mythology.
