= Vanar, Arizona =

- Populated place
- Location within the state of Arizona Vanar (the United States)
- Coordinates: 32°14′28″N 109°05′42″W
- Country: United States
- State: Arizona
- County: Cochise
- Elevation: 3,918 ft (1,194 m)
- Time zone: UTC-7 (Mountain (MST))
  - Summer (DST): UTC-7 (MST)
- Area code: 520
- FIPS code: 04-79240
- GNIS feature ID: 24673

Vanar was a station on the Southern Pacific railroad and populated place situated in Cochise County, Arizona, United States, adjacent to the border with New Mexico. The community was originally named Vanarman after Hiram M. Van Arman, and the name was shortened for telegraph purposes in 1905 to Vanar.

The station was along the railroad's route through eastern Arizona, constructed in 1880. One of the railroad's work camps was located there. Once a junction was made in March 1881 with eastern rails in Deming, New Mexico, the line was the second transcontinental rail route across the United States.

As of 1915, there was a retail store located there. The following year a post office was established there.
