= Kakabhushundi =

Sage featured in Hinduism

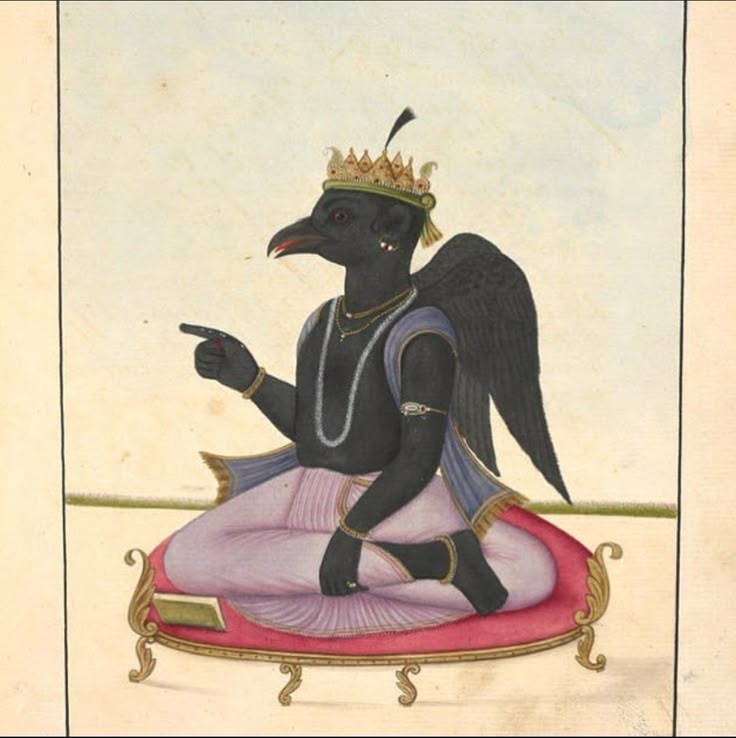
- Painting depicting Kakabhushundi
- Affiliation: Chiranjivi
- Texts: Ramacharitamanas, Yoga Vasishtha

Kakabhushundi (Sanskrit: काकभुशुण्डि, romanized: Kākabhuśuṇḍi), also rendered Bhushundi, is a sage featured in Hindu literature. He is one of the characters of the Rāmacaritamānas, an Awadhi poem about the deity Rama by the saint Tulsidas.

Kakabhushundi is depicted as a devotee of Rama, who narrates the story of the Ramayana to Garuda in the form of a crow. He is described to be a Chiranjivi, an immortal being in Hinduism who is to remain alive on earth until the end of the current Kali Yuga.

Kakabhushundi is also the central character in The Story of Bhushunda, which appears in the Yoga Vasishtha.

== Etymology ==
Kākā is a Sanskrit word for a crow, while bhuśuṇḍi is a kind of a weapon.

== Legend ==
=== Ramacharitamanas ===
Kakabhushundi was originally a member of the Shudra class of Ayodhya. A zealous devotee of the deity Shiva, he held the deity Vishnu and Vaishnavas in contempt, despite his guru's efforts to discourage him from this mindset. Once, Kakabhushundi refused to offer his respects to his guru while he was engaged in prayer to Shiva in a temple. Angered, Shiva cursed his ungrateful devotee to take the form of a snake and live a thousand lives as a lesser creature. After his guru prayed to the deity to moderate the curse, Shiva stated that after his thousand cursed births, Kakabhushundi would become a devotee of Rama. The deity also warned him never to displease a preceptor ever again. Accordingly, following the cursed births, Kakabhushundi was born as a Brahmin, and grew to become a great follower of Rama and a sage. While listening to the discourse to a sage named Lomasha on the merits of nirguna (non-qualified Absolute) worship over that of saguna (qualified Absolute) worship of Brahman, he refused to accept these views. In his fury, Lomasha cursed him to become a crow.

The sage told Garuda that every Treta Yuga, he goes to Ayodhya and stays in the city for five years, watching the child Rama as a crow. Once, Rama tried to catch him with all the antics of an excited child. A moment of doubt regarding Rama's divinity occurred in the sage's mind. When Kakabhushundi soared towards the sky, he realised that the deity's fingers were always mere fingerbreadths away from him, even when he flew all the way to Brahmaloka. When he opened his eyes, he found himself back in Ayodhya amid the laughing child. He witnessed a cosmic vision in Rama's mouth, observing millions of suns and moons within millions of multiverse, and a vision of the sage himself in Ayodhya within each universe. He resided within each of these realms(multiverse) for centuries and returned from Rama's mouth to find himself returning to the same moment in time as he had left. Bewildered, he begged for salvation and was promptly blessed with the same by Rama. He chose to forever remain in the form of a crow as he had been blessed by his favoured deity in that form.

=== Yoga Vasistha ===
Kakabhushundi is a legendary immortal sage in the Yoga Vasistha, where he is named Bhusunda and appears in the form of a crow. He has survived innumerable cycles of cosmic creation and dissolution through yogic discipline and detachment.

==== Origin and nature ====
According to the Yoga Vāsiṣṭha, Bhusunda was born from the union of Chanda, a crow associated with the goddess Alambusha, and divine swans. He dwells on the branch of a kalpavṛkṣa (wish-fulfilling tree) located on Mount Meru, symbolizing stability amidst cosmic upheavals.

==== Encounter with Vasiṣṭha ====
In the Yoga Vāsiṣṭha, Vasiṣṭha visits Bhusunda and finds him seated in serene stillness upon the celestial tree. Bhusunda receives him with hospitality and explains the reasons for his extraordinary longevity and tranquility.

==== Immortality and wisdom ====
Bhusunda recounts that he has lived through countless kalpas (world-ages), witnessing events such as the Samudra Manthana (churning of the ocean) and battles between Devas and Asuras. Despite such upheavals, he remains calm and unattached, embodying detachment (Vairagya), contentment (Santosha), and equanimity (samattva).

==== Teachings on prāṇāyāma ====
Bhusunda attributes his stability to the practice of prāṇāyāma (breath regulation). He describes how the life-force (prāṇa) rises from the heart and extends beyond the body, while apāna moves in the reverse direction; their balance produces spontaneous breath suspension (kumbhaka). Mastery of this process leads to stillness of mind and realization of the Self (Brahman), which is liberation (Moksha).

==== Philosophical significance ====
Bhusunda is regarded as an archetype of the jīvanmukta—a being liberated while still alive. His abode on the wish-fulfilling tree, impervious to floods, fire, or cosmic destruction, symbolizes the unshakable consciousness of the realized sage. He attributes his enduring existence to both destiny (prārabdha) and the force of his yogic resolve.
