= Sundara Kanda =

Fifth book of the epic Ramayana

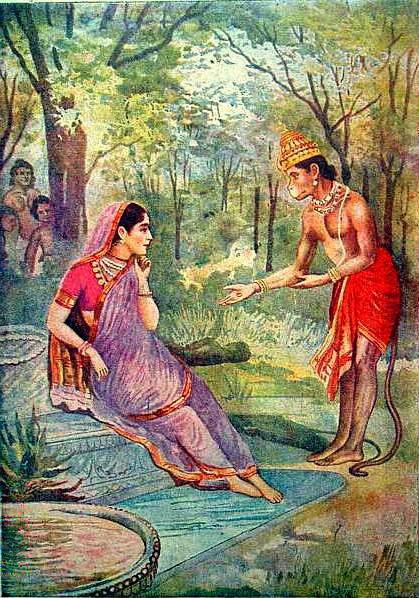
- Hanuman visiting Sita in Ashoka Vatika, bazaar art, early 1900s

Information
- Religion: Hinduism
- Author: Valmiki
- Language: Sanskrit

Sundara Kanda (Sanskrit: सुन्दरकाण्ड, romanized: Sundara Kāṇḍa, lit. 'beautiful chapter') is the fifth book in the Hindu epic Ramayana. The original Sundara Kanda is in Sanskrit, and was composed in popular tradition by Valmiki, who was the first to scripturally record the Ramayana. Sundara Kanda is the only chapter of the Ramayana in which the principal protagonist is not Rama, but Hanuman. The work depicts the adventures of Hanuman and his selflessness, strength, and devotion to Rama are emphasised in the text. Hanuman is believed to have been fondly called "Sundara" by his mother Anjani, and Sage Valmiki is stated to have chosen this name over others as the Sundara Kanda is about Hanuman's journey to Lanka.

Preceded by Kishkindha Kanda	Ramayana Kandas	Succeeded by Yuddha Kanda

== Summary ==
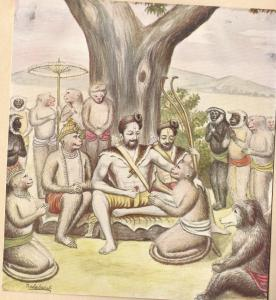
Maruti returns from Lanka.

The Sundara Kanda forms the heart of Valmiki's Ramayana and consists of a detailed, vivid account of Hanuman's adventures. After learning about Sita, Hanuman assumes a gargantuan form and makes a colossal leap across the ocean to Lanka after defeating Surasa, the mother of the nagas, and Simhika, who is sent by the devatas.

In Lanka, Hanuman searches for Sita, and finally finds her in the Ashoka Vatika.

In the Ashoka Vatika, Sita is wooed and threatened by Ravana and his rakshasi mistresses to marry Ravana. Hanuman discloses himself to Sita as Rama's messenger. Hanuman reassures her, giving Rama's signet ring as a sign of good faith. He offers to carry Sita back to Rama; however, she refuses, reluctant to allow herself to be rescued by any one other than her husband. She says that Rama himself must come and avenge the insult of her abduction.

Hanuman then wreaks havoc in Lanka by destroying trees and buildings, and kills Ravana's warriors. He allows himself to be captured and produced before Ravana. He gives a bold lecture to Ravana to release Sita. He is condemned and his tail is set on fire, but he escapes his bonds and, leaping from roof to roof, sets fire to Ravana's citadel, and makes the giant leap back from the island. The joyous search party returns to Kishkindha with the news.

== The act of reading ==
It is traditional to begin the reading (pārāyaṇa) of the Ramayana with the Sundara Kanda.

This lesson is recited by Hindus, preferably on Tuesdays or Saturdays, these days having been earmarked for special prayers to Hanuman. It happens to be for nullification of the malefic effects of the crow-mounted son of Surya and Chhaya (shadow), Shani. Ramayana reveals that Shani, who was captive at Ravana's palace, was rescued by Hanuman. As a token of thanks, Shani offered reprieve to all devotees of Hanuman. An alternative take is that once, Shani was caught between Hanuman's shoulders and the ceiling when attempting to mount the latter to influence his stars. Unable to bear the pain, Shani offered his gratitude in return for an immediate release.

The Dharmic faith suggests that its recital brings harmony to the household. Many Hindus believe that if one does not have time to read the whole Ramayana, one should read the Sundara Kanda.

== Other versions ==
Multiple variations of the Sundara Kanda exist in other languages as well, for instance in Awadhi, the language in which the saint Tulsidas wrote the Ramacharitamanasa. The Ramacharitamanasa was written much later than Valmiki's Ramayana, in the 16th century. This text extends beyond the Valmiki's Sundara Kanda, as it also includes events of Rama's army journey from the Kishkinda mountain to the seashore of Rameswaram; Rama prays to Shiva; Vibhishana, the sage Shuka and the deity of the oceans, Varuna, take refuge under Rama, and Varuna advises Rama to seek assistance from the two vanara brothers named Nala and Nila, who had the boon of being excellent architects and build a bridge from Rameswaram to Lanka (called the Rama Setu).

An earlier Tamil version, Ramavataram, by Kambar, is also a prevalent text among the Sri Vaishnava and Smarta Brahmins in South India.

Ranganatha Ramayanam, a Telugu version of Valmiki Ramayana written by Gona Budha Reddy, also describes this episode.

M. S. Ramarao wrote a Telugu version for Hanuman Chalisa of Tulsidas and Sundara Kanda of Valmiki Ramayana as 'Sundarakandamu' in Telugu during 1972–74. He sang Sundarakanda in the form of Telugu songs.

A Malayalam independent translation of Sundara Kandam can be found in 'Adhyatma Ramayanam Kilipattu', written by Thunchaththu Ramanujan Ezhuthachan. Ezhuthachan wrote the translation of the Adhyatma Ramayana, a Sanskrit text connected with the Ramanandi sect.

The Hanuman Chalisa is a different poetic contribution towards the heroics of Hanuman by Tulsidas. Though it mentions his achievements during Ramayana, it goes beyond that as well, encompassing the complete life of Hanuman.
