= Camille Bulcke =

Belgian-Indian Jesuit missionary (1909–1982)

Father Camille Bulcke
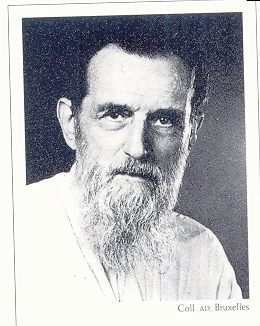
- Father Camille Bulcke
- Born: Camille; 1 September 1909; Knokke-Heist, West Flanders, Belgium
- Died: 18 August 1982 (aged 72); Delhi, India
- Citizenship: Belgium (former); India
- Years active: 1909–1982
- Known for: Hindi literature research, Tulsidas research
- Notable work: Ramkatha: Utpatti Aur Vikas (1949)
- Awards: Padma Bhushan

Camille Bulcke (1 September 1909 – 17 August 1982) was a Belgian Jesuit missionary in India who came to be known as "India's most renowned Christian Hindi scholar".

== Early life ==
Camille Bulcke was born in Ramskapelle, a village in Knokke-Heist municipality in the Belgian province of West Flanders

Bulcke had already acquired a BSc degree in civil engineering from Louvain University, when he became a Jesuit in 1930. After doing his philosophical training in Valkenburg, Netherlands, (1932–34) he left for India in 1934 and after a brief stay in Darjeeling, he taught Mathematics for five years at Gumla (present Jharkhand). It was here that he developed his lifelong passion for learning Hindi, as later recalled:

When I arrived in India in 1935, I was surprised and pained when I realised that many educated people were unaware of their cultural traditions and considered it a matter of pride to speak in English. I resolved my duty would be to master the language of the people." – The Faith of A Christian—Devotion To Hindi And To Tulsi.

He undertook theological training (1939–42) in Kurseong, India, during which he was ordained priest (in 1941). His interest in the classical language of India led him to do a master's degree in Sanskrit at Calcutta University (1942–44) and finally a doctorate in Hindi literature at Allahabad University (1945–49) with a thesis titled, Ram Katha Ka Vikas (Development of the Tale of Rama).

== Career ==
In 1949, Bulcke became the Head of the department of Sanskrit and Hindi of St Xavier's College, Ranchi. But early hearing problems led him to go more for a scholar's than a professor's career. He felt much attracted by the 17th century's Hindi poet Tulsidas on whose writings he made his doctoral thesis. He rewrote the famous Blue Bird play in Hindi under the name Neel Panchhi. Bulcke was often invited to give conferences on Tulsidas and his devotional Rama-songs, which he did with much enthusiasm. He brought people in touch with the profound values of their own spiritual traditions, and, according to him, Tulsidas was also an excellent introduction to the values of the Gospel. He obtained Indian citizenship in 1951, and – highly esteemed by the Government of India – was made a member of the National commission for the promotion of Hindi as the national language. He came to Bihar and visited the church of Darbhanga, praising "the great land of divines and Mata Sita - the Mithila", and hence, he took on the name Bihari after acquiring Indian citizenship.

He died in Delhi on 17 August 1982 due to gangrene.

== Camille Bulcke and Ramcharitmanas ==
To fulfil the duties of a missionary monk, Bulcke stayed for quite some time in Darjeeling to make an in-depth study of the scriptures, being deeply interested in philosophy, but to acquire a systematic knowledge of Indian philosophy and literature, he studied for his M.A. degree in Hindi from the University of Allahabad.

During this period of preparation for his M.A. in Allahabad, he had an occasion to read and study the Ramcharitmanas of Tulsidas. The Ramcharitmanas was a highly influential devotional book for Hindus in the 19th and early 20th centuries, and was frequently read by Europeans learning Hindi. The more Bulcke studied the Ramcharitmanas, the deeper became his attachment to it. His sublime sense of righteous goodness, the lofty values and ideals of its characters and its poetic excellence fascinated him to such an extent that it almost became an object of worship for him. He found a striking resemblance between the ethical aspect of righteous conduct and values of life as portrayed by the author of the Ramcharitmanas and those propounded by Jesus Christ in his discourses. He, therefore, took up a relevant topic, viz. Ramkatha: Utpatti Aur Vikas (The Tale of Rama: Origin and Development) and obtained his D.Phil degree from the University of Allahabad on the subject. His thesis was hailed by scholars all over India and his name came to be known even outside the Hindi world.

== Religious output ==
His lifelong involvement in Hindi research and translation work led him to gather material for an English-Hindi Dictionary (40,000 words) that is still the most widely used in North India. Till the end of his life he kept updating it. He prepared a life of Christ based on the four gospels, Muktidata (The Redeemer) and also translated the Bible into Hindi, as well as liturgical and devotional books. His love for the Hindi language, his imposing appearance as well as his constant willingness to help students and scholars and to listen to the simple and the distressed gave him the reputation of being a 'guru' and, for this reason, many approached him for advice even in matters that had little to do with literature.

== Main publications ==
- (Hindi) Muktidata (The Redeemer), Ranchi, 1942.
- The Theism of Nyaya Vaisheshika, Calcutta, 1947.
- (Hindi) Ramkatha: Utpatti Aur Vikas (The Tale of Rama: Origin and Development), Allahabad, 1950.
- (Hindi) Ramkatha Aur Tulsidas, (The Tale of Rama and Tulsidas) Allahabad, 1977.
- (Hindi) Naya Vidhan (New Testament), Ranchi, 1977.
- English-Hindi Dictionary, Ranchi, 1981 (3d ed.).

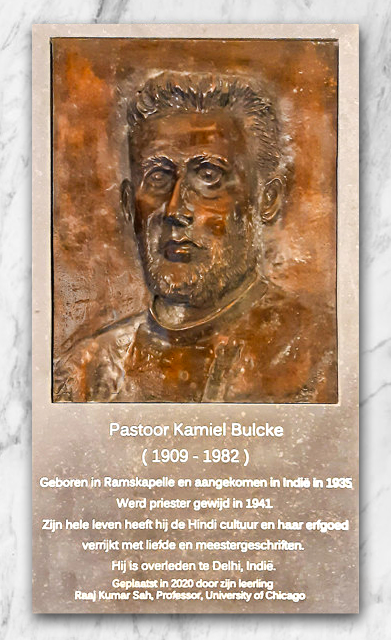
Plaque honoring Father Bulcke at his birthplace. Gifted by Raaj Sah.

== Recognition ==
In 1974, the Government of India conferred on him the Padma Bhushan, one of the premier civilian awards, second only to the Bharat Ratna and the Padma Vibhushan. The award was presented in recognition of his work in the field of literature and education.

Among those whom Bulcke mentored was Raaj Sah (subsequently Professor at the University of Chicago), beginning when Sah was an undergraduate at St. Xavier's College Ranchi. In gratitude, Sah gifted a plaque which was unveiled in 2020 at Bulcke's birthplace, Ramskapelle. The plaque's inscription is in Flemish, to honor that Bulcke's first love in languages was his mother tongue.

A word-picture (शब्द-चित्र) of Bulcke that Sah drew, in a style dear to Bulcke, is:

घोर बीदेस से मुनि एक आवा । सीया राम का तत्व पढ़ावा ।।
तुलसी देहरी तुलसी आँगन । बैठ वहां प्रभु पान करावा ।।
