= Vibhishana =

Character in the Hindu epic Ramayana

- King of Lanka
- Member of Chiranjivi
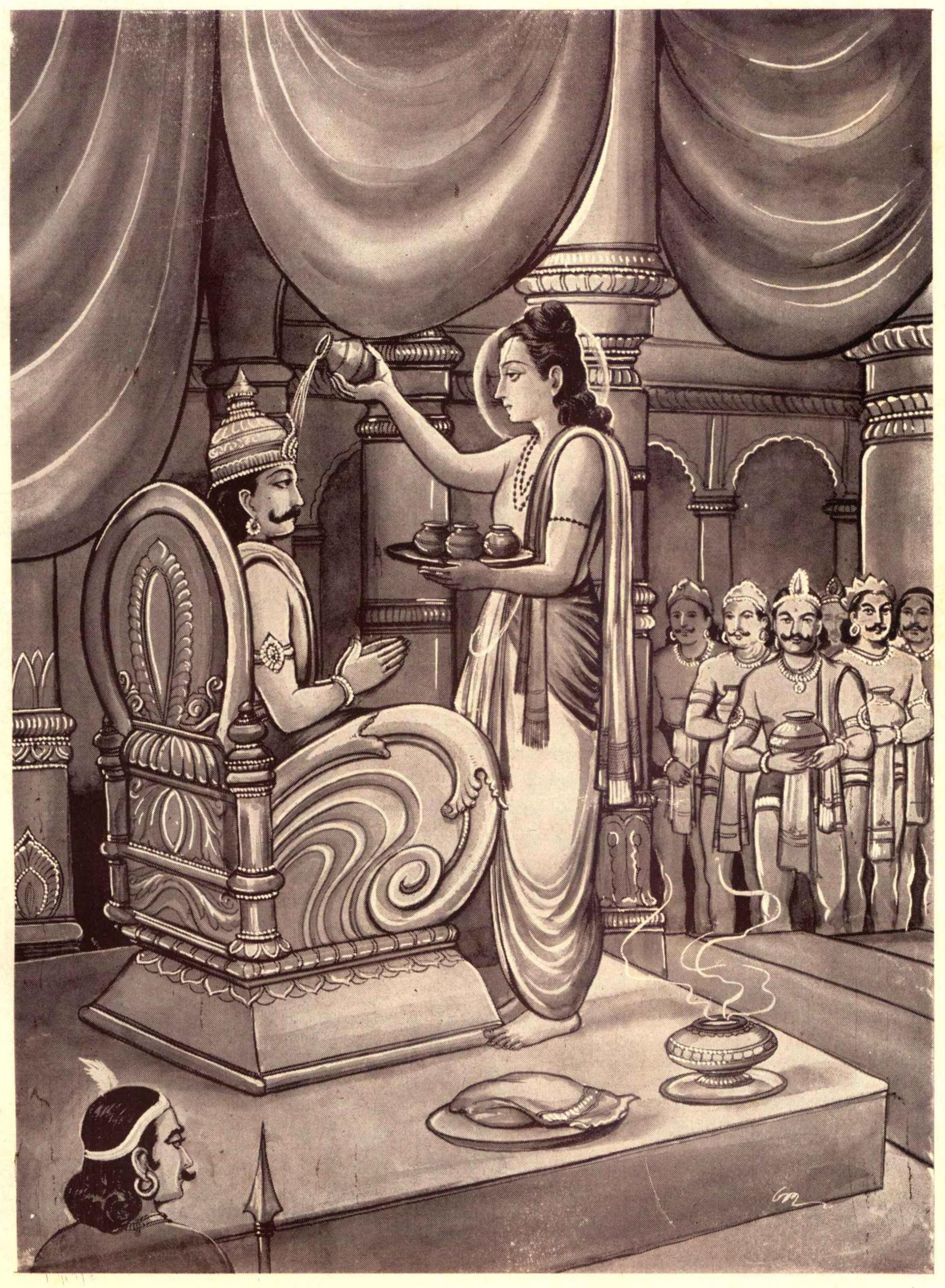
- Lakshmana crowns Vibhishana as King of Lanka
- Affiliation: Rakshasa, Vaishnavism
- Predecessor: Ravana
- Abode: Lanka
- Texts: Ramayana and its versions

Genealogy
- Parents: Vishrava (father); Kaikasi (mother)
- Siblings: Ravana; Kumbhakarna; Shurpanakha
- Consort: Sarama
- Children: Taranisena, Nila (sons), Sananda, Trijata and Analte(daughters) by Sarama
- Dynasty: Rakshasa

Vibhishana (Sanskrit: विभीषण, romanized: Vibhīṣaṇa, lit. 'formidable') is the younger brother of Ravana, the King of Lanka, in the ancient Indian epic Ramayana, and one of the eight Chiranjivis. Though a rakshasa himself, Vibhishana turned his back on Ravana, and defected to Rama's side, owing to his dharma. After Rama defeated Ravana, he became the king of Lanka.

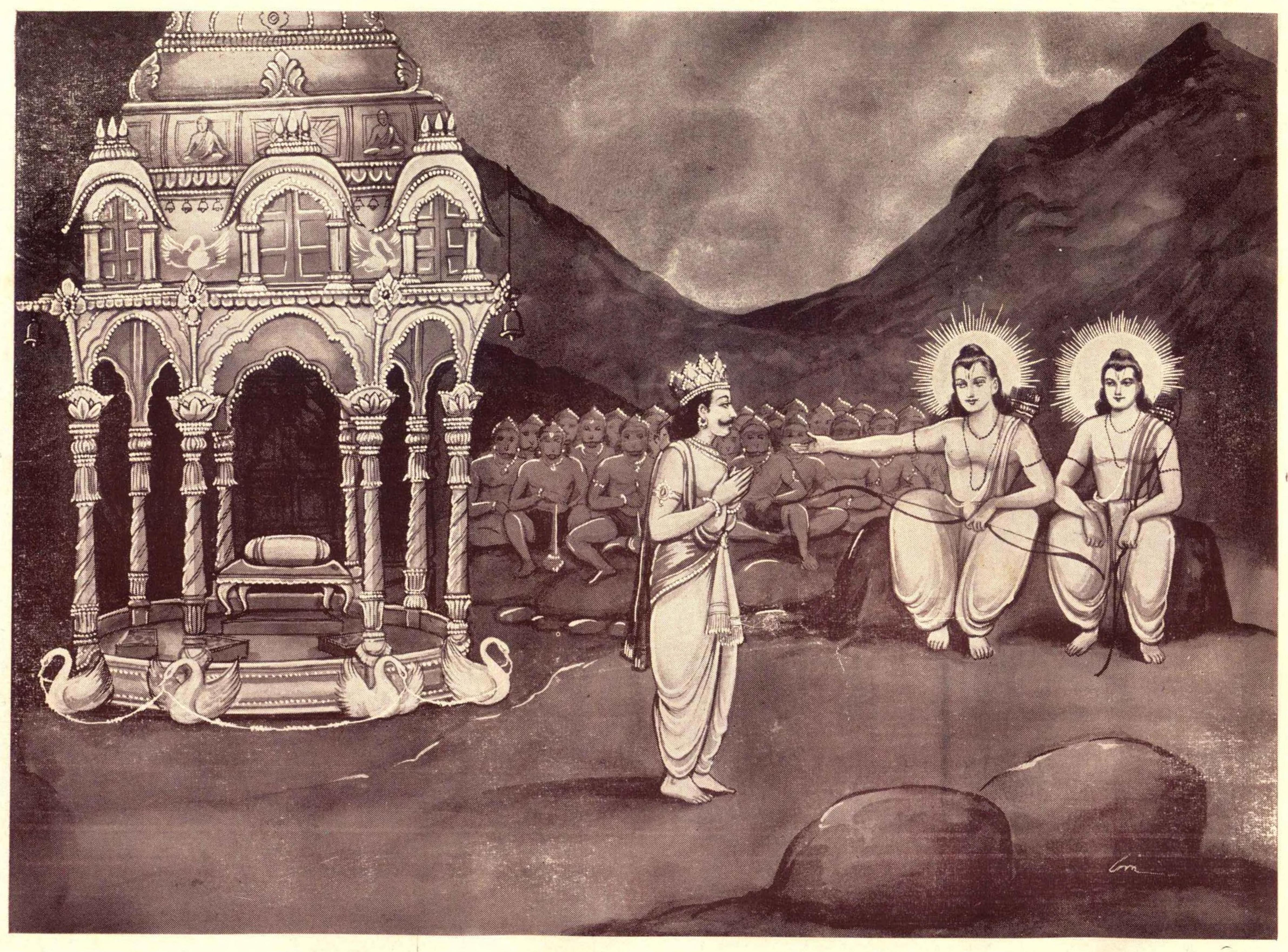
Vibhishana (left) shows the Pushpaka Vimana to Rama and Lakshmana

== Legend ==
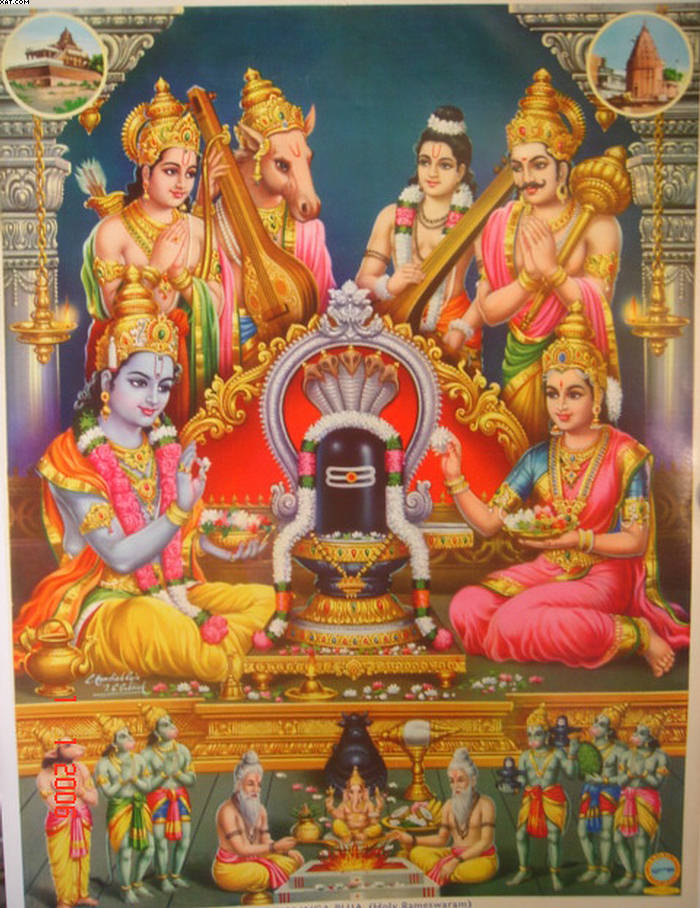
Rama and Sita worship Shiva at Rameshwaram as Vibhishana (right) looks on with Lakshmana, Tumburu and Narada

=== Early life and boon from Brahma ===
Prince Vibhishana is portrayed as a pious and pure of heart in the epic. After performing a penance to invoke a boon from Brahma, he asked the deity to always set his mind on the path to righteousness, and nothing more. Pleased by his righteousness Brahma gave the boon of immortality.

Vibhishana was the youngest son of the rakshasi Kaikesi and the sage Vishrava, who was himself a son of the sage Pulastya, one of the Prajapati. Vibhishana was the younger brother of the King of Lanka, Ravana, and also the sibling of Kumbhakarna. Even though he was born as a rakshasa, he was pious and virtuous, upholding the values of dharma.

=== Rama's devotee and Lanka war ===
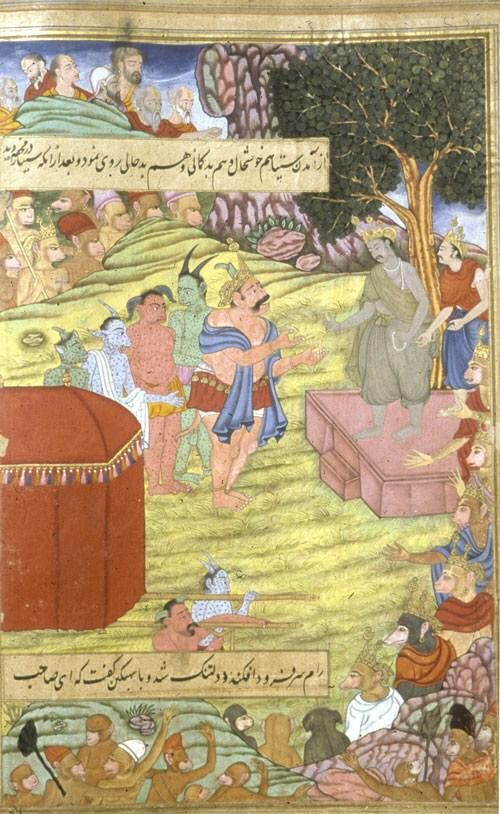
Vibhishana clarifies Rama about the enemy troops

Due to Vibhishana's differences with Ravana, and because he was against the act of kidnapping Sita, he fled Lanka. His mother, Kaikasi, advised him to go and serve Rama, who was at that time assembling an army to defeat Ravana and to recover his wife. As a consequence, he divulged the secrets of Ravana's army and made sure Rama was victorious in the great battle. Rama accepted Vibhishana's fealty and anointed him the King of Lanka after Ravana's death. In some versions of the epic, he takes his slain brother's queen Mandodari as his second wife, though in others he merely seeks her blessings during his coronation.

In the Lanka War, Vibhishana's knowledge about the secrets of Lanka proved invaluable to Rama. Vibhishana freely divulged many secrets that became key to the success of Rama's attack, including revealing the secret path to the temple of Nikumbala, the family deity of the Pulastya clan. In the climactic battle between Rama and Ravana, when Rama was unable to kill Ravana, he revealed the secret of Ravana's invulnerability to Rama. He told Rama that Ravana has stored the nectar of immortality in his belly and it is necessary to dry it. With this knowledge, Rama was finally able to kill Ravana. He had a daughter named Trijata.

=== Chiranjivi ===
When Rama was about to leave Ayodhya at the end of his reign, he assumed his true form of Vishnu, ordering Vibhishana to stay on earth and serve the people and guide them to the path of truth and dharma. Hence, Vibhishana is considered one of the immortals, the Chiranjivis. Vishnu also ordered Vibhishana to pray to the family deity of Solar dynasty, Ranganatha.

== Characterisation ==
In the Ramayana, Vibhishana's characterisation assists in demonstrating the practical implications of the concept of dharma. The epic stresses that neither Vibhishana nor Kumbhakarna strayed from the path of dharma and that there is no single way out of a moral dilemma. The Ramayana teaches that Kumbhakarna adhered to the dharma of loyalty to his kin when his advice fails, while Vibhishana chose to oppose his kin when his advice failed.

== Regional legends ==
=== Srirangam ===
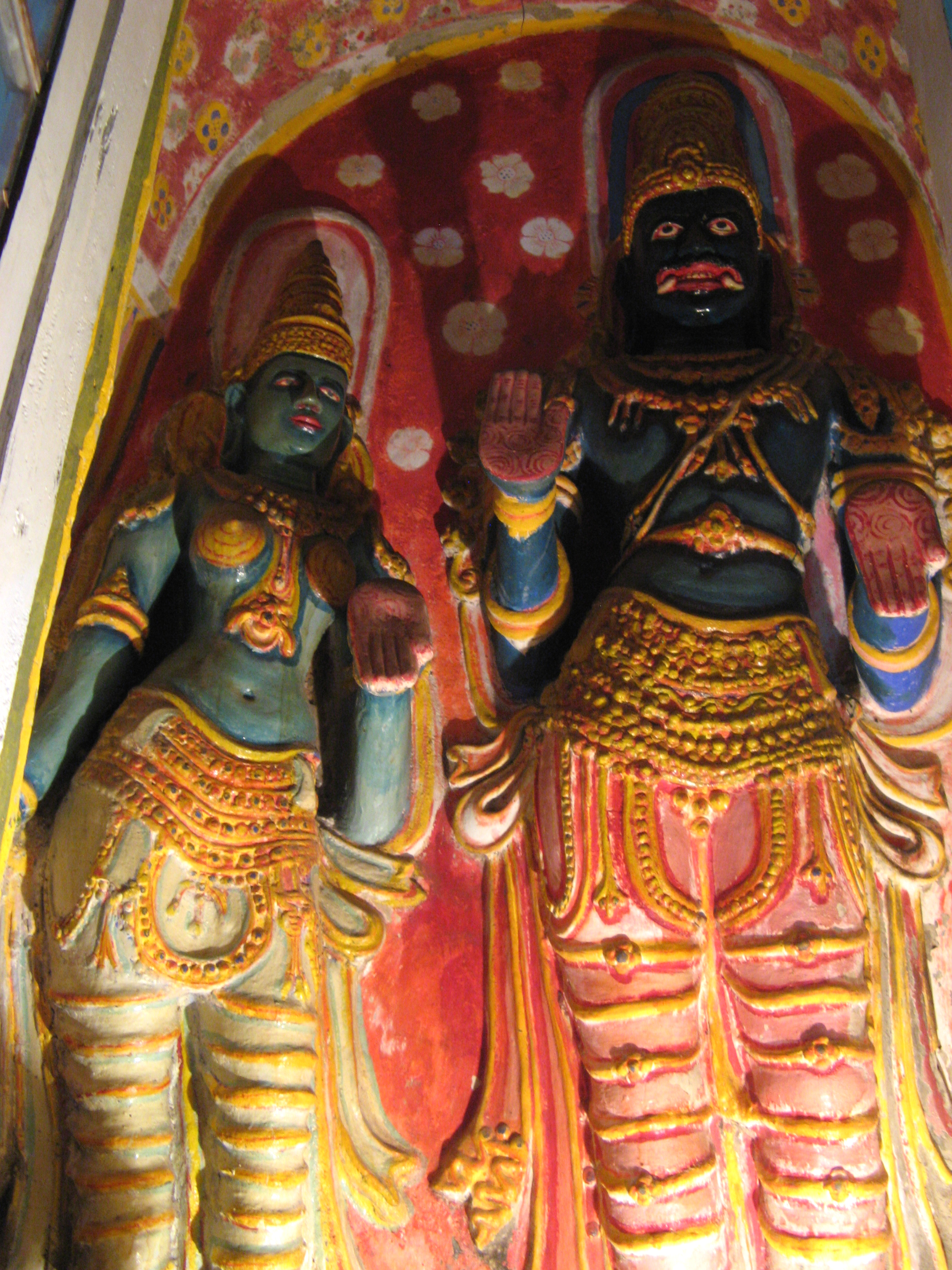
The statue in Lankatilaka Vihara of Vibhishana and wife is Sarama as in position of guardian deity of Sri Lanka

Vibhishana is featured in the Pancharatra, and consequently the regional legend of Ranganathaswamy temple of Srirangam, considered the foremost of the Divya Desams, the abodes of Vishnu in Sri Vaishnavism. During the coronation of Rama, the avatar of Vishnu, Vibhishana was presented the sacrosanct Sri Ranga vimana. He decided to carry it to his kingdom of Lanka. Midway his journey, in order to rest, he placed the image on the banks of the Kaveri. After performing his routine puja, he tried to lift the vimana, but it could not be lifted. Vishnu appeared to him and said that he desired to stay as Ranganatha in the place, which went on to become Srirangam. Vishnu also desired to watch the brahmotsavam at Tirucherai. The festivals of the temple are thus considered sacred.

=== Sri Lanka ===
In some period of history Sinhalese people have considered Vibhishana as one of the Sathara Waram Deviyo (four guardian deities). This belief was more prominent in the Kotte period. According to the Ravana Katha of Wickramasinghe Adigar, after the defeat of Ravana, Vibhishana transferred the Yaksha capital from Alaka mandawa to Kelaniya. In the 15th-century poem of Thotagamuwe Sri Rahula Thera, the sælalihini sandesaya, Myna is ordered to carry the missive to Vibhishana at his temple in Kelaniya. After the 16th century, he was replaced as a God of the four warrants by the goddess Pattini. He continues to be worshipped by a diminishing number of adherents, mainly in the Kelaniya area.

== Literature ==
The Sapta Chiranjivi Stotram is a mantra that is featured in Hindu literature:

अश्वत्थामा बलिर्व्यासो हनुमांश्च विभीषण:।
कृप: परशुरामश्च सप्तैतै चिरञ्जीविन:॥
सप्तैतान् संस्मरेन्नित्यं मार्कण्डेयमथाष्टमम्।
जीवेद्वर्षशतं सोपि सर्वव्याधिविवर्जितः॥ aśvatthāmā balirvyāsō hanumāṁśca vibhīṣaṇaḥ।
kṛpaḥ paraśurāmaśca saptaitai cirañjīvinaḥ॥
saptaitān saṁsmarēnnityaṁ mārkaṇḍēyamathāṣṭamam।
jīvēdvarṣaśataṁ sopi sarvavyādhivivarjitaḥ॥

— Sapta Chiranjivi Stotram

The mantra states that the remembrance of the eight immortals (Ashvatthama, Mahabali, Vyasa, Hanuman, Vibhishana, Kripa, Parashurama, and Markandeya) offers one freedom from ailments and longevity.
