= Ananda Ramayana =

15th century Sanskrit text

The Ananda Ramayana is one of the several derivative texts of the ancient Hindu epic Ramayana. The text has received little attention from scholars, though in some traditions, it is considered a principal source of Rama stories. It consists of 12,000 Shloka.

Many of the original stories from the Valmiki Ramayana are included in the Ananda Ramayana (though often with minor variations). Its primary significance, however, is its inclusion of original stories that are intended to provide background information for the Valmiki Ramayana narrative.

== Authorship ==
Traditionally the authorship of Ananda Ramayana is attributed to Maharshi Valmiki and has been orated across the Indian subcontinent by renowned devotees.

== Structure ==
According to various traditions, Ananda Ramayana has either nine or ten Kandas (cantos). As per standard version, the overall structure is as under.

- Saara Kanda :- Background with summary of entire text
- Yatra Kanda :- Description of various travels and journeys by main characters
- Yajna Kanda :- Details of sacrifices and rituals for worship
- Vilaasa Kanda :- Divine plays and pastimes of Rama and Sita
- Janma Kanda :- Chronicle of birth and lineage of Lord Rama and his brothers
- Vivaha Kanda :- Details of marriage ceremony and nuptial rites of Rama and his brothers
- Rajya Kanda :- Rama's governance and administration in Ayodhya
- Manohara Kanda :- Stories and legends exemplifying Rama's grace and attributes
- Poorna Kanda :- Devotional songs glorifying Rama's divine qualities

== Notable contents ==
=== Ravana's abduction of Kausalya, Rama's mother ===
The opening canto or Saara Kanda describes Ravana as once approaching Brahma to inquire how his own death would come about. Brahma responded that the son of Kausalya and Dasharatha would be the cause of his death. Enraged, Ravana immediately abducted Kausalya prior to her wedding, and placed her in a box on a deserted island in the middle of the ocean.

The sage Narada described Kaushalya's whereabouts to Dasharatha, who sent his army by boats to rescue her from the island. Upon hearing about Dasharatha's rescue attempt, Ravana despatched his rakshasa (demon) army. In the ensuing battle, Dasharatha's army was annihilated, but Dasharatha escaped on a wooden plank. After floating on the ocean for many days, Dasharatha landed on the island of Kausalya's captivity and chanced upon the box in which she was enclosed. Narada and other sages quickly arrived and performed a wedding ceremony, after which Dasharatha and Kausalya were enclosed in the box.

Unaware of these events, Ravana went to Brahma and boasted that Brahma's prediction had been rendered false, as Dasaratha had been killed and Kausalya was held captive. Knowing that his words must always be true, Brahma had the box brought to his and Ravana's presence. Seeing Dasharatha and Kausalya in the box, Ravana was humiliated and planned to kill them both, but his wife Mandodari persuaded him otherwise. Dasharatha and Kausalya went to Ayodhya happily as a married couple, whereas Ravana returned to Gokarna to perform intense tapas, thereby earning boons from Brahma that made him invincible to everyone except humans and monkeys. Later Lord Vishnu incarnated as Dasaratha and Kaushalya's son Rama in order to defeat Ravana with the help of Vaanar Sena (monkey army), thereby fulfilling Brahma's prophecy.

This story is not mentioned in either Valmiki Ramayana or any other Ramayana except for Ananda Ramayana.

=== The Consecration of the Shivalinga at Rameshwara ===
Rama sent Hanuman to bring a linga from Kashi (modern-day Varanasi), the city of Shiva. Hanuman was delayed, however, but because the muhurta (auspicious time for an event) was about to pass, Rama formed a linga made of sand and consecrated it instead. Hanuman returned and was disappointed to see that Rama had gone ahead with the consecration. Rama informed him, however, that if he removed the sand linga, he would consecrate the one Hanuman brought from Kashi. But Hanuman's efforts were to no avail, and recognizing his own pride he worshiped Rama and his pride dissipated. Rama then consecrated Hanuman's linga so that both would remain.

== Hymns to Rama and others ==
The Ananda Ramayana is a rich source of hymns for Rama and others, which include the following:

The Yaga Kanda includes the Ramashatanamastotra (the 108 names of Rama);

The Vilasa Kanda contains the Ramastotram, attributed to Shiva;

The Janma Kanda contains the Ramaraksha Mahamantra (the “Great Mantra for Gaining Protection from Rama”);

The Rajya Kanda contains the Ramasahasranamastotra (“Thousand Names of Rama”);

The Hanuman Kavacha, Rama Kavacha, and Sita Kavacha are found in the Manohar Kanda;

The Manohar Kanda also contains the Lakshman Kavacha, Bharata Kavacha, and Shatrughna Kavacha;

Also included is the Ramashtakastotram.
