= Siradhwaja Janaka =

Father of Goddess Sita

- Rajarshi
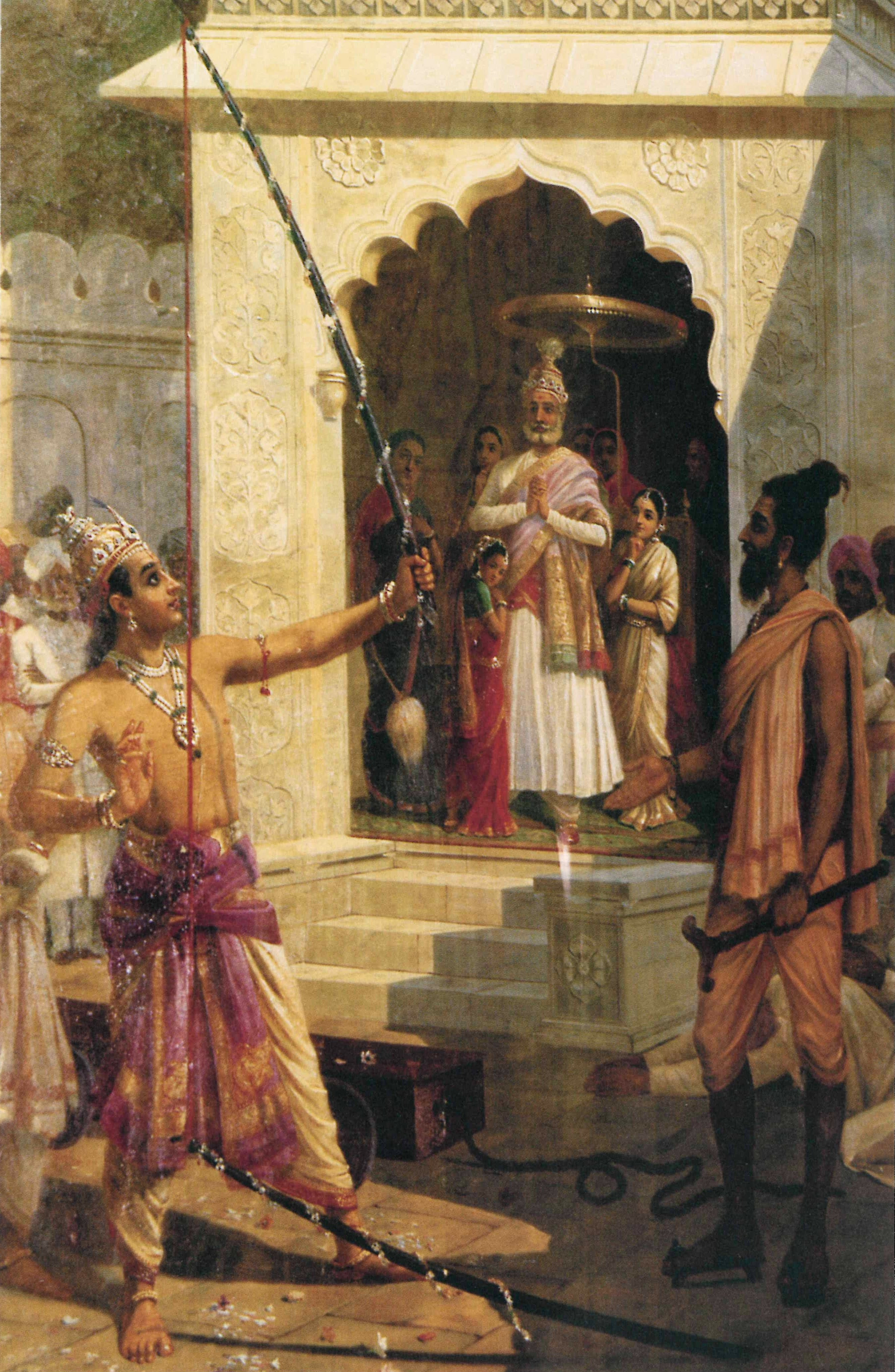
- Portrait of the King Siradhwaja Janaka by Ravi Varma.
- Predecessor: Hrasvaroman Janaka
- Born: Siradhwaja; Mithila
- Spouse: Sunayana
- Issue: Sita; Urmila; Bhanumaan Janaka (some documents mention him as the son of Siradhwaja Janaka)
Names
- Rajarshi Siradhwaja Janaka
Regnal name
- Videha Raj Janaka
- Country: Videha
- Country: Mithila
- Dynasty: Janaka
- Father: Hrasvaroman Janaka
- Mother: Keikasi
- Religion: Hinduism
- Occupation: Philosopher ruler king
- State's Commander-in-chief — Kushadhvaja

Siradhwaja Janaka (Sanskrit: सीरध्वज जनक) refers to the father of Goddess Sita and father in law of Lord Rama in the epic Ramayana. He was the king of the ancient Mithila Kingdom in the Indian subcontinent. He was the most popular Janaka in the Janaka Dynasty of Videha. He is sometimes also written as Shreedhwaja Janaka or Shiradhvaja Janaka or Śīradhvaja Janaka or Sīradhvaja Janaka.

== Etymology ==
Siradhwaja is a Sanskrit compound word consisting two Indic terms Sīra and Dhvaja. The first term Sīra means "plough" and the second term Dhvaja means flag or banner. Thus the literal meaning of Siradhwaja is plough bannered or flag consisting symbol of plough.

== Description ==
As asserted in the Balakanda of the text Ramayana, Siradhwaja was the 21st Janaka in the lineage of the King Nimi and Mithi. It is said that 54 kings in this lineage ruled the Mithila Kingdom, of whom 20 reigned before Siradhwaja Janaka and 33 after him.

After the victory of Lord Rama in the Sita Svayamvara at the court of Janaka in Mithila, Siradhwaja Janaka tied his familial relationship with the King Dasharatha of the Kosala Kingdom. He tied the hand of princess Sita with the prince Rama of Ayodhya. Presently, the date of marriage between the two divine couples is celebrated as the Vivaha Panchami in Hinduism.

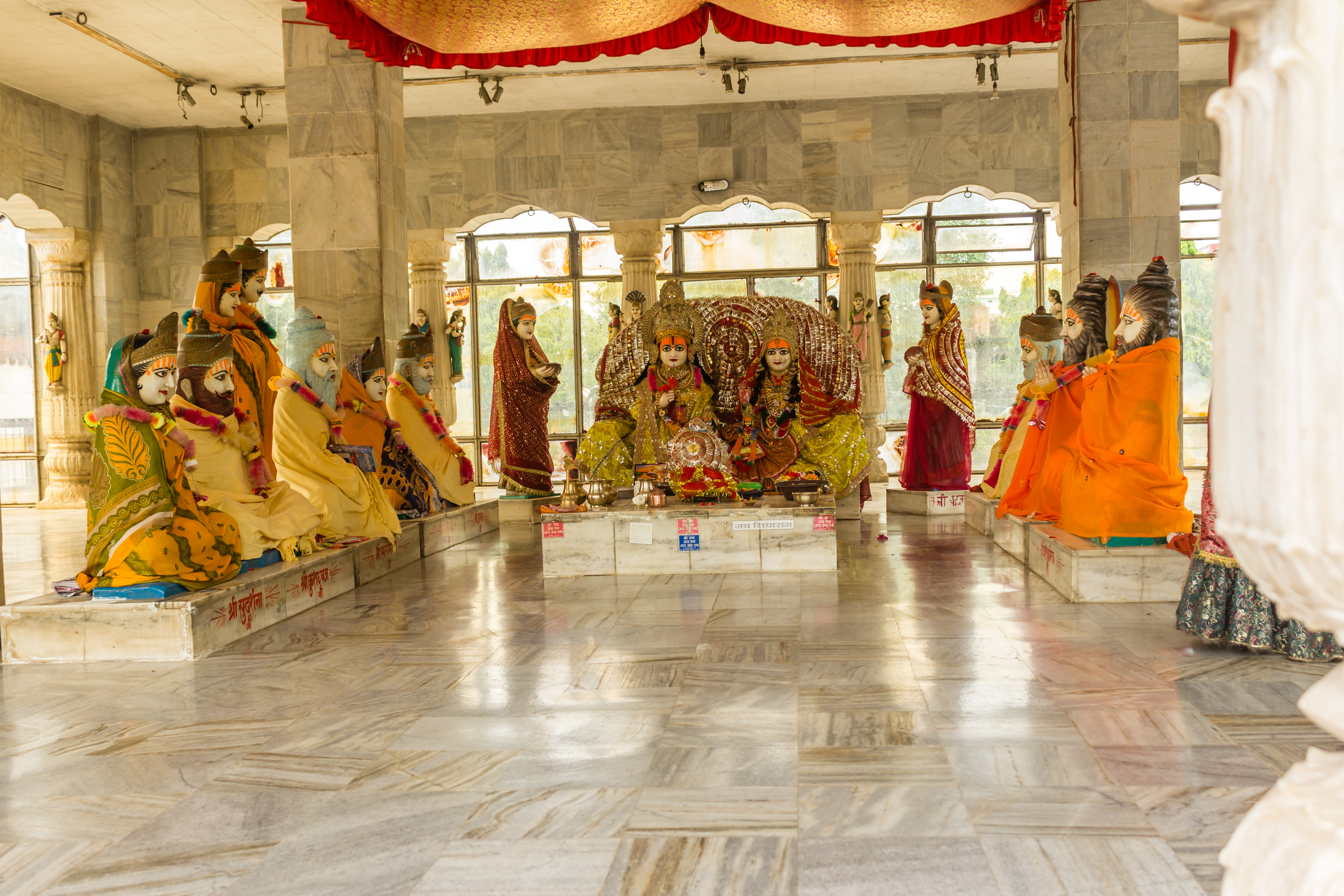
Depiction of the families of King Janaka and King Dasharatha at the Sita - Ram Vivah Mandap in the city of Janakpur in Mithila.

He was also well skilled in warfare. He encountered a war from the other powerful King Sudhanva of Samkashya around the time of Sita Svayamvara. The King Siradhwaja Janaka killed the opponent King Sudhanva in the war. After killing Sudhanva, the King Siradhwaja Janaka secured his position as a Samrat in the empire of Videha. He annexed the Kingdom of Samkashya into his empire and placed his brother Kushadhwaja as the ruler king of Samkashya.

== Early life ==
Siradhwaja was born in the royal dynasty of Janaka founded by the King Nimi and Mithi of Videha. He was the son of the King Hrasvaroman Janaka in Mithila. His mother was the queen Maharani Keikasi of the Mithila Kingdom.

== Later life ==
Siradhwaja was married to Sunayana. Later when his father King Hrasvaroman Janaka was retiring from the position of the kingship and was departing to forest, he hand overed the throne of Mithila to his eldest son Siradhwaja. After that Siradhwaja Janaka ascended the throne and became the king of the Mithila Kingdom. The King Siradhwaja Janaka was initially childless. Once in his kingdom a huge famine came. Due to this famine, the people and farmers of the kingdom faced drought and shortage of food and water. The King Siradhwaja Janaka consulted with his advisors regarding the way to get rid from the famine. Then, he was advised to plough a farm from himself, so that rain will come. It is said that when the King Siradhwaja Janaka was ploughing a farm, he encountered a box inside the farm. When the box was taken out from the farm an infant baby was found inside the box. The baby was named Sita and was adopted as the daughter of the King Siradhwaja Janaka.

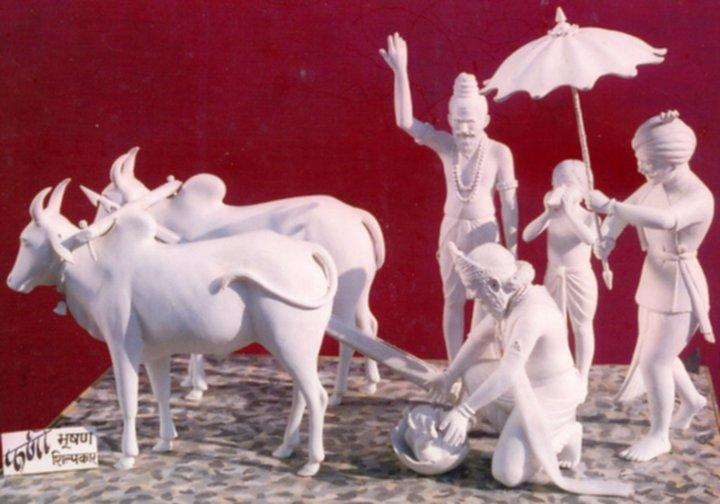
Image depicting the King Siradhwaja Janaka ploughing the farm and the manifestation of Sita from the Earth

== Patronage to Vedic learning ==
The King Siradhwaja Janaka was a great patron to the scholars of Vedic learning in Mithila. With his assistance, an ashram was established for the Vedic sage Maharshi Gautama in Mithila. The sage Gautama was appointed as the Kulpati of the ashram by the King Siradhwaja Janaka. The ashram was called Gautam Ashram and it served as an important educational institution in Mithila. Maharshi Gautama had a son called Shatananda, who also studied in the ashram and later became the royal priest cum advisor of the King Sirdhvaja Janaka in Mithila.

== Military system ==
In the Kingdom of Mithila, there was a unique military system. In the text Ramayana, Maharshi Valmiki describes that the King Janaka believed that the military only instilled fear in the people. If the state was nurturing and civilized, there was no need for an army in the city. The army troops of the kingdom were residing at the outskirts of the city. They were not permitted to practice in the city. In the regime of the King Siradhwaja Janaka, the state's commander-in-chief was Kushadhvaja. He was also living at the outskirts of the city with the army. He was given the responsibility of protection for the kingdom.
