= Ahalya =

Wife of the sage Gautama Maharishi in Hinduism

- Member of Panchakanya
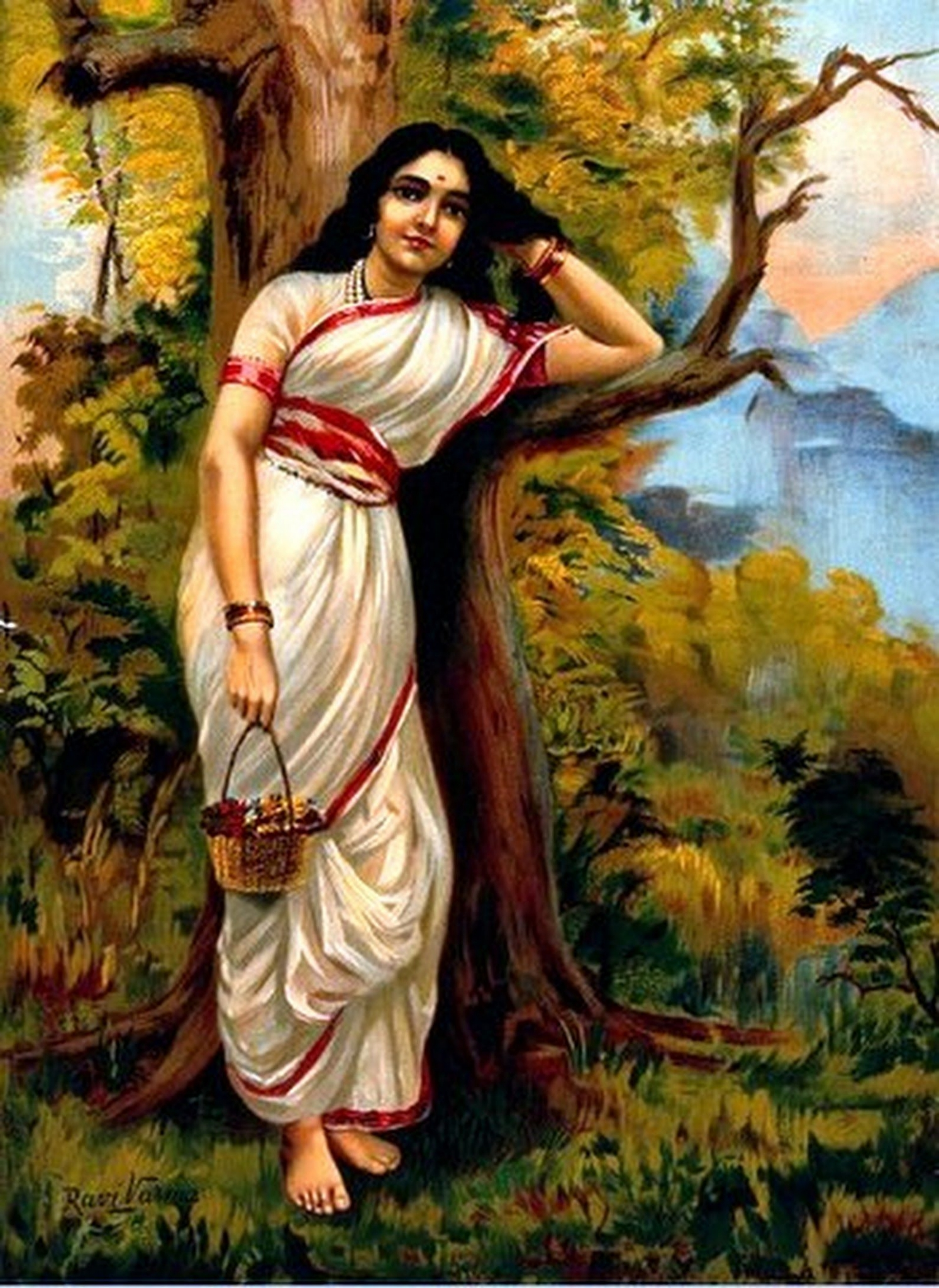
- Ahalya by Raja Ravi Varma (1848–1906)
- Devanagari: अहल्या
- Sanskrit transliteration: Ahalyā

Genealogy
- Parents: Brahma (creator)
- Consort: Gautama Maharishi
- Children: Shatananda (according to Ramayana)

In Hindu mythology, Ahalya (Sanskrit: अहल्या, IAST: Ahalyā) also spelt as Ahilya, is the wife of the sage Gautama Maharishi. Many Hindu scriptures describe her legend of seduction by the king of the gods Indra, her husband's curse for her infidelity, and her liberation from the curse by the god Rama.

Created by the god Brahma as the most beautiful woman, Ahalya was married to the much older Gautama. In the earliest full narrative, when Indra comes disguised as her husband, Ahalya sees through his disguise but nevertheless accepts his advances. Later sources often absolve her of all guilt, describing how she falls prey to Indra's trickery. In all narratives, Ahalya and Indra are cursed by Gautama. The curse varies from text to text, but almost all versions describe Rama as the eventual agent of her liberation and redemption. Although early texts describe how Ahalya must atone by undergoing severe penance while remaining invisible to the world and how she is purified by offering Rama hospitality, in the popular retelling developed over time, Ahalya is cursed to become a stone and regains her human form after she is brushed by Rama's foot.

Ahalya's seduction by Indra and its repercussions form the central narrative of her story in all scriptural sources for her legend. Although the Brahmanas (9th to 6th centuries BCE) are the earliest scriptures to hint at her relationship with Indra, the 5th- to 4th-century BCE Hindu epic Ramayana – whose protagonist is Rama – is the first to explicitly mention her extra-marital affair in detail. Medieval story-tellers often focus on Ahalya's deliverance by Rama, which is seen as proof of the saving grace of God. Her story has been retold numerous times in the scriptures and lives on in modern-age poetry and short stories, as well as in dance and drama. While ancient narratives are Rama-centric, contemporary ones focus on Ahalya, telling the story from her perspective. Other traditions focus on her children.

In traditional Hinduism, Ahalya is extolled as the first of the panchakanya ("five maidens"), archetypes of female chastity whose names are believed to dispel sin when recited. While some praise her loyalty to her husband and her undaunted acceptance of the curse and gender norms, others condemn her adultery.

== Etymology ==
The word Ahalya can be divided into two parts: a (a prefix indicating negation) and halya, which Sanskrit dictionaries define as being related to the plough, ploughing, or deformity. In the Uttara Kanda book of the Ramayana, the god Brahma explains the meaning of the Sanskrit word Ahalya as "one without the reprehension of ugliness", or "one with an impeccable beauty" while telling Indra how he created Ahalya by taking the special beauty of all creation and expressing it in every part of her body. Because some Sanskrit dictionaries translate Ahalya as "unploughed," some recent authors view this as an implicit reference to sexual intercourse and argue that the name refers to a virgin or a motherly figure. This fits the context of the character Ahalya, who is viewed as being in one way or another beyond Indra's reach. However, Nobel laureate Rabindranath Tagore (1861–1941), focusing on the literal meaning of "unploughed," interpreted Ahalya as a symbol of stone-like, infertile land that was made cultivable by Rama. Delhi University professor Bharati Jhaveri concurs with Tagore, interpreting Ahalya as unploughed land, on the basis of the tribal Bhil Ramayana of Gujarat, an undated oral tradition.

== Creation and marriage ==
Ahalya is often described as an ayonijasambhava, one not born of a woman. The Bala Kanda of the Ramayana (5th to 4th century BCE) mentions that Brahma moulds her "with great effort out of pure creative energy". The Brahma Purana (401–1300 CE) and the Vishnudharmottara Purana (401–500 CE) also record her creation by Brahma. According to the Mahari dance tradition, Brahma created Ahalya out of water as the most beautiful woman in order to break the pride of Urvashi, the foremost apsara. The tribal Bhil Ramayana begins with the tale of Ahalya, Gautama and Indra. In the tale, Ahalya is created from the ashes of the sacrificial fire by the Saptarishi (seven seers) and gifted to Gautama. In contrast, the Bhagavata Purana (501–1000 CE) and the Harivamsa (1–300 CE) regard Ahalya as a princess of the Puru Dynasty, the daughter of King Mudgala and sister of King Divodasa.

In the Uttara Kanda book of the Ramayana (regarded by most scholars as a later addition to the epic), Brahma crafts Ahalya as the most beautiful woman and places her in the care of Gautama until she reaches puberty. When that time arrives, the sage returns Ahalya to Brahma, who, impressed by Gautama's sexual restraint and asceticism, bestows her upon him. Indra, who believes that the best women are meant for him, resents Ahalya's marriage to the forest-dwelling ascetic.

The Brahma Purana gives a similar account of Ahalya's birth and initial custody, recording that her marriage was determined through an open contest. Brahma declares that the first being to go around the three worlds (heaven, earth and the underworld) will win Ahalya. Indra uses his magical powers to complete the challenge, finally reaching Brahma and demanding the hand of Ahalya. However, the divine sage Narada tells Brahma that Gautama went around the three worlds before Indra. Narada explains that Gautama circumambulated the wish-bearing cow Surabhi while she gave birth, as part of his daily puja (ritual offering), making the cow equal to three worlds according to the Vedas. Brahma agrees and Ahalya marries Gautama, leaving Indra envious and infuriated. A similar, but shorter, version of Ahalya's early life appears in the Padma Purana (701–1200 CE).

In all versions of the tale, after marrying Gautama, Ahalya settles into his ashram (hermitage), which generally becomes the site of her epic curse. The Ramayana records that Gautama's ashram is in a forest (Mithila-upavana) near Mithila, where the couple practices asceticism together for several years. In other scriptures, the ashram is usually near the river bank. The Brahma Purana says that it is near the river Godavari and the Skanda Purana (701–1200 CE) places it near the river Narmada. The Padma Purana and the Brahma Vaivarta Purana (801–1100 CE) describe the ashram as near the holy city of Pushkar.

== Hints of a relationship with Indra ==
The Brahmanas (9th to 6th centuries BCE) are the oldest scriptures to mention a relationship between Ahalya and Indra in the "subrahmanya formula", a chant used by Vedic priests "at the beginning of a sacrifice to invite the main participants: Indra, the gods and the Brahmins" (priests). The Jaiminiya Brahmana and the Sadvimsha Brahmana from the Samaveda tradition, the Shatapatha Brahmana and the Taittiriya Brahmana from the Yajurveda tradition and two Shrautasutras (Latyayana and Drahyayana) invoke Indra, the "lover of Ahalya ... O Kaushika [Brahmin], who calls himself Gautama". The Samaveda tradition identifies her as Maitreyi, who the commentator Sayana (died 1387) explains is "the daughter of [the god] Mitra".

In the subrahmanya formula, Ahalya does not have a husband. The Sadvimsha Brahmana does not explicitly state that Ahalya has a husband, although Kaushika (interpreted by most scholars as Ahalya's husband) is present in the story and his relationship to her can be inferred through Indra's adoption of the Brahmin's form to "visit" Ahalya. Renate Söhnen-Thieme, research associate at the School of Oriental and African Studies, feels that the Kaushika of the Sadvimsha Brahmana is the same individual described as cursing Indra in the 5th- to 4th-century BCE epic Mahabharata (discussed below in "Curse and redemption").

The Shatapatha Brahmana's commentator, Kumarila Bhatta (c. 700), reasons that the Ahalya–Indra narrative is an allegory for the Sun or the light (Indra) taking away the shade of night (Ahalya). Edward Washburn Hopkins, an American indologist, interpreted the Ahalya of the subrahmanya formula not as a woman, but literally as "yet unploughed land", which Indra makes fertile.

== Seduction by Indra ==
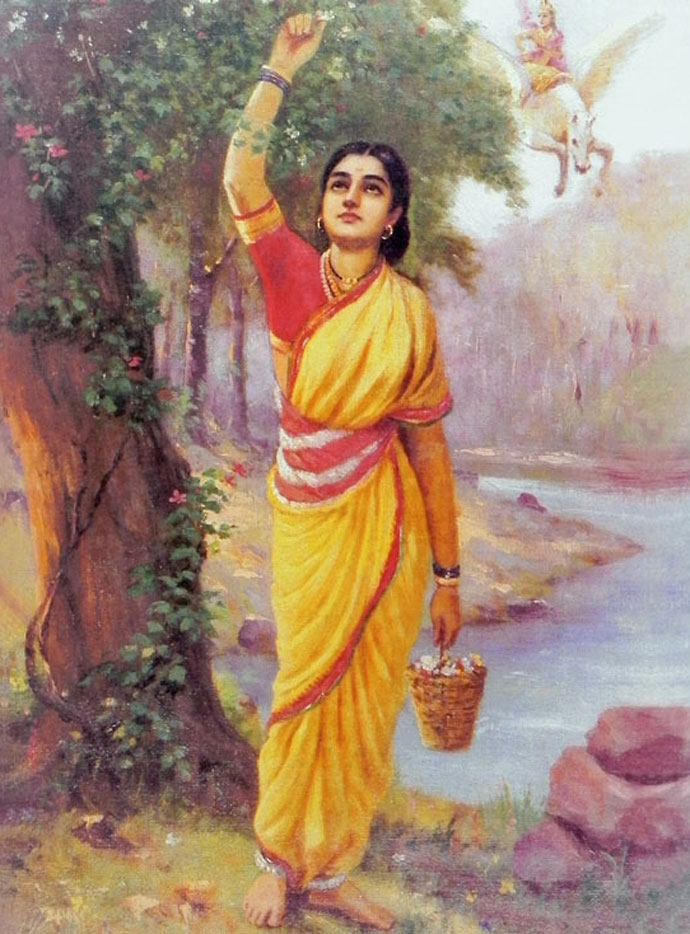
Raja Ravi Varma's Ahalya Indravalokan: Ahalya plucks flowers as Indra (top right corner), astride his flying horse, comes to visit her.

The Bala Kanda of the Ramayana is the earliest text to describe Ahalya's seduction in detail. It states that Indra becomes enamoured by Ahalya's beauty, learns of her husband's absence and comes to the ashram disguised as Gautama to request sexual intercourse with her, praising her as a shapely and slim-waisted woman. She sees through his disguise, but consents owing to her "curiosity". According to another interpretation, Ahalya's pride in her beauty compels her. Having satiated his lust, Ahalya requests that Indra, her "lover" and the "best of gods", flee and protect them from Gautama's wrath. The Kathasaritsagara (11th century CE) is one of the few texts that mirror the Bala Kanda's Ahalya, who makes a conscious decision to accept Indra's advances. However, in this text Indra arrives undisguised.

Although the Bala Kanda mentions that Ahalya consciously commits adultery, the Uttara Kanda of the Ramayana and the Puranas (compiled between the 4th and 16th centuries CE) absolve her of all guilt. The Uttara Kanda recasts the tale as Ahalya's rape by Indra. In one allusion in the Mahabharata, King Nahusha reminds Brihaspati, Indra's guru, how Indra "violated" the "renowned" rishi-patni (wife of a sage) Ahalya. According to Söhnen-Thieme, the usage of the words "violated" and "renowned" indicates that Ahalya is not considered an adulteress.

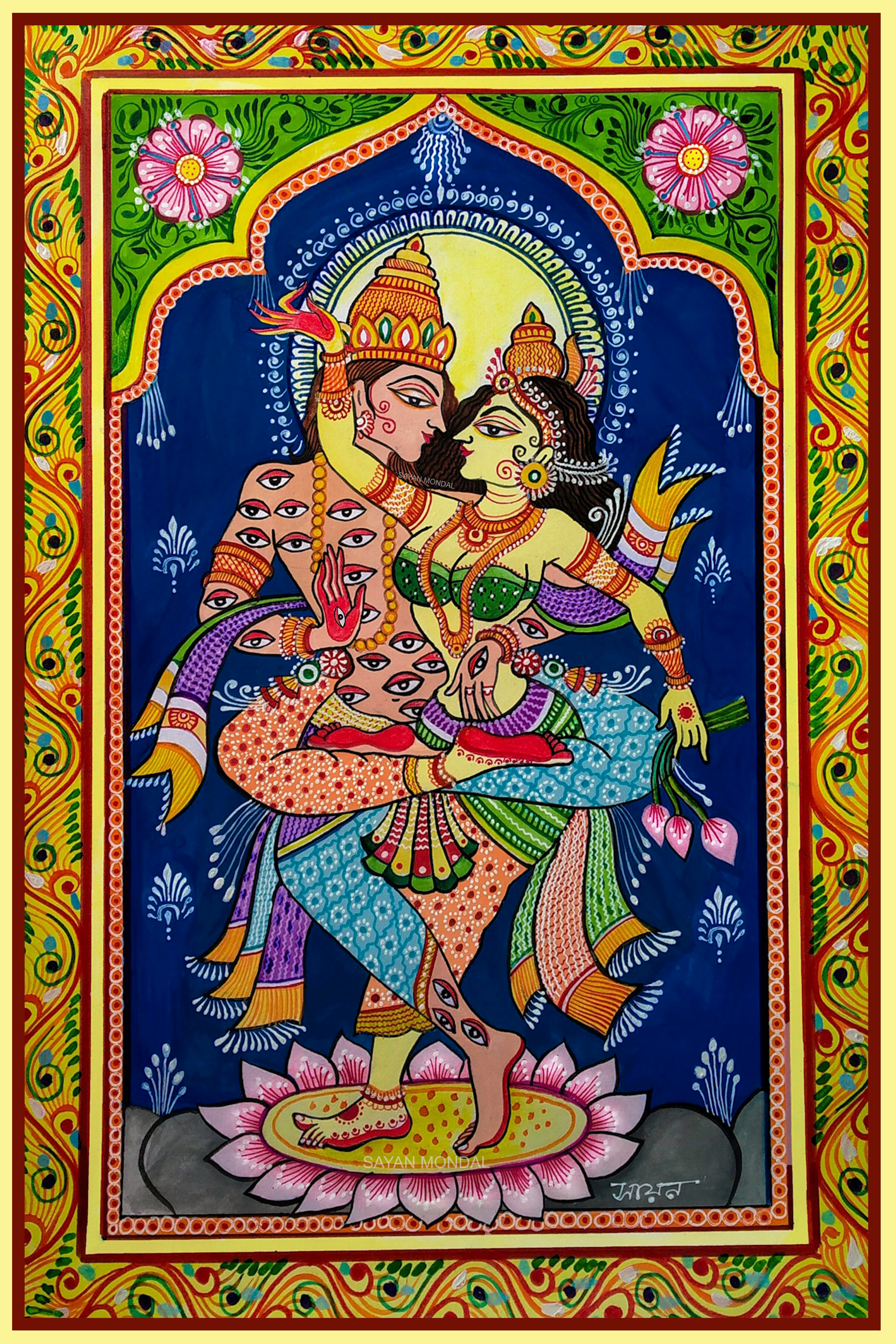
Indra with Ahalya, contemporary Pattachitra painting.

The Puranas introduce themes that are echoed in later works, including the deception of the unsuspecting Ahalya by Indra's devious disguise as Gautama in his absence. The Padma Purana states that after Gautama leaves for his ritual bath, Indra masquerades as Gautama and asks Ahalya to satisfy him. Ahalya, engrossed in worship, rejects him, considering it inappropriate to have sex at the cost of neglecting the gods. Indra reminds her that her first duty is to serve him. Finally Ahalya gives in, but Gautama learns of Indra's deception through his supernatural powers and returns to the ashram. A similar account is found in the Brahma Purana. At times, Indra takes the form of a cock that crows to dispatch Gautama for his morning ablutions, as in the 18th-century Telugu rendition of the tale by the warrior-poet Venkata Krishnappa Nayaka of the Madurai Nayak Dynasty. In other versions, he uses an accomplice, such as the moon-god Chandra, to distract Gautama. In the Brahma Vaivarta Purana, Ahalya comes to bathe in the Svarnadi (heavenly river) and Indra becomes infatuated with her when he sees her. Assuming Gautama's form, Indra has sex with her until they sink to the river bed in exhaustion. However, Gautama catches them in the act. Another version in the same Purana focuses on the question of how the chaste Ahalya was seduced by Indra. In this version, Indra approaches Ahalya on the banks of the Mandakini river in his own form to ask for a sexual favour, which is flatly refused by Ahalya. Indra subsequently poses as Gautama and fulfils his objective.

In some versions, though initially deluded by Indra's disguise, Ahalya eventually recognises the impersonator. In the Skanda Purana, Ahalya smells Indra's celestial fragrance and realises her folly as he embraces and kisses her and "so forth" (probably indicating a sexual act). Threatening Indra with a curse, she compels him to reveal his true form. However, Kamban's 12th-century Tamil adaptation of the Ramayana, the Ramavataram, narrates that Ahalya realises that her lover is an imposter but continues to enjoy the dalliance. Here, Ahalya agrees to have sex with the disguised Indra because she has long been craving affection from her ascetic husband.

In Venkata Krishnappa Nayaka's Telugu rendition, Ahalya is depicted as a romantic adulteress. When Brahma creates Ahalya as the most beautiful being, she falls in love with Indra and longs for him, but Brahma grants her to Gautama. After Ahalya's marriage, Indra too craves for her. He frequently visits her and flirts with her in Gautama's absence. At one point, Ahalya receives a visit from Indra's female messenger, who proceeds to mock husbands who avoid sex by saying that it is not the right day for pleasure. Ahalya protests, maintaining that she imagines Gautama to be Indra as they have sex and that a woman should be a stone, forgoing all thought of sexual gratification. That night, when Ahalya longs for conjugal bliss, Gautama refuses her, saying that she is not in her fertile period. Agitated, she wishes that Indra was there to satisfy her. Indra perceives her wish and comes in Gautama's disguise, but is revealed by his seductive speech. Ignoring the deception, Ahalya joyously makes love to him.

== Curse and redemption ==
While most versions agree that Gautama curses Ahalya after discovering the affair, the curse varies from text to text. However, almost all versions describe Rama as the agent of her liberation and redemption.

=== Punishments of Ahalya and Indra ===
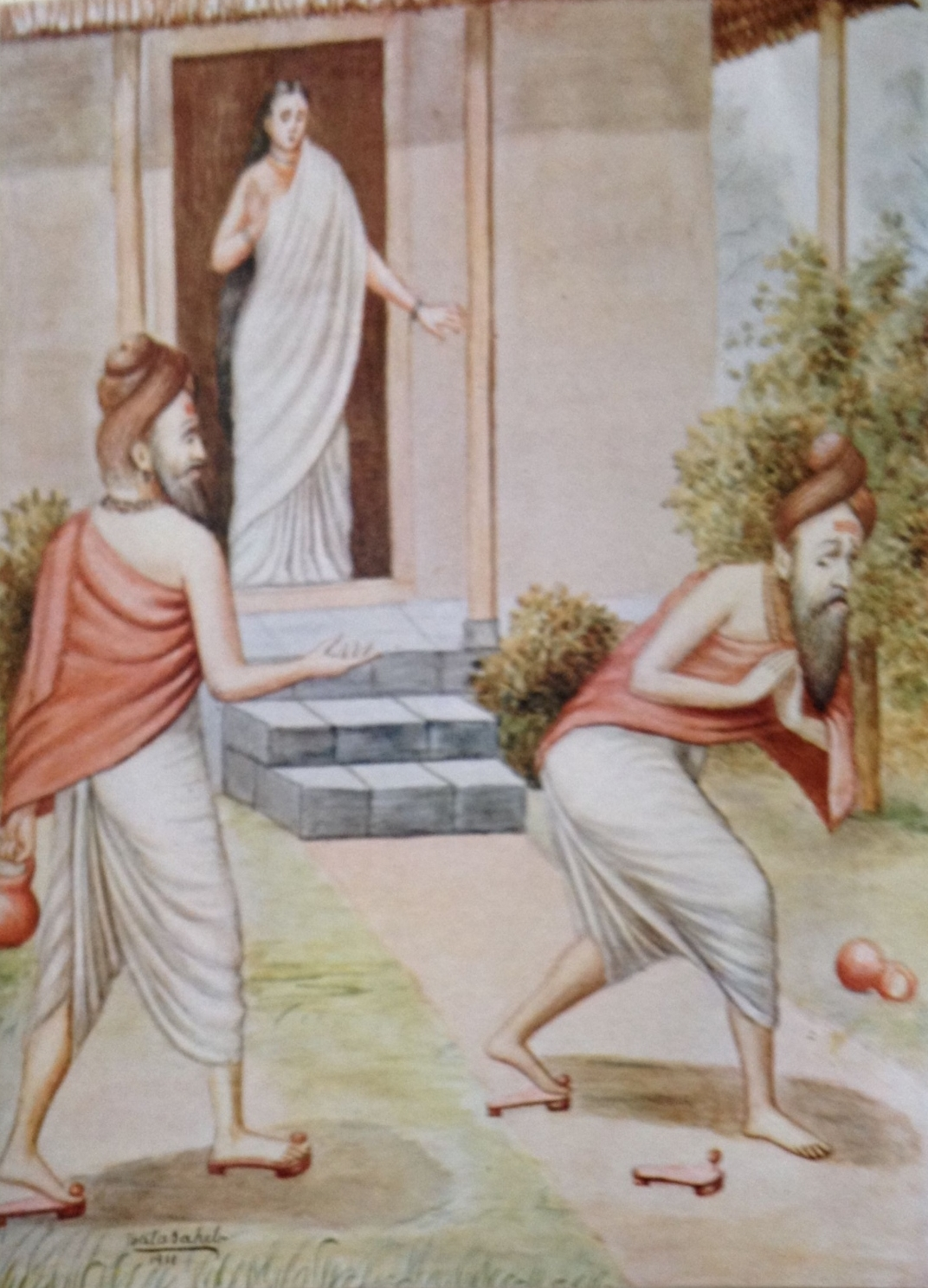
Gautama (left) discovers Indra disguised as Gautama fleeing, as Ahalya watches.

The Bala Kanda mentions that Gautama spots Indra, who is still in disguise, and curses him to lose his testicles. Gautama then curses Ahalya to remain invisible to all beings for thousands of years, fast by subsisting only on air, suffer and sleep in ashes and be tormented by guilt. Nevertheless, he assures her that her sin will be expiated once she extends her hospitality to Rama, who will visit the ashram. Thereafter, Gautama abandons the ashram and goes to the Himalayas to practise asceticism. The Ayodhya prince Rama, his brother Lakshmana and their guru, the sage Vishvamitra pass Gautama's desolate ashram while travelling to King Janaka's court in Mithila. As they near the ashram, Vishvamitra recounts the tale of Ahalya's curse and instructs Rama to save Ahalya. Although Ahalya is cursed, Vishvamitra nevertheless describes her as goddess-like and illustrious, repeatedly calling her mahabhaga, a Sanskrit compound (maha and bhaga) translated as "most illustrious and highly distinguished"; this interpretation contrasts with that of Rambhadracharya, who believes that the word mahabhaga, in the context of Ahalya's story, means "extremely unfortunate" (maha and abhaga). (Note: Rambhadracharya 2006, p. 36: "... महाभागां माने इसका सीधा सा उत्तर है, यदि आप कहें कि महाभागां माने महाभाग्यशालिनी, तो उसको तारने की क्या आवश्यकता है, तब क्यों तारा जाए। तो कहा महाभागां, अरे, वहाँ खण्ड करो – महा अभागां, ये बहुत दुर्भाग्यशालिनी महिला है – महत् अभागं यस्याः सा, जिसका बहुत बड़ा अभाग्य है ..." ("... mahābhāgāṃ means – it's a straightforward answer, if one says that mahābhāgāṃ means highly fortunate, then what is the need to liberate her, why should she be liberated? Then, it was said, mahābhāgāṃ – decompose it as mahā abhāgām, she is an extremely unfortunate lady – mahat abhāgaṃ yasyāḥ sā, whose misfortune is very extreme ...")) Following Vishvamitra, the princes enter the ashram to see Ahalya, who, up till then, had been hidden from the universe. Ahalya is described as glowing from the intensity of her ascetic devotion, but hidden from the world like the Sun obscured by dark clouds, the light of a full moon hidden by mist or a blazing flame masked by smoke. Under the direction of his guru, Rama considers Ahalya pure and unblemished and, accompanied by Lakshamana, gives her obeisance by touching her by his feet, an act that restores her social status. She greets them, recalling Gautama's words that Rama would be her redeemer. Ahalya extends her warmest reception, making a "welcome offering" of forest fruits and washing their feet, an act of respect according to the rites of that era. The gods and other celestial beings shower Rama and Ahalya with flowers and bow to Ahalya, who has been purified through her penance. Gautama then returns to his ashram and accepts her.

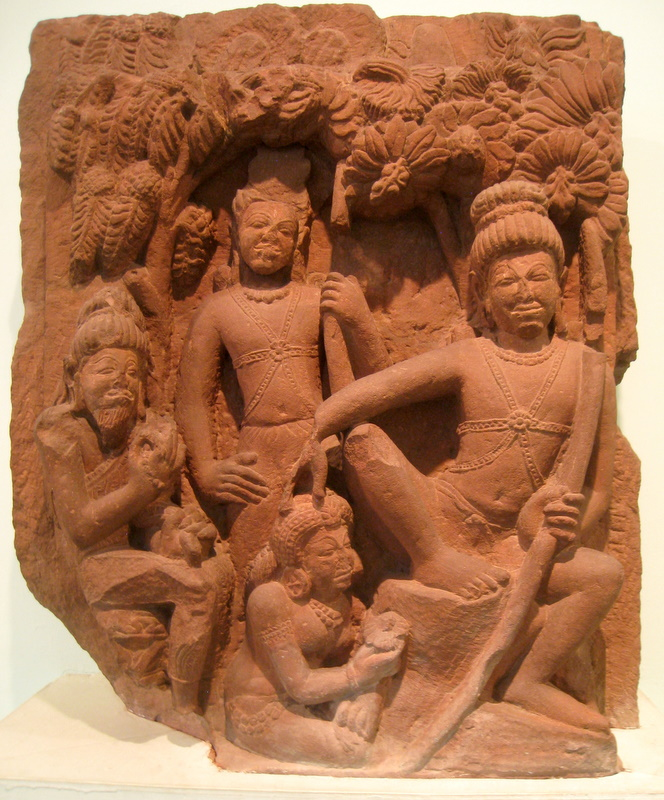
Ahalya offering fruits and flowers to Rama, her saviour, in a 5th-century CE stone sculpture from Deogah, currently in the National Museum, New Delhi

In one instance in the Mahabharata, Indra is said to have been cursed by having his beard turned to gold as he seduces Ahalya, while a curse by Kaushika (sometimes interpreted as synonymous to Gautama) is cited as the reason for his castration. In the Uttara Kanda, Indra is cursed to lose his throne and endure captivity and bear half the sin of every rape ever committed, (Note: The curse of the Uttara Kanda is fulfilled when Indrajit defeats Indra and conquers heaven.) while the innocent Ahalya is cursed to lose her status as the most beautiful woman, as it had prompted Indra's seduction. Ahalya claims her innocence (this part is not found in all manuscripts), but Gautama agrees to accept her only when she is sanctified by offering Rama hospitality.

Ahalya's defence plea is also found in some of the Puranas. In the Brahma Purana, Ahalya is cursed to become a dried up stream, but pleads her innocence and produces servants, who were also deceived by Indra's disguise, as witnesses. Gautama reduces the curse on his "faithful wife" and she is redeemed when she joins the Gautami (Godavari) river as a stream. Indra is cursed to carry his shame in the form of a thousand vulvae on his body, but the vulvae turn into eyes as he bathes in the Gautami. The Brahma Purana is a rare exception where Rama is dropped from the narrative. Instead, the greatness of the Gautami river is illustrated. The Padma Purana tells that as Indra attempts to flee in the form of a cat, Gautama curses him to lose his genitals and to bear a thousand vulvae on his body. The beguiled Ahalya declares herself blameless, but Gautama considers her impure and curses her to be reduced to a mere skeleton of skin and bones. He decrees that she will regain her beautiful form when Rama laughs at seeing her so afflicted, dried out (a reminder of the dried stream motif), without a body (the Ramayana curse) and lying on the path (an attribute often used to describe a stone). When Rama comes, he proclaims her innocence and Indra's guilt, whereupon Ahalya returns to her heavenly abode and dwells with Gautama.

=== Stone motifs ===
In the popular retelling of the legend in later works, as well as in theatre and electronic media, Ahalya is turned to stone by Gautama's curse and returns to her human form only after being brushed by Rama's foot. Pradip Bhattacharya, author of Panch-Kanya: The Five Virgins of Indian Epics, argues that this version of the tale is the result of a "male backlash" and patriarchal myth-making that condemns her as a non-entity devoid of emotions, self-respect and social status.

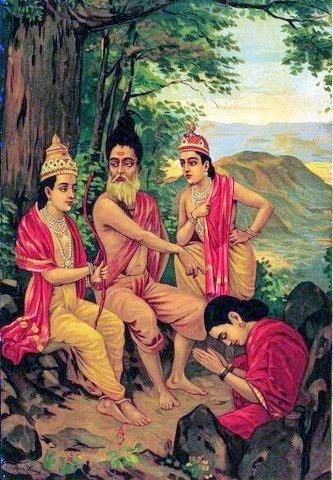
Ahalya emerges from her stone form, after being touched by Rama's foot. The motif of Ahalya being turned into stone first gets scriptural authority in the Puranas. (Early-20th-century print by Ravi Varma Press)

According to the Brahma Vaivarta Purana, Gautama curses Indra to bear a thousand vulvae, which will turn to eyes when he worships the sun-god Surya. Ahalya is turned to stone for sixty thousand years and destined to be redeemed only by Rama's touch. Ahalya accepts the verdict without debate. In another version in the same Purana, Gautama catches Indra fleeing as a cat and curses him with castration. Ahalya's plea of innocence is acknowledged by Gautama, who declares that her mind is pure and she has kept the "vow of chastity and fidelity", but another man's seed has defiled her body. Gautama orders her to go to the forest and become a stone until rescued by the touch of Rama's feet. In Venkata Krishnappa Nayaka's Telugu rendition, when Indra reluctantly leaves, Gautama arrives and curses Ahalya to become a stone, to be later purified by Rama's feet. After she is freed from the curse, Gautama and Ahalya are reconciled and they spend their days in bed, exploring sexual techniques.

The Skanda Purana tells that when Gautama arrives, Ahalya explains the whole tale truthfully, but is cursed by Gautama to become a stone, because he believes that she acted as a rolling stone, unable to recognise the difference between Indra's and Gautama's gestures and movements. The touch of Rama's feet is prophesied to be her saviour. The terrified Indra escapes as a cat and is cursed with castration. Ahalya's truthfulness is also observed in the Kathasaritsagara. When Gautama arrives after the act, Indra tries to flee as a cat but is cursed to bear the marks of a thousand vulvae. When asked by Gautama about her visitor, Ahalya wittily answers that it was a majjara, a word meaning either "cat" or, when split as ma-jara, "my lover". Gautama laughs and curses her to be turned into stone, but decrees that she will be released by Rama since she at least spoke the truth.

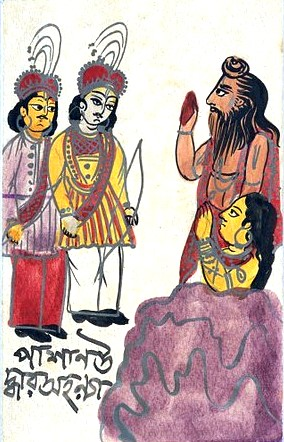
Rama liberates Ahalya from her stone form in this 19th-century Kalighat painting.

The petrification motif also appears in non-scriptural works. The Raghuvamsa of Kalidasa (generally dated 4th century CE) notes that the wife of Gautama (unnamed here) momentarily becomes the wife of Indra. Without explicitly mentioning the curse, it relates further that she regains her beautiful form and casts away her stony appearance, owing to the grace provided by the dust of Rama's feet, which redeems her. Gautam Patel, author of many works about Kalidasa, credits him as the first person to introduce the petrification motif. In the Ramavataram too, Rama does not have to touch Ahalya with his foot; the dust from his feet is enough to bring her back to life. As in other versions of the tale, the repentant Ahalya is turned to stone, only to be liberated by Rama, and Indra runs away disguised as a cat but is cursed to bear the marks of a thousand vulvae. The Ramavataram is an example of the Bhakti-era poets who exalt Rama as a saviour.

Although opinions differ on whether the Bala Kanda narrative of Ahalya refers to the divinity of Rama, later sources assert Rama's divine status, portraying Ahalya as a condemned woman rescued by God. (Note: Goldman 1990, p. 45: "The Bala Kanda episode in which Rama releases Ahalya ... in hands of Tulsi Das ... and other poets of the bhakti movement becomes the archetypal demonstration of the lord's saving grace – is in Valmiki handled with no reference to the divinity of the hero") (Note: Rambhadracharya 2006, pp. 35–36: The author states that the use of the word taaraya (IAST tāraya, "liberate") by Valmiki in verse 1.49.12 (spoken by Vishvamitra to Rama) of the Ahalya narrative implies the divinity of Rama, since it is only God that can liberate and not a common man.) The Bhakti-era poets use the episode as an archetypal example to demonstrate God's saving grace. The main theme of such narratives is her deliverance by Rama, which is seen as proof of his compassion.

Most of the fifth chapter of the Bala Kanda Book of the Adhyatma Ramayana (embedded in the Brahmanda Purana, c. 14th century) is dedicated to the Ahalya episode. Like most other versions of the story, Ahalya is turned into stone and advised to engross herself in meditation of Rama, "the Supreme Lord". When Rama touches the stone with his foot on Vishvamitra's advice, Ahalya rises as a beautiful maiden and sings a long panegyric dedicated to Rama. She describes his iconographic form and exalts him as an avatar of Vishnu and source of the universe to whom many divinities pay their respects. After worshipping him, she returns to Gautama. At the end of the narrative, Ahalya's hymn is prescribed as an ideal benediction for a devotee to gain Rama's favour. The Awadhi Ramacharitamanasa (16th century) drops the narrative of Indra's visit to Ahalya. In this epic, Vishvamitra tells Rama that the cursed Ahalya has assumed the form of a rock and is patiently awaiting the dust from Rama's feet. Ahalya tells Rama that Gautama was right to pronounce the curse, and she deems it as the greatest favour, for as a result, she feasted her eyes on Rama, who liberated her from her worldly existence. As in the Adhyatma Ramayana, Ahalya lauds Rama as the great Lord served by other divinities, asks for the boon of eternal engrossment in his devotion and afterwards leaves for her husband's abode. The narrative ends with praise for Rama's compassion. Tulsidas alludes to this episode numerous times in the Ramacharitamanasa while highlighting the significance of Rama's benevolence. Commenting on this narrative in the Ramacharitamanasa, Rambhadracharya says that Rama destroyed three things: the sin of Ahalya by his sight, the curse by the dust of his feet and the affliction by the touch of his feet, evidenced by the use of the Tribhangi (meaning "destroyer of the three") metre in the verses which form Ahalya's panegyric.

=== Other variants ===
In some rare exceptions, the curse is dropped. In an instance in the Mahabharata, where details of the seduction are absent, an agitated Gautama orders his son Chirakari to behead his "polluted" mother and leaves the ashram. However, Chirakari is hesitant to follow the order and later concludes that Ahalya is innocent. Gautama returns and repents his hasty decision, realising that Indra is the guilty party. In the Bhil Ramayana, Gautama attacks and imprisons Indra, who is freed when he promises to shower rain on the crops as the rain god. He must also ensure that one quarter of the crops is dedicated to Gautama. Here, Ahalya is interpreted as dry and burnt land, eager for the rains sent by Indra, who is tamed by the wild cyclonic Gautama.

== Modern renditions ==
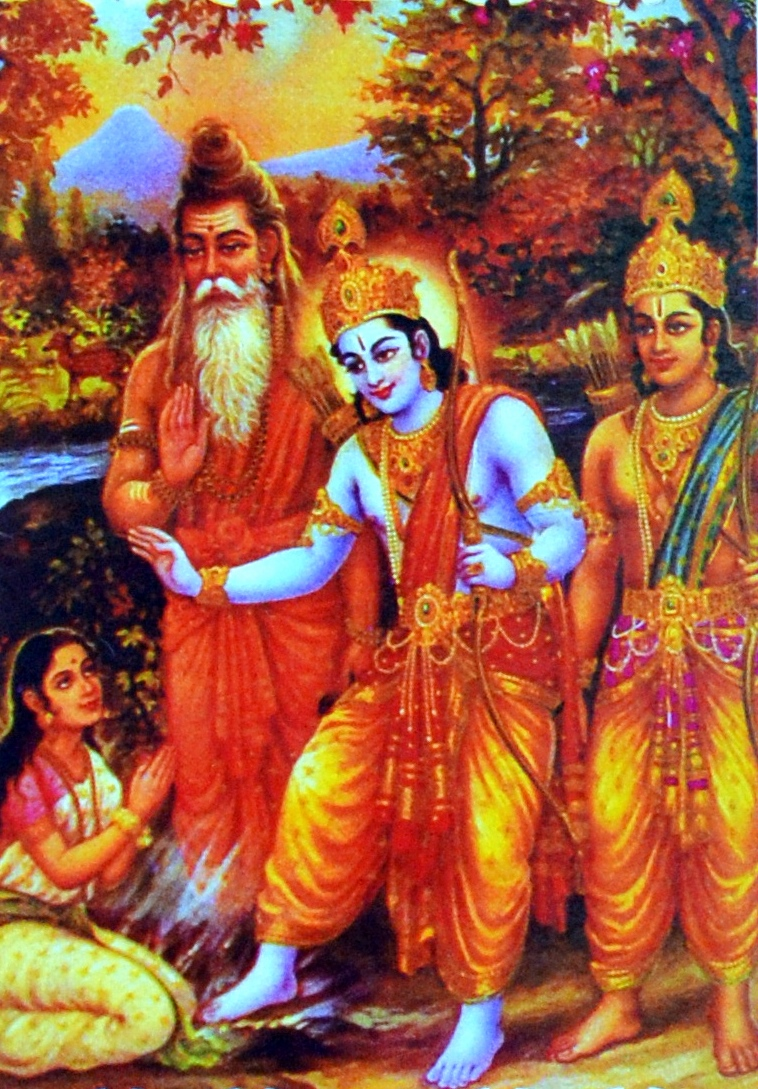
The redemption of Ahalya, as depicted on the cover of Ahalyoddhara (2006), a book by Rambhadracharya.

Ahalya has been examined in a new light by several modern writers, most commonly through short stories or through poetry in various Indian languages. Although Ahalya is a minor character in all ancient sources, "stigmatised and despised by those around her" for violating gender norms, modern Indian writers have elevated her to the status of an epic heroine, rather than an insignificant figure in the saga of Rama. However, in modern devotional Ramayana adaptations where Rama is the hero, the redemption of Ahalya continues to be a supernatural incident in his life. (Note: See examples: Rambhadracharya 2006.; Shastri 2005.; Ramanand Sagar 1987–1988.; NDTV Imagine 2008.)

Ahalya's tale lives on in modern-day poetry, including works by Rabindranath Tagore in Bengali and English; P. T. Narasimhachar's 1940 Kannada poetic drama, Ahalya, which weighs kama against dharma (pleasure against duty); and the works of the Sanskrit scholar and poet Chandra Rajan. It is retold numerous times in stage enactments as well as in film and television productions. Ahalya is a popular motif in the Mahari temple-dancer tradition of Odisha. Other works and genres of performance art that have been used to tell her story include the mohiniyattam dance of Kerala; Ahalyamoksham, a play by Kunchan Nambiar staged in the ottamthullal tradition; and Sati Ahalya, a padya-natakam drama from Andhra Pradesh.

Early in the 20th century, the old norms were reasserted. Pa. Subramania Mudaliar in his Tamil poem (1938) describes Ahalya lecturing Indra on chastity, but Indra's lust compels him to rape her. Gautama turns Ahalya to stone to free her from the trauma. The Tamil writer Yogiyar portrays an innocent Ahalya, who sleeps with the disguised Indra, overcome with guilt and asking for punishment. Sripada Krishnamurty Sastry's Telugu version of Ramayana (1947), one of the most censored versions of the tale, reduces Ahalya's contact with Indra to a handshake.

Other authors reinterpreted the Ahalya legend from a very different perspective, often depicting Ahalya as a rebel and telling the story from her angle. R. K. Narayan (1906–2001) focuses on the psychological details of the story, reusing the old tale of Indra's disguise as Gautama, his flight as a cat and Ahalya's petrifaction. The theme of adulterous love is explored in Vishram Bedekar's musical Marathi play Brahma Kumari (1933) and the Malayalam works of P. V. Ramavarier (1941) and M. Parvati Amma (1948). The Ahalya of the Tamil short story writer Ku Pa Rajagopalan (1902–44) also secretly longs for Indra and enjoys dalliance with him. Pratibha Ray's Odia novel Mahamoha (1997, "Great Lust") portrays an independent and nonconformist Ahalya as a tragic heroine, who offers herself to Indra so that he can fulfil his lust and she her womanhood. When Gautama persuades her to lie to society by claiming to have been raped, she debates chastity and freedom of mind with him.

Some writers try to imagine Ahalya's life after the curse and redemption, a denouement which remains undisclosed in the ancient scriptures. Pudhumaipithan's Tamil story Sapavimocanam (1943, "Deliverance from the Curse") and K. B. Sreedevi's Malayalam language work (1990) translated as "Woman of Stone" focus on Rama's "double standard" from a feminist perspective. They ask why Rama frees Ahalya from being cursed for adultery, but punishes his wife Sita over false accusations of adultery with her kidnapper, Ravana. (Note: Richman 2008, pp. 113–114: The translations of all these works are present in Richman 2008, pp. 141–173.) In Pudhumaipithan's tale, Ahalya turns back into stone after hearing that Sita had to undergo a trial by fire to prove her chastity. Sreedevi portrays her turning into stone upon learning that Sita was banished from the kingdom on charges of adultery even after proving her chastity through the trial. Pudhumaipithan also narrates how, after the redemption, Ahalya suffers from "post-trauma repetition syndrome", repeatedly re-experiencing Indra's seduction and Gautama's fury, as well as suffering the ire of a conservative society that rejects her. Gautama also suffers from self-recrimination at his hasty decision to curse Ahalya. In another story, Ahalya by Pudhumaipithan, Gautama forgives both Ahalya and Indra.

S. Sivasekaram's 1980 Tamil poem Ahalikai examines the stone motif in Ahalya's tale: she marries a husband who is no more interested in her than a stone and briefly encounters joy with Indra, only to end up cursed to become a lifeless stone. The poet asks if it was better for Ahalya to remain physically a stone and retain her dignity rather than return to a stony marriage. Uyir Maga ("Life-woman") by the Tamil poet Na. Pichamurthy (1900–76) presents Ahalya as an allegorical representation of life, with Gautama as the mind and Indra pleasure. The Marxist critic Kovai Gnani, in his poem Kallihai, represents Ahalya as the oppressed class and Rama as an ideal future without exploitation. Gautama and Indra represent feudalism and capitalism. The character of Ahalya played by Kamala Kotnis in the 1949 movie Sati Ahalya ("chaste Ahalya") was described as still relevant by contemporary film critics due to its portrayal of the predicament of a stained woman.

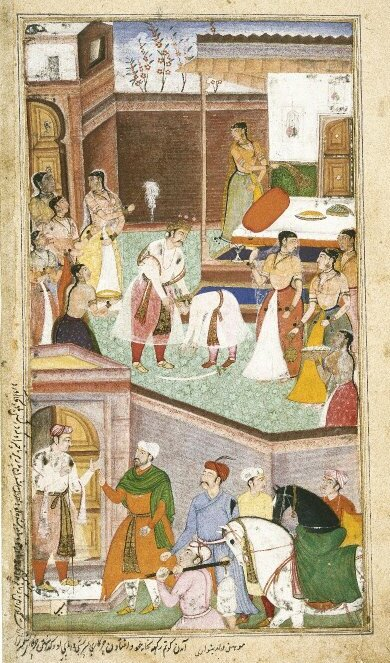
Gautama is relieved to find that his son Chirakari has not carried out his impulsive order to execute Ahalya. (Leaf from the Razm-Nama, a Persian translation of the Mahabharata initiated by the emperor Akbar in 1598–99. Currently in the Brooklyn Museum)

Love, sex and desire become important elements of the plot in Sant Singh Sekhon's Punjabi play Kalakar (1945), which places the epic drama in the modern age. It depicts Ahalya as a free-spirited woman, who dares to be painted nude by Inder (Indra), a pupil of the art professor, Gautama, and defends her decision against her husband's criticisms. (Note: See English translation in Gill 2005, pp. 251–304.) N. S. Madhavan's Malayalam story (April 2006) also retells Ahalya's tale in a modern setting, wherein Ahalya, accused of adultery, is beaten by her husband, leaving her in a coma from which the neurologist, Rama, revives her. However, the practice of retelling the classical Ahalya–Indra tale in a contemporary setting is not new. The Yoga Vasistha (1001–1400) narrates a tale of two adulterous lovers, Queen Ahalya and the Brahmin Indra. Here, Ahalya and Indra fall in love and continue their affair, despite being punished by Ahalya's jealous husband. After death, they reunite in their next birth. The 2015 short film Ahalya gives a feminist twist to the tale where the policeman Indra turns into a stone doll, after visiting Ahalya.

== Children ==
The Ramayana mentions Ahalya's son, Shatananda (Satananda), the family priest and preceptor of King Janaka of Mithila. In this version, Shatananda asks Vishvamitra anxiously about the well-being of his "renowned" mother. By contrast, the Mahabharata mentions two sons: Sharadvan, born with arrows in his hand, and Chirakari, whose extensive brooding over his actions leads to procrastination. Besides these, an unnamed daughter is also alluded to in the narrative. The Vamana Purana mentions three daughters: Jaya, Jayanti and Aparaji.

Another legend, generally told in Indian folk tales, states that Aruna, the charioteer of the sun-god Surya, once became a woman named Aruni and entered an assembly of celestial nymphs, where no man except Indra was allowed. Indra fell in love with Aruni and fathered a son named Vali. The next day, at Surya's request, Aruna again assumed female form, and Surya fathered a son, Sugriva. Both children were given to Ahalya for rearing, but Gautama cursed them, causing them to turn into monkeys, as he did not like them. In the Thai version of the Ramayana, the Ramakien, Vali and Sugriva are described as Ahalya's children from her liaisons with Indra and Surya. Although Ahalya initially passes them off as sons of Gautama, her daughter by Gautama – Anjani – reveals her mother's secret to her father. He consequently drives the brothers away and curses them to become monkeys. Enraged, Ahalya curses Anjani to give birth to a monkey too. Anjani bears Hanuman, the monkey-god and friend of Rama. Similar tales are also found in the Malay adaptation, Hikayat Seri Rama, and Punjabi and Gujarati folk tales. However, Anjani is cursed by Gautama in these versions, generally for aiding Indra and Ahalya in concealing the secret.

Some Tamil castes trace their ancestry to Ahalya and Indra's liaison; the castes are named after Ahalya's children. Gautama finds the three boys and names them according to their behaviour: Agamudayar (derived from "brave"), who confronts Gautama, Maravar (derived from "tree"), who climbs a tree and Kallar (derived from "thief" or "rock"), who hides like a thief behind a large rock. A fourth child, Vellala, is added in some versions. In another variant, the liaison is replaced by penance and worship offered by Ahalya to Indra, who gifts her the children as a reward.

== Assessment and remembrance ==
A well-known verse about Ahalya runs:

Sanskrit transliteration
ahalyā draupadī Kunti tārā mandodarī tathā ।
pañcakanyāḥ smarennityaṃ mahāpātakanāśinīḥ ॥

English translation
Ahalya, Draupadi, Kunti, Tara and Mandodari
One should forever remember the five virgins who are the destroyers of great sins

Note: A variant of this prayer replaces Sita with Kunti.

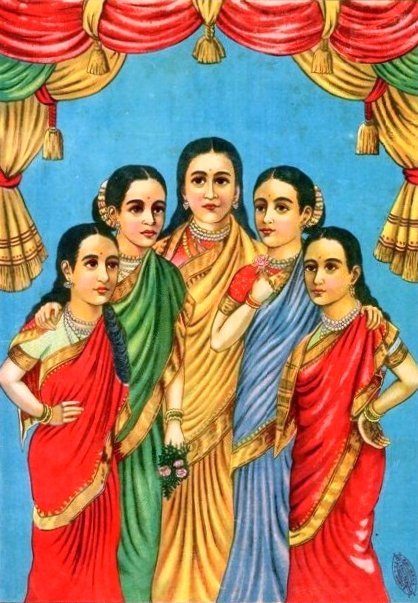
Panchakanya, a pre-1945 lithograph from Ravi Varma Press.

Orthodox Hindus, especially Hindu wives, remember the panchakanya, the five virgins or maidens, in this daily morning prayer. One view considers them "exemplary chaste women" or mahasatis ("great chaste women") as per the Mahari dance tradition, and worthy as an ideal for "displaying some outstanding quality". According to this view, Ahalya is the "epitome of the chaste wife, unjustly accused of adultery", while her "proverbial loyalty to her husband" makes her venerable. Ahalya is often regarded as the leader of the panchkanya due to the "nobility of her character, her extraordinary beauty and the fact of her being chronologically the first kanya". In the Devi-Bhagavata Purana, Ahalya is included in a list of secondary goddesses, who are "auspicious, glorious and much praiseworthy", alongside Tara and Mandodari as well as some of the pancha-satis ("five satis or chaste wives") Arundhati and Damayanti.

Another view does not regard the panchakanya as ideal women who should be emulated. Bhattacharya, author of Panch-Kanya: The Five Virgins of Indian Epics contrasts the panchakanya with the five satis enlisted in another traditional prayer: Sati, Sita, Savitri, Damayanti and Arundhati. He rhetorically asks, "Are then Ahalya, Draupadi, Kunti, Tara, and Mandodari not chaste wives because each has 'known' a man, or more than one, other than her husband?" Because they exhibited sexual behaviours that were non-ideal and even unethical according to traditional norms, Indian social reformer Kamaladevi Chattopadhyay was perplexed by the inclusion of Ahalya and Tara in the panchakanya. Although Ahalya's transgression blemished her and denied her the high status and reverence accorded to women like Sita and Savitri, this action made her immortal in legend.

The place where Ahalya is held to have practised her penance and was redeemed has been celebrated in scriptures as a sacred place called the Ahalya-tirtha. A tirtha is a sacred place with a body of water, where pilgrims generally bathe to purify themselves. The location of the Ahalya-tirtha is disputed: according to some scriptures, it is on the river Godavari, others place it on the river Narmada. Two sites are widely held to be the Ahalya-tirtha. One is located near Ahalyeshvara Temple in Bhalod, on the banks of the Narmada; another is located in Darbhanga district, Bihar. The Ahilya Asthan temple in Ahalya-gram ("Ahalya's village") in the same district is dedicated to Ahalya. For those seeking to attract women and be handsome like the love-god Kamadeva, the Matsya Purana and the Kurma Purana prescribe the worship of Ahalya at the Ahalya-tirtha. This is to be done on the day of Kamadeva, in the Hindu month of Chaitra. According to the texts, he who bathes in the tirtha will enjoy pleasure with the celestial nymphs.

For Bhattacharya, Ahalya is the eternal woman who responds to her inner urges and the advances of the divine ruler, a direct contrast to her ascetic husband, who did not satisfy her carnal desire. The author regards Ahalya as an independent woman who makes her own decisions, takes risks and is driven by curiosity to experiment with the extraordinary and then accept the curse imposed on her by patriarchal society. It is this undaunted acceptance of the curse that makes the Ramayana praise and venerate her. V. R. Devika, author of Ahalya: Scarlet Letter, asks, "So is it right to condemn adultery and physical encounters as modern afflictions and against our [Indian/Hindu] culture? Or do we learn from Ahalya who made a conscious choice to fulfil her need and yet has been extolled?"

Like Bhattacharya, Meena Kelkar, author of Subordination of Woman: a New Perspective, feels that Ahalya was made venerable due to her acceptance of gender norms; she ungrudgingly accepted the curse while acknowledging her need for punishment. However, Kelkar adds that another reason for making Ahalya immortal in scripture could be that her punishment acts as a warning and deterrent to women. Patriarchal society always condemns Ahalya as a fallen woman. In Bhavabhuti's 8th-century play Mahaviracharita, which alludes to Ahalya's redemption in a verbal spat with Parashurama, Satananda is mocked as the son of Ahalya, the adulteress. Jaya Srinivasan, in her discourses on tales from the Hindu epics, says that though Ahalya's action was "unpardonable", she was redeemed by the divine touch of dust from Rama's feet. Jaya adds that Ahalya's actions and the resultant curse are a warning that such immoral behaviour leads to doom, although sincere penitence and complete surrender to God can erase the gravest sins. In Hindu Tamil weddings in India and Sri Lanka, Ahalya appears as a symbolic black grinding stone, which the bride touches with her foot while promising not to be like Ahalya. The bride is also shown the star associated with the chaste Arundhati, who is cast as her ideal. The well-known treatise on sexual behaviour, the Kama Sutra (301–600), also mentions Ahalya and Indra while discussing how lust destroys men. However, it also urges men to seduce women by telling the romantic tales of Ahalya. The sixth-century Tamil epic Manimekalai alludes to her tale warning how the gods also do not remain untouched by illicit love.

The right-wing Hindu women's organisation Rashtra Sevika Samiti considers Ahalya the symbol of "Hindu woman's (and Hindu society's) rape by the outsider", especially British colonisers and Muslim invaders, but also Hindu men. The feminist writer Tarabai Shinde (1850–1910) writes that the scriptures, by depicting gods such as Indra who exploit chaste wives such as Ahalya, are responsible for promoting immoral ways; she asks why so much importance is then given to pativrata dharma, the devotion and fidelity to the husband which is said to be the ultimate duty of a wife.

A similar tale of divine seduction appears in Greek mythology, where Zeus, a king-of-the-gods figure akin to Indra, seduces Alcmene by assuming the form of her husband, resulting in the birth of the legendary hero Heracles. Like Ahalya, Alcmene falls victim to Zeus's trickery in some versions or, recognising his true identity, proceeds with the affair in others. The main difference between the tales is that the raison-d'être of Alcmene's seduction is the justification of Heracles's divine parentage, so she is never condemned as an adulteress or punished; in contrast, Ahalya faces the ire of the scriptures as her encounter is regarded as purely erotic (not resulting in procreation).

== See also ==
- List of characters in Ramayana
- Rishi

== Footnotes ==
Explanatory notes

Citations
