= Lata Desai =

Indian medical doctor (born 1941)

Dr. Lata Desai
- Born: 8 August 1941; Gujarat
- Occupation: Medical doctor
- Known for: Dr. Lataben Anilbhai Desai
- Spouse: Dr. Anil Desai
- Awards: Padma Shri award in 2022

Lata Desai (also known as Dr. Lataben Anilbhai Desai) (born 8 August 1941) is a medical doctor from the Indian State of Gujarat who is 1980 along with her husband Dr. Anil Desai and a few friends founded the Society for Education Welfare and Action - Rural (SEWA Rural), a voluntary organization devoted to health and development activities in the tribal area of South Gujarat.

== Education and career ==
After completing basic medical education at B J Medical College, Gandhinagar, Gujarat in the early '60s and getting married 1n 1968, Lata Desai and her husband moved to the US in 1972 for higher studies. In the US, Lata Desai specialized in pediatrics and Anil Desai in surgery. After completing their studies they started their careers in the US. However, after a few years, inspired by the lives and works of Mahatma Gandhi and Swami Vivekananda, they along with a few friends returned to India and established the non-profit SEWA Rural in Jhagadia, Bharuch district, Gujarat.

The services rendered by SEWA Rural include:

- Kasturba Hospital which offers round the clock emergency services, special care for women and children and people with eye diseases, separate clinics for Tuberculosis, Diabetes, and Infertility and Sickle Cell Disease
- Sharda Mahila Vikas Society was established in 2002 working towards the development of women, youth and children in villages of tribal, areas of Jhagadia, Gujarat
- Training Centre for Community Health
- Vocational Training Centre for Women
- Adolescent Awareness Programme which is aimed at reducing anemia, improving menstrual hygiene management, creating reproductive health awareness
- Community Health Project
- Comprehensive Eye Care Project
- Vivekananda Gramin Tekniki Kendra which is a vocational training center started in 1987

== Recognition: Padma Shri ==
- In the year 2022, Govt of India conferred the Padma Shri award, the third highest award in the Padma series of awards, on Lata Desai for her distinguished service in the field of medicine. The award is in recognition of her service as a "Doctor and Social Worker providing health services to tribal communities in Gujarat for over five decades".

== Additional reading ==
- Shanoo Bijlani (September 1990). "The Good Doctors of Jhagadia" (PDF). Reader's Digest: 125–132.
- "SEWA Rural – Exemplary of rural health delivery system". Indians for Collective Action. Archived from the original on 26 February 2022.

== See also ==
- List of Padma Shri award recipients (2020–2029)
