= SEWA Rural =

Indian non-governmental organization

- Established: 11 June 1980 (45 years ago)
- Legal status: trust
- Aim: improve the health of people in the rural and tribal areas of Jhagadia
- Country: India
- Website: sewarural.org

The Society for Education Welfare and Action-Rural (SEWA Rural) is a volunteer, development-oriented institution founded in 1980 to improve the health of people in the rural and tribal areas of Jhagadia in South Gujarat. The founders included Anil Desai, a surgeon; Lata Desai, a paediatrician; and Bankim Sheth, a science graduate.

SEWA Rural's 100-bed hospital in Jhagadia provides round-the-clock OPD and indoor and emergency services. The hospitals see approximately 70,000 outpatients and 12,000 inpatients every year and perform on average 2800 deliveries and 5000 surgeries. SEWA Rural also works in as many as 600 villages with the state government in healthcare and community health services, carrying out research and providing vocational training to the local residents, especially members of the tribal community. As many as 200 young people are trained in the Vivekananda Gramin Tekniki Kendra every year.

SEWA Rural has received awards from various institutions, including the World Health Organization (WHO) and the state government.
