= Ahalya Sthan =

Temple in Bihar

Coordinates: 26°18′45″N 85°48′52″E

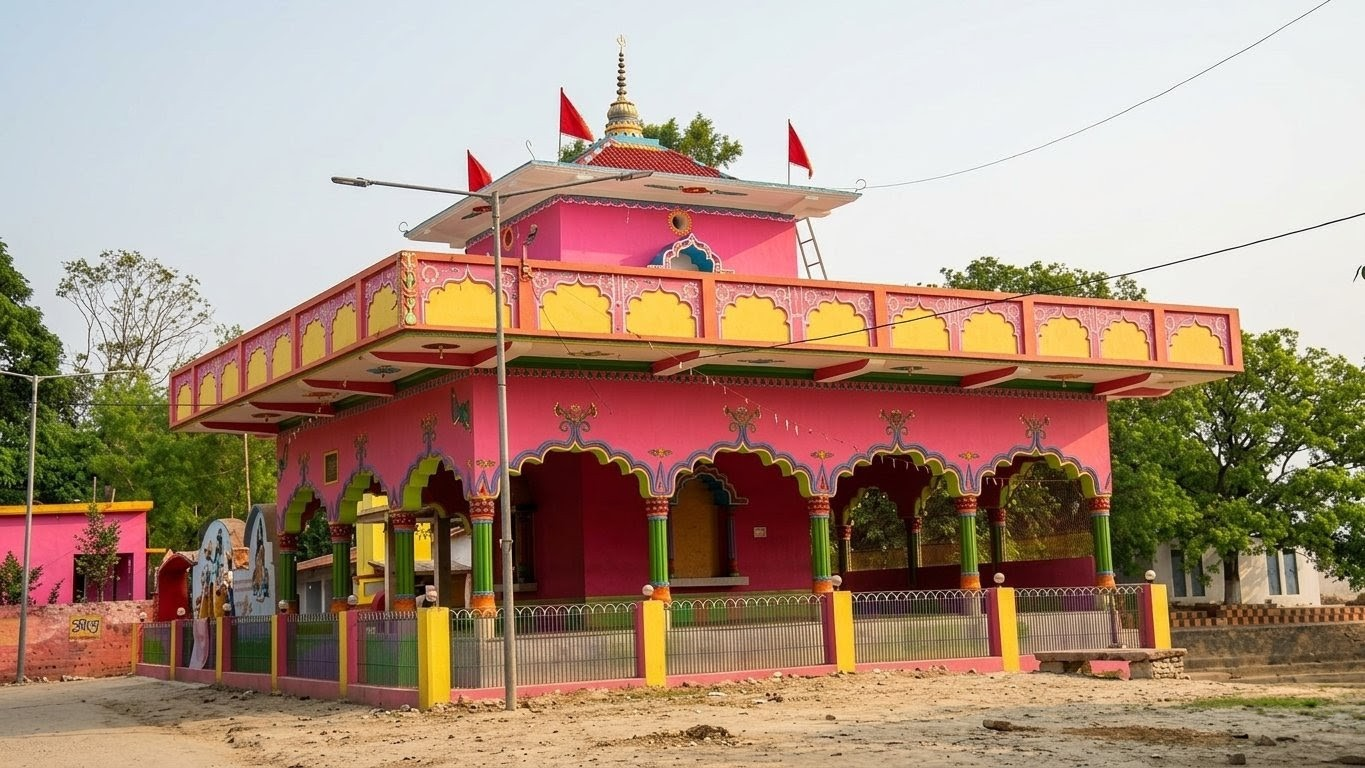
Ahalya Sthan Mandir, Gautam Ashram

Ahalya Sthan (also called Ahilya Sthan or Ahilya Asthan) is a Hindu temple located in Ward 11 of Kamtaul City in the Darbhanga District, State of Bihar, India. The temple is dedicated to Ahalya.

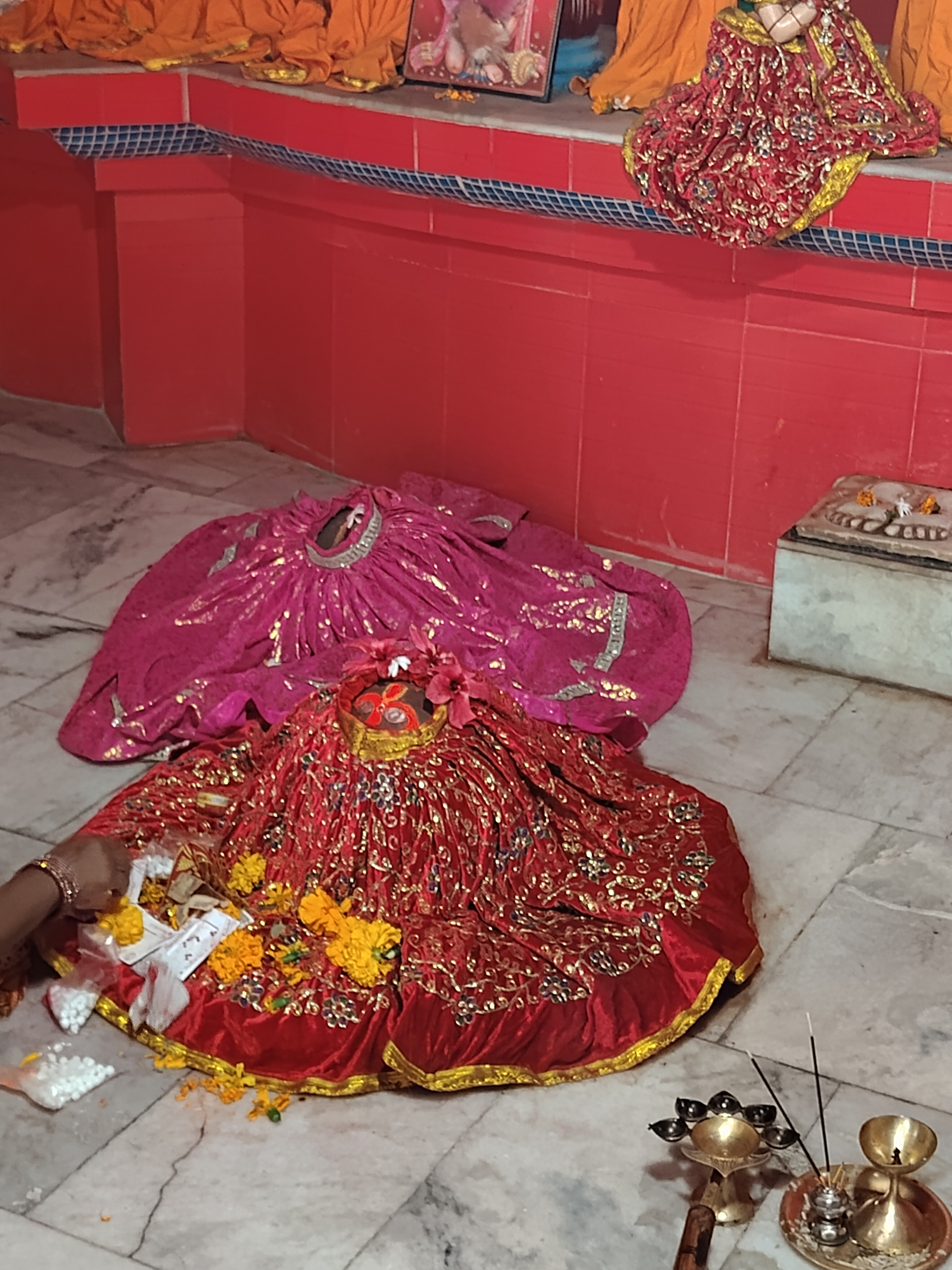
Devi Ahalya in Her Cursed Stone Form

== Legend ==
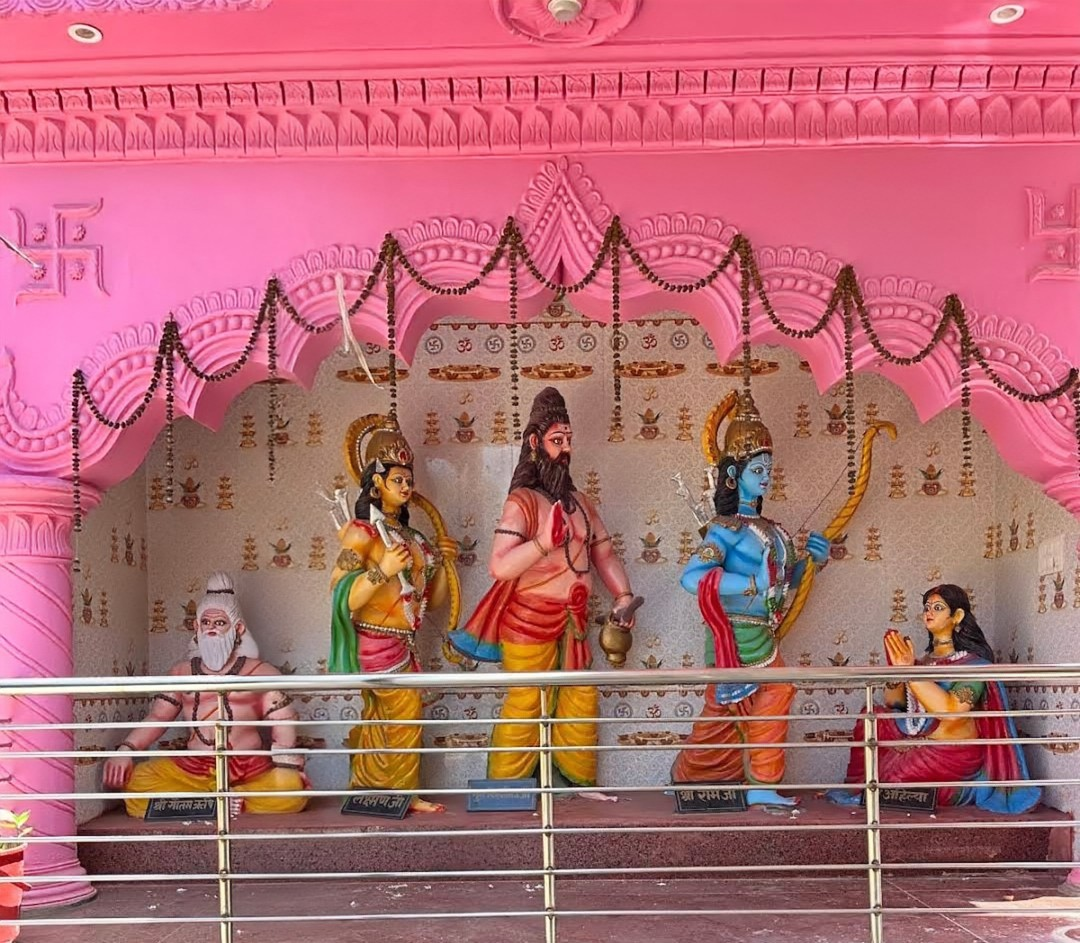
Statue of Devi Ahalya, Shree Ram, Shree Laxman, Maharshi Gautam, Maharshi Vishwamitra

According to Ramayana, Rama and Lakshmana went to forest with Brahmarshi Vishvamitra to protect his yagna. On their way, they came across a deserted place called as Gautam Ashram. When Rama inquired about the place, Visvamitra related the story of Sati Ahalya, wife of Gautama Maharishi. The Maharishi used to do penance by staying here with his wife. One day when Gautama Rishi had gone out of the ashram, in his absence, Indra came in disguised as Gautama Rishi. Ahalya, without knowing the real identity of the person, succumbed to Indra's desire. Gautam Maharishi came to know this and cursed his wife to lie as a stone in this place. When she pleaded, the maharishi said, when Rama visits this place, you will return to your normal self.

Visvamitra told Rama to go into the ashram. As soon as Rama's radiance brightened the place, Ahalya stood up with her own body and prayed to Rama. Ahalya being the wife of Maharishi, Rama and Lakshmana paid their obeisance to her.

== The temple ==
Ahalya Sthan is the place where once the ashram of Maharishi Gautama stood. The temple, in its present structural form was built between 1662 and 1682 during the rule of Maharaja Chhatra Singh and Maharaja Rudra Singh. This is also the first Ram Janaki temple in India.
