= Sudhanva - Janaka war =

A legendary war in the Ramayana

- Part of Valmiki Ramayana
Location	Mithila
Status	Victory of King Janaka
Territorial changes	Annexation of Samkashya in Mithila.

Kings
King Sudhanva	King Siradhwaja Janaka
- Period - Treta Yuga

Sudhanva - Janaka war refers to the legendary war between the King Janaka of Mithila and the King Sudhanva of Sāṅkāśya, in the epic Ramayana. The war was concluded with the death of the King Sudhanva by the King Janaka of Mithila. After the victory on the war by the King Janaka, the Kingdom of Sāṅkāśya was annexed into the Kingdom of Mithila. The war was initiated by the King Sudhanva of the Sāṅkāśya Kingdom. The war was initiated before the Sita Svayamvara at the court of King Janaka in Mithila. The war was initiated for the hand of the princess Sita of Mithila and the divine bow Pinaka kept at the court of King Janaka.

== Background ==
According to the text Valmiki Ramayana, once the King Sudhanva of Samkashya besieged the Kingdom of Mithila during the Sita Svayamvara. After that, he sent a peace proposal to the King Janaka on the condition that the princess Sita and the sacred bow Pinaka should be hand over to him. The King Janaka refused the proposal and consequently a war took place between the two kingdoms.

== Mentions ==
The war between the King Sudhanva and the King Janaka is mentioned in the Bala Kanda of the Valmiki Ramayana. The King Janaka, while describing his genealogy to the sage Vashishta at his court on the occasion of Sita Svayamvara, revealed about the war. He said,

कस्यचित्त्वथ कालस्य सांकाश्यादागतः पुरात् । सुधन्वा वीर्यवान् राजा मिथिलामवरोधकः ॥

— Valmiki, 1.71.16 - Balakanda, Ramayana

According to the above Shloka in the Ramayana, the King Sudhanva was a powerful ruler of the Samkashya Kingdom.
