= Gautam Ashram =

Hermitage of Gautam Rishi

Gautam Ashram (Sanskrit: गौतम आश्रम ) refers to the gurukul and residence hermitage of the ancient Vedic sage Maharshi Gautam in Mithila. In epic Ramayana, when Lord Rama along with teacher Vishwamitra and brother Lakshmana was traveling towards the Mithila Kingdom, they also came to the Gautam Ashram. There they stayed for some time. According Ramcharitmanas, Lord Rama freed Ahalya from the curse given by her husband Maharshi Gautam. It is the sacred place where the deliverance of Ahalya took place in the epic Ramayana.

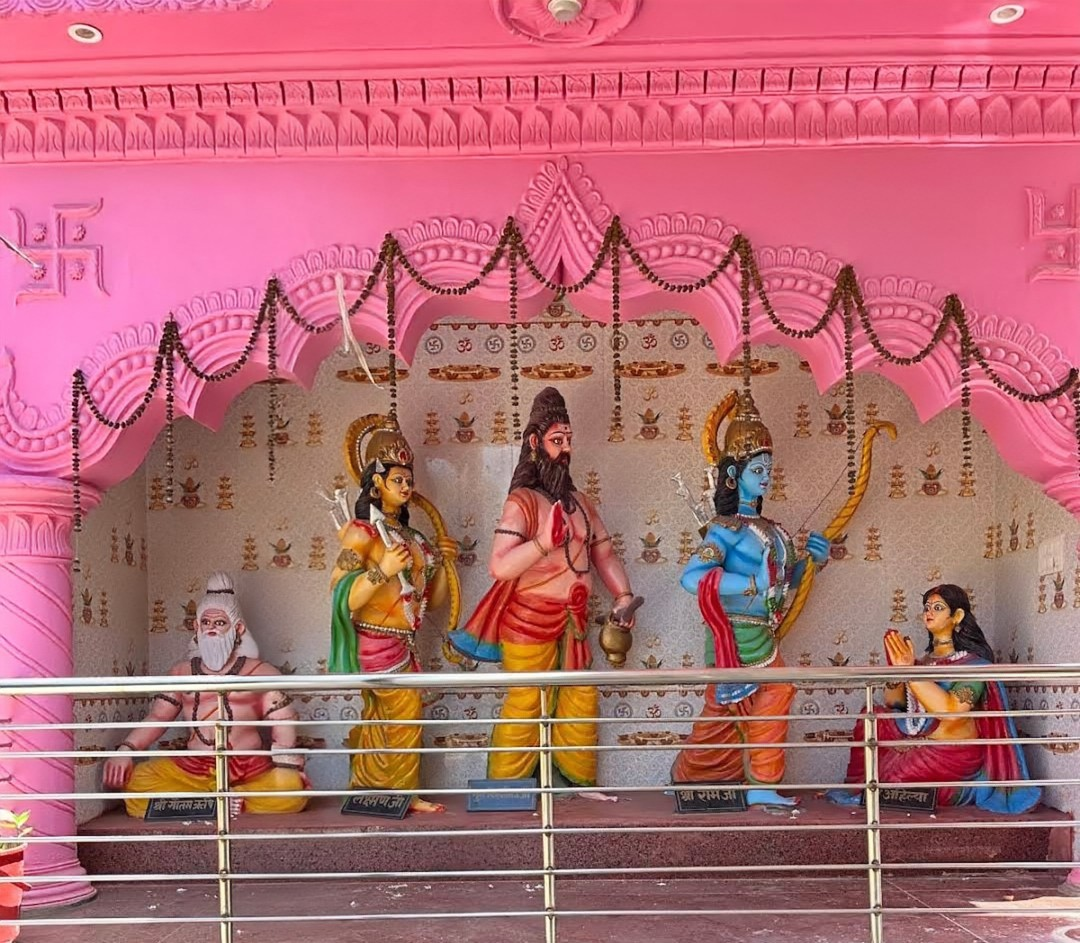
View of the Ahalya Sthan Mandir at the Gautam Ashram

== Description ==
In the epic Ramayana, Lord Rama after staying a night in Vishala, they moved towards the next place Gautam Ashram in Mithila. When he reached near it, he found the ashram in deserted and abandoned situation. Then he inquired about the miserable situation of the ashram with his teacher Vishwamitra. After that the teacher Vishwamitra told the story of the curse given to Ahalya by her husband Maharshi Gautam.

According to Ramayana, Maharshi Gautam was living at the outskirts of the Mithila city with his wife Ahalya. There in the ashram he composed Nyaya Sutra text of the Indian philosophy.
