= Dholi Dam =

Dam in Gujarat, India

- Location within Gujarat
- Interactive map of Dholi Dam
- Coordinates: 21.71274°N 73.3187983°E
- Purpose: Irrigation
- Opening date: 1995

Dam and spillways
- Type of dam: Earthen
- Impounds: Madhumati River
- Length: 1280 m

Reservoir
- Creates: Dholi Reservoir
- Total capacity: 983 TCM

Dholi Dam across the Madhumati River forms the Dholi Reservoir in Jhagadia city, Gujarat state, India.
