= Hrasvaroman Janaka =

King of Videha

- King Janaka
- Predecessor: Svarṇaroman
- Successor: Shreedhwaja Janaka
- Born: Hrasvaroman; Mithila
- Spouse: Keikasi
- Issue: Siradhwaja Janaka; Kushadhvaja
Era name and dates
- Vedic Period: Treta Yuga
Regnal name
- Mithila Naresh Hrasvaroman Janaka
- Country: Videha
- Country: Mithila Kingdom
- Dynasty: Janaka Dynasty
- Father: Svarṇaroman
- Religion: Hinduism

Hrasvaroman Janaka (Sanskrit: ह्रस्वरोमन् जनक) was the king of the Videha Kingdom in the Indian subcontinent. He was the twentieth Janaka in the lineage of the Janaka Dynasty in Mithila. He was the father of the famous King Shreedhwaja Janaka in Ramayana. He ruled the kingdom of Videha before the King Shreedhwaja Janaka.

== Description ==
Hrasvaroman was born in the royal family of the Janaka Dynasty in Mithila. He was the son of the King Svarṇaroman Janaka. He was the descendant of King Nimi, who was one of the sons of Ikshwaku. Thus he was also a descendant from the lineage of the Ikshwaku Dynasty in the Indian subcontinent. He was married to Keikasi. She gave birth to Shreedhwaja.

The King Hrasvaroman Janaka is mentioned in several major ancient texts of Hinduism. He is mentioned in the texts of Ramayana, Mahabharata and Puranas, etc. In the chapter 64 of the Brahmanda Purana, Goswami Suta explained to sages at Kurukshetra about the description of the lineage of the Nimi's dynasty. According to the verses 13-15 of the chapter 64, the names of the father and the grandfather of the King Hrasvaroman Janaka were Suvarṇaroman and Mahāroman respectively. It is also mentioned in Vayu Purana and Vishnu Purana.

Hrasvaroman was the grandfather of the princess Sita. In the Valmiki Ramayana, the King Shreedhwaja Janaka narrated the description of the succession and his dynasty to the sage Brahmarshi Vashishtha and all other present in the ceremony of the Sita Swayamvara. In the description, he said that he was the son of the King Hrasvaroman Janaka. According to the Valmiki Ramayana, the King Hrasvaroman Janaka handed over the charge of the Mithila Kingdom to his elder son Shreedhwaja, while taking sanyasa and retiring to forest. He also made Shreedhwaja as the caretaker of his younger son Kushadhwaja. After that Shreedhwaja ascended the throne of the Mithila Kingdom and became the twenty-first King Janaka in Mithila.
