= Shatananda =

Chief priest at the court of King Janaka

- शतानंद

Personal life
- Children: Satyadhṛti
- Parents: Maharshi Gautama (father); Ahalya (mother)
- Region: Mithila
- Education: Ancient Mithila University
- Occupation: Chief Priest

Religious life
- Religion: Sanatana Hinduism
- Lineage: Gautama
- Profession: Vedic Sage

Senior posting
- Post: Religious Advisor of King Janaka
- Period in office: Treta Yuga

Shatananda (Sanskrit: शतानंद) was a Vedic sage and the chief priest at the court of the King Siradhwaja Janaka in ancient Mithila. In the Valmiki Ramayana he is mentioned as the eldest son of the sage Maharshi Gautama and Devi Ahalya.

== Etymology ==
Shatananda is a compound Sanskrit word having two terms Shata and Ananda. The meaning of the first term Shata is hundred and good. And the meaning of the second term Ananda is who delights. Thus the compound meaning of the word Shatananda is to give somebody hundred times good and great pleasure.

== Early life ==
According to Ramayana, Shatananda was born in the region of ancient Mithila Kingdom. His father was Maharshi Gautama and mother was Ahalya. He was the eldest son of the couple Maharshi Gautama and Ahalya.

=== Education ===
He was educated in the patronage of the King Janaka in Mithila. He learned the Brahman Vidya from the King Janaka. He lived in the Gurukulas of Mithila and studied the Vedas there.

== Description ==
In Ramayana, Shatananda was a member of the court of King Janaka. He is mentioned as the Kulguru of the King Janaka. He was the chief priest and religious advisor at the court of King Janaka. He taught King Janaka about religious practices and philosophies. Once when there was a big famine in Mithila Kingdom, then it was Guru Shatananda who suggested King Janaka that the problem could be solved if he ploughed the field himself. He was also appointed by the King Janaka as a teacher of the princess Sita. It is said that he was radiant due to the practice of Yoga.

During Sita Swayamvara ceremony, sage Shatananda and King Janaka welcomed and gave due respect to Guru Vishwamitra along with his disciples princes Rama and Lakshmana. Shatananda was very happy to know that Lord Rama had restored his mother Ahalya's old purity. After knowing that the prince Rama had freed his mother Ahalya from the curse given by his father Maharshi Gautama, then sage Shatananda thanked a lot to Lord Rama. He also narrated the story of greatness of the Guru Vishwamitra to Lord Rama and Lakshmana. Shatananda played the role of high-priest in the marriage of Lord Rama and Goddess Sita. He suggested the auspicious date of formal marriage between the prince Rama and the princess Sita to the King Janaka and Dasharatha after the completion of Sita Swayamvara ceremony.
