= Samkashya =

Legendary city in the epic Ramayana

The Kingdom of Sāṃkāśya सांकाश्य
- Status: Annexed by Mithila Kingdom
- City: Sāṃkāśya
- Religion: Hinduism
- Demonym: Maithil
- Government: Monarchy
  - King of Sāṃkāśya: Kushadhwaja
  - Predecessor: Sudhanvan
  - Annexed by: Siradhwaja Janaka
- King of Sāṃkāśya
- Samkashyanatha (Lord of Sāṃkāśya)
- History
  - Established: Treta Yuga
- Today part of: Mithila region
- 1. Legendary city in Ramayana

Samkashya (Sanskrit: सांकाश्य, Romanised: Sāṃkāśya) is an ancient legendary city or kingdom mentioned in the Indian text Ramayana. According to the Hindu texts Ramayana and Puranas, the city of Sāṃkāśya was won by the King Janaka of the Mithila Kingdom during the war between the two Kingdoms initiated by the King Sudhanvan of the Sāṃkāśya city. It is said that the King Sudhanvan of the Sāṃkāśya city attacked the kingdom of Mithila. Then the King Janaka of the Mithila Kingdom countered the attack and in the war he killed the King Sudhanvan of Sāṃkāśya Kingdom. After winning the Kingdom of Sāṃkāśya, he crowned his brother Kuśadhvaja as King of the kingdom. The epic Ramayana refers Sāṃkāśya as the capital town of the King Kushadhwaja. After becoming the King of Sāṃkāśya, he was also called as Samkashyanatha translates as "Lord of Sāṃkāśya".

== Legend ==
According to legend, the city of Sāṃkāśya was previously ruled by the King Sudhanvan. The city of Sāṃkāśya was also called Sänkāśyapura. The King Sudhanvan of Sāṃkāśya was one of three powerful kings in the region of Videha empire during the age of Ramayana. During the period, there were three major cities in the region of Videha empire. They were Mithila, Sāṃkāśya and Vishala. Janaka was the emperor king in Mithila and Sumati was the king of Vishala city.

In the epic Ramayana, the king Sudhanvan of Sāṃkāśya sent a message to the King Janaka of Mithila that the sacred bow Pinaka of Lord Shiva and his daughter princess Sita be given to him. The King Janaka rejected the proposal, then the king Sudhanvan attacked on Mithila in response to the rejection of the proposal.
