= Balakanda =

Part of Ramayana describing Rama's childhood

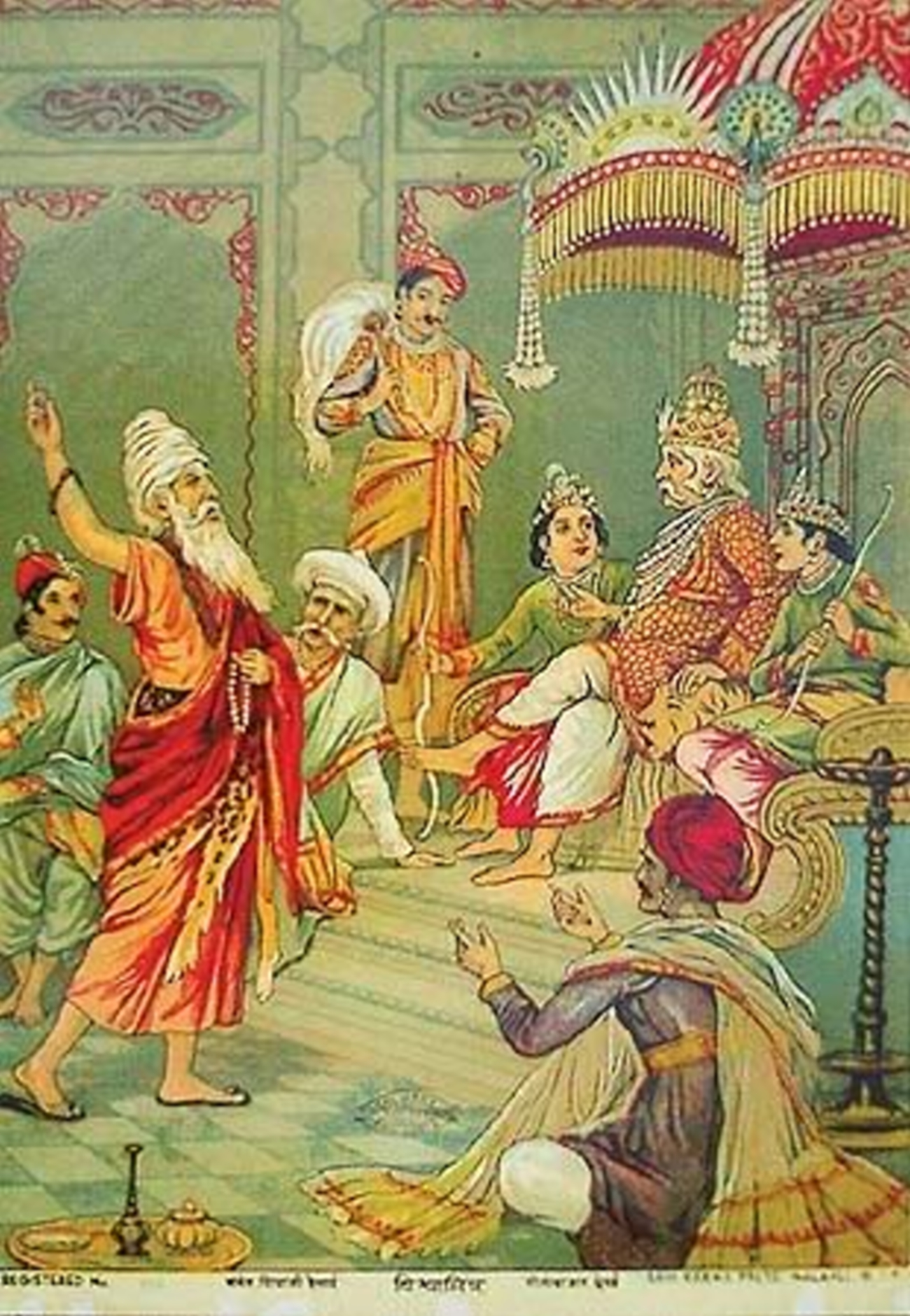
- Vishvamitra asks Dasharatha for help

Information
- Religion: Hinduism
- Language: Sanskrit

Bala Kanda (Sanskrit: बालकाण्ड; IAST: bālakāṇḍa', lit. 'Book on Childhood') is the first book of the Valmiki Ramayana. Bala Kanda, carries the central theme of the epic and serves as integral introduction to the Valmiki Ramayana. It narrates the birth of Rama, his childhood pastimes, and youthful adventures.

== Structure ==
The book consists of seventy-six sargas (sometimes translated as chapters or "cantos") of Sanskrit verse.

== Synopsis ==
The Bāla Kāṇḍa begins with the sage Vālmīki asking Nārada if there is a righteous man still left in the world, to which Nārada replies that such a man is Rāma. After seeing two birds being shot, Vālmīki creates a new form of meter called śloka, and then is granted the ability to compose an epic poem about Rāma. He teaches his poem to the boys Lava and Kuśa, who recite it throughout the land and eventually at the court of king Rāma, which then begins the main narrative.

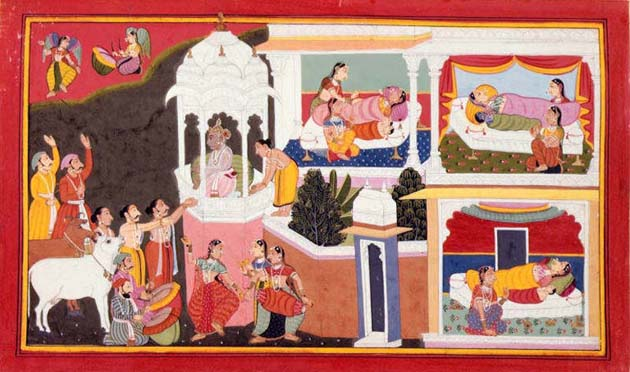
Pictorial depiction of the birth of the four sons of Dasharatha.

The king of Kosala, Daśaratha, lives in Ayodhyā, a utopian city, however he has no son. He and his court resolve to bring the sage R̥śyaśr̥ṅga in order to grant him sons. After the performance of an Aśvamedha (Horse Sacrifice), R̥śyaśr̥ṅga performs a Putrīyā Iṣṭi for the attainment of sons. Meanwhile the gods have petitioned to Brahmā and Viṣṇu about Rāvaṇa, a rākṣasa who has been oppressing rṣis, yakṣas, gandharvas, asuras, and brāhmaṇas. Due to a boon from Brahmā, Rāvaṇa is invincible to all beings except humans, so Viṣṇu decides to be born as the sons of Daśaratha. Back at the sacrifice outside Ayodhyā, a being emerges from the sacrificial fire carrying a celestial porridge. The being tells Daśaratha to distribute the porridge amongst his wives in order to bear sons. At the same time, Brahmā orders the gods to father monkey-sons who will assist Rāma later in the epic to defeat Rāvaṇa. After distributing the porridge, Daśaratha's wives Kausalyā, Kaikeyī, and Sumitrā bear Rāma, Bharata, and the twins Lakṣmaṇa and Śatrughna respectively. Years later, the sage Viśvāmitra arrives in Ayodhyā.

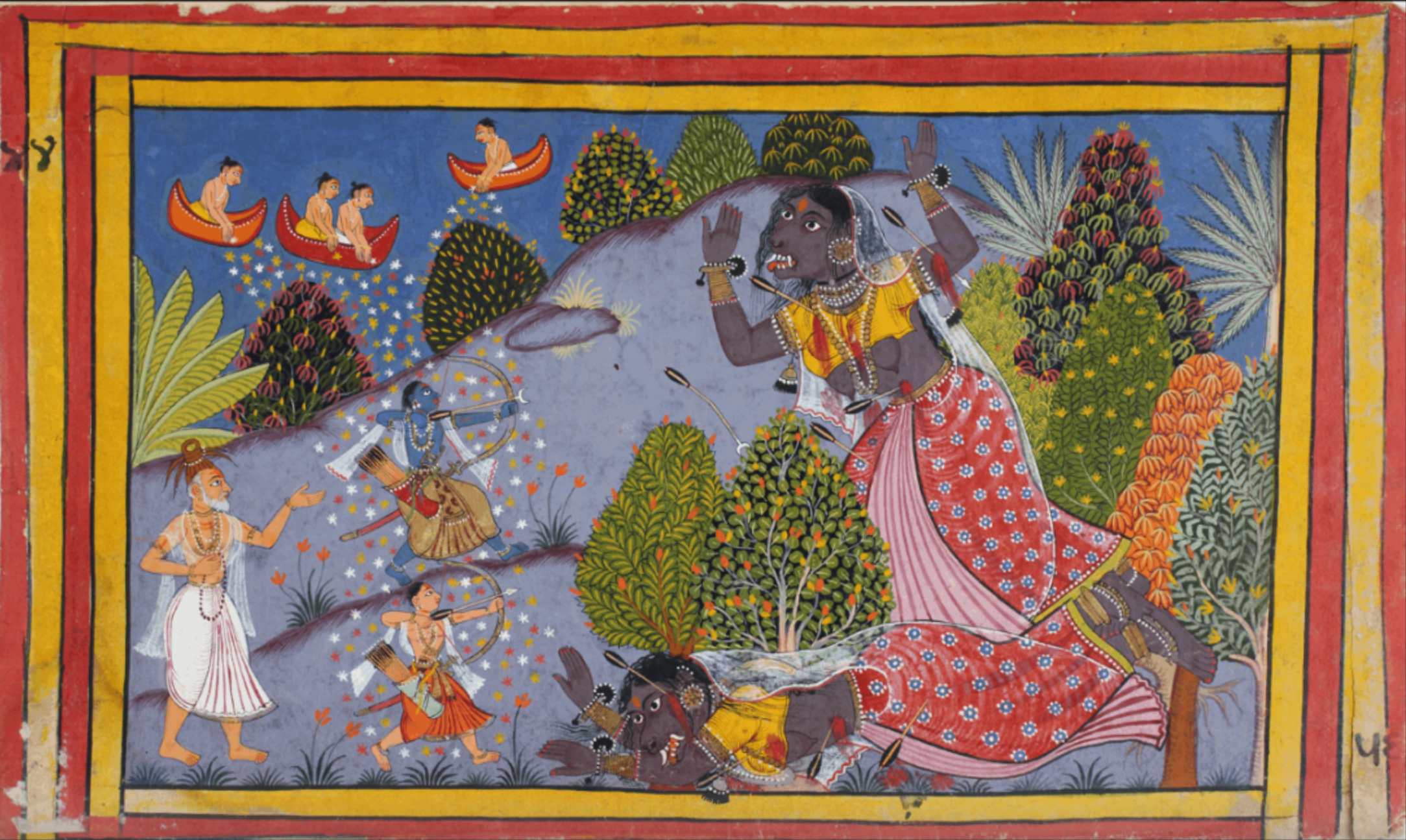
Rāma killing Tāṭaka from 17th century royal Mewar manuscript

Viśvāmitra requests Daśaratha to lend him his eldest (but still adolescent) son Rāma to slay the rākṣasas Mārīca and Subāhu, who are disrupting Viśvāmitra's sacrifice. Daśaratha, who is initially reluctant to part with his dearest son, is eventually convinced to send Rāma with Viśvāmitra, along with Lakṣmaṇa. Eventually they reach a terrible, wild forest inhabited by Tāṭakā. Tāṭakā, as Viśvāmitra explains, is a yakṣa woman who gave birth to the rākṣasa Mārīca, and was herself cursed to become a rakṣasa. Rāma kills her with a single shot from his bow, and in reward Viśvāmitra bestows on him numerous divine weapons. The party eventually reaches Viśvāmitra's ashram, where Rāma defeats Mārīca and kills Subāhu while Viśvāmitra completes his sacrifice.

The group, successful in their objective, then decide to go to attend king Janaka's sacrifice in the kingdom of Mithilā. There the seers at the ashram say that Janaka has a bow that no one has been able to string. Throughout the entire journey from Ayodhyā to the ashram to Mithilā, Viśvāmitra recounts the lore of the landscape the party travels through, as well as expounding on the deeds of the ancestors of Viśvāmitra and Rāma, respectively.

Once the group reaches Mithilā, a minister in Janaka’s court narrates the life of Viśvāmitra, and his journey from king to brahman-seer (“brahmarṣi”). Janaka recounts the history of the famed bow, and informs them that whoever strings the bow will win the hand of his daughter Sītā, whom he had found in the earth when plowing a field. Rāma then proceeds to not only string the bow, but snap it in the process. Rāma then marries Sītā, with the rest of his brothers marrying Sītā’s sister and cousins. On this occasion, the King Janaka describes his genealogy to the sage Vashishta and also reveals the war that took between him and the other King Sudhanva of Samkashya. On the way back from Mithilā to Ayodhyā, the procession encounters Rāma Jāmadagnya, who challenges Rāma to lift another bow and engage him in single combat. Rāma Dāśarathi seizes the bow and tells him that he will not kill him, and Rāma Jāmadagnya, now humbled, retreats. The book ends when the group returns to Ayodhyā and a scene is set for an idyllic married life.

== Critical reception ==
Some modern scholars have argued that some portions of the Bala Kanda are later additions. However, modern geographical and historical evidences also indicate substantial portions of the text belonging to the original stratum of the epic and clearly predating the Magadhan-era.

Goldman, Robert P. (1984). The Rāmāyaṇa of Vālmīki: An Epic of Ancient India, Volume I: Bālakāṇḍa (PDF). Princeton University Press. p. 67. ISBN 0-691-06561-6. "In conclusion, then, it would appear that previous scholarship has been overly harsh in its judgment of the genuineness of much of the Bālakāṇḍa. Examination of the first book shows that the fairly substantial portions of the text that deal directly with the early exploits of the epic hero are indeed known to the central books and are, on geographical and historical grounds, almost certainly products of the pre-Magadhan era. As such, it seems most probable that these portions of the Bālakāṇḍa formed part of the original stratum of the epic."
