= Gautama Maharishi =

Ancient Hindu sage

Maharishi Gautama
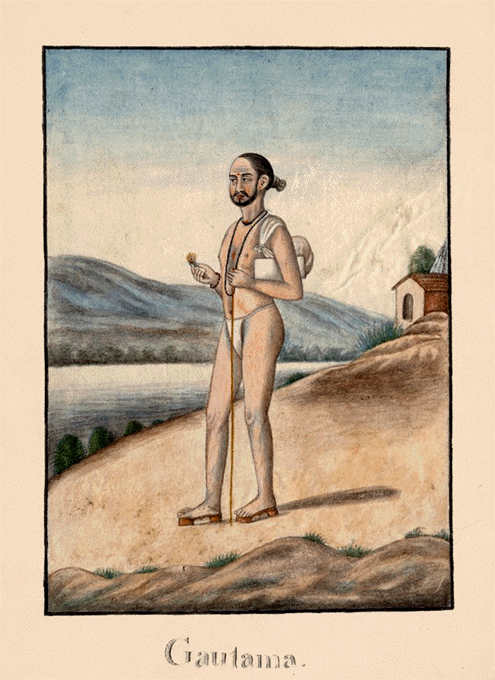
- An early 19th-century painting showing Maharishi Gautama

Personal life
- Spouse: Ahalyā
- Children: Shatananda and others
- Honors: One of the Saptarishis (Seven Great Sages Rishi)

Religious life
- Religion: Hinduism

Gautama (Sanskrit: महर्षिः गौतम, IAST: Maharṣiḥ Gautama) was a sage in Hinduism and son of Brahmin sage Dirghatamas who is also mentioned in Jainism and Buddhism. Gautama is mentioned in the Yajurveda, Ramayana, and Gaṇeśa Pūrana and is known for cursing his wife Ahalyā. Another important story related to Gautama is about the creation of river Godavari, which is also known as Gautami.

== Children ==
According to the Ramayana, Gautama's eldest son with Ahalya is Shatananda. But according to the Adi Parva of Mahabharata, he had two sons named Sharadvana and Cirakari. Sharadvana was also known as Gautama, hence his children Kripa and Kripi were called Gautama and Gautami respectively. A daughter of Gautama is referred too, but her name is never disclosed in the epic. In the Sabha Parva, he is described to beget many children through Aushinara (daughter of Ushinara), amongst whom the eldest in Kakshivata. Gautama and Aushinara's wedding takes place at Magadha, the kingdom of Jarasandha. According to the Vamana Purana, he had three daughters named Jaya, Jayanti, and Aparajita.

Gautama is also have said to be the ancestor of Shvetaketu, son of Uddalaka Aruni in the Brihadaranyaka Upanishad.

== Ahalyā's curse ==
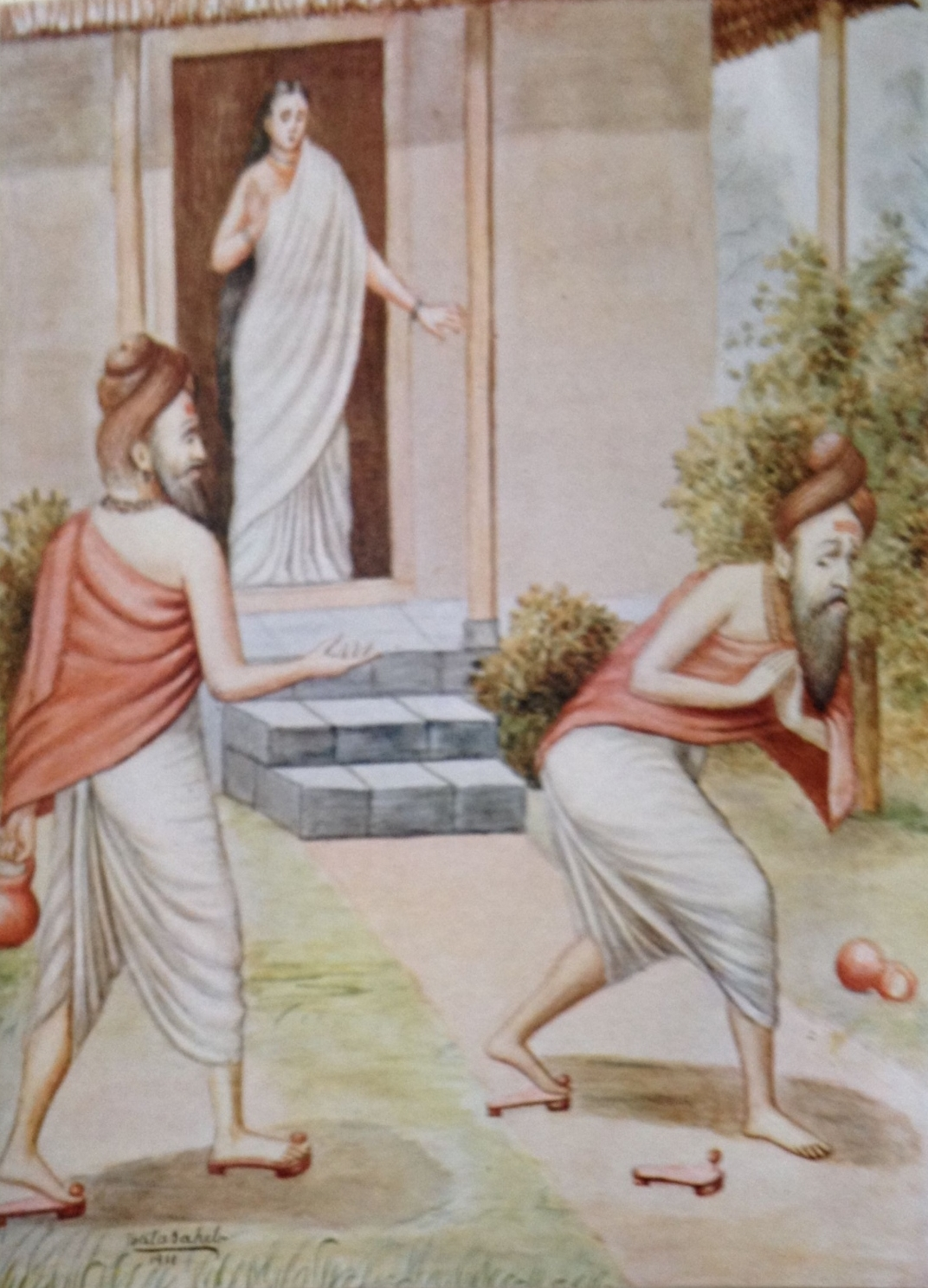
Gautama (left) discovers Indra disguised as Gautama fleeing, as Ahalya watches.

The Gaṇeśa Purāṇa and Ramayana describes Ahalyā as his wife. Their marriage is recorded in the Uttara Khaṇḍa, which is believed as an interpolation to the epic. As per the story Brahma, the creator god, creates a beautiful girl and gifts her as a bride to Gautama and a son named Shatananda is born.

The Upāsanā Khaṇḍa mentions Gautama cursing Indra when he comes home and finds Indra in an argument with his wife. It is revealed that Indra disguised as Gautama had sexual intimacy with Ahalyā and he curses Indra with 1000 vaginas and turns Ahalyā into a stone until Rāma steps on her. Indra is eventually returned to normal after Gautama recites a mantra, and finds greatness in Gaṇeśa that he reveals to the Devas. and Ahalyā is graced by Rāma's foot.

== Upaniṣads ==
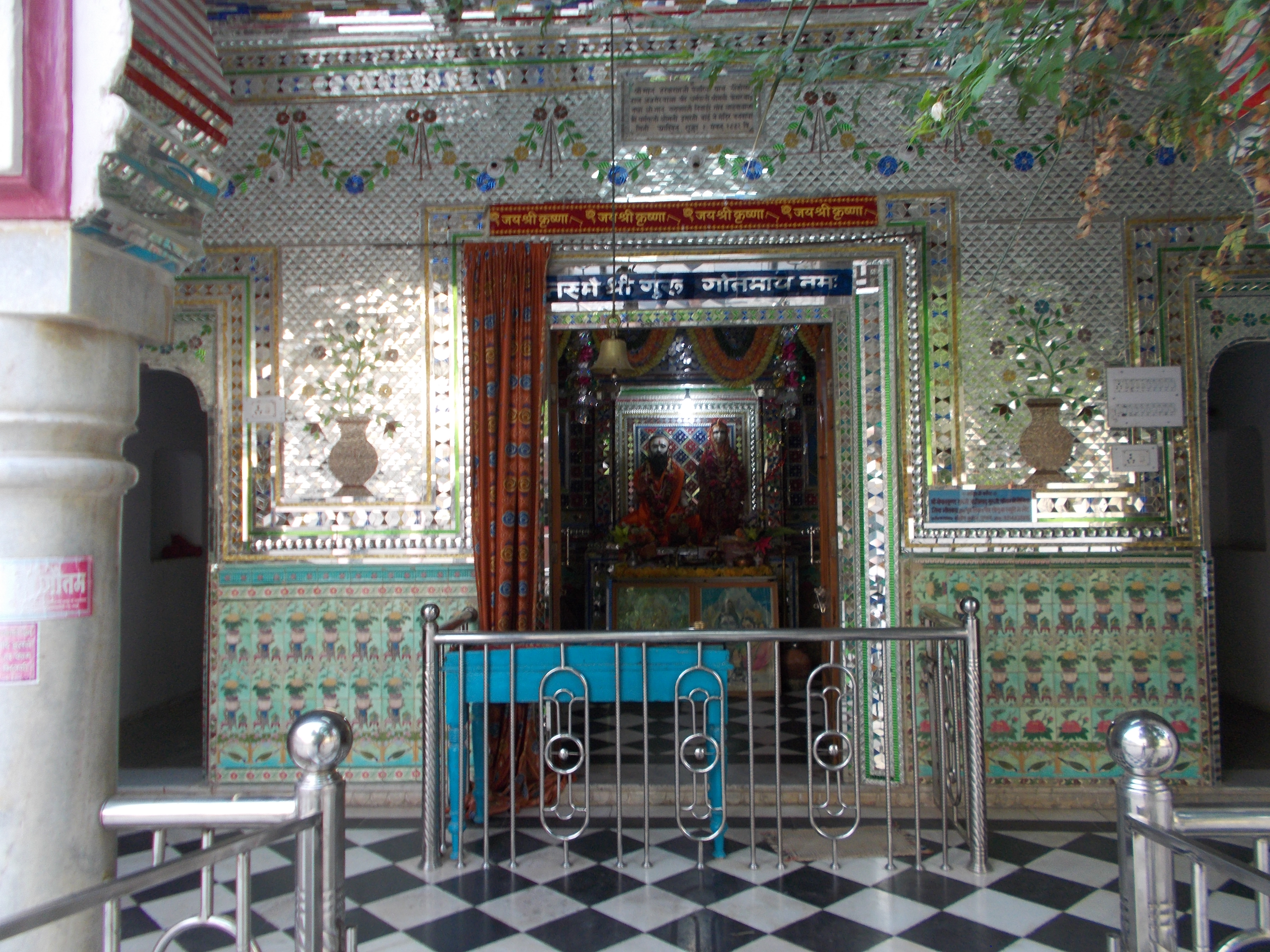
Shrine of Gautama Maharishi at Matha Ahalya Temple, Pushkar

Gautama is mentioned in two tales inside Bṛhadāraṇyaka Upaniṣad. He speaks to Yajñavalkya with Uddālaka Āruṇi, Gārgī Vāchaknavī and other Kuru and Pañcāla sages in King Janaka's kingdom to test to see if Yajñavalkya is a great sage.

He also has a conversation with Pravāhaṇa Jaivali after Jaivali meets Śvetaketu and requests to meet his father. Jaivali promises to grant Gautama a boon, and describes the beauty and depth of the physical world, and teaches him how to perform yajña.
