= Zaghadia =

Jhagadia Jhagadiaji
- town
- Location in Gujarat, India Jhagadia (India)
- Coordinates: 21°43′35″N 73°09′02″E
- Country: India
- State: Gujarat
- District: Bharuch

Languages
  - Official: Gujarati, Hindi
- Time zone: UTC+5:30 (IST)
- PIN: 393110
- Vehicle registration: GJ-16
- Nearest city: Bharuch/ Ankleshwer
- Literacy: 65%
- Avg. summer temperature: 43 °C (109 °F)
- Avg. winter temperature: 20 °C (68 °F)
- Website: gujaratindia.com

Zhagadia (also spelled Jhagadia) is a taluka in Bharuch district in the state of Gujarat, India. Zhagadia is located 2 mi (3.2 km) south of the southern bank of the Narmada River. It is southeast of the historic town ShuklaThirth, where Chanakya apparently lived until he returned to Pataliputra (now Patna). The economy of Zhagadia is dependent on industrial area (GIDC) and the fertile land where bananas, sugar cane, cotton, wheat, sorghum, and other vegetables and fruits are grown and exported. Trade to the interior villages, local government offices, and Seva Rural Hospital and local businesses provide most of the employment.

In Zhagadia is the town Bhalod, on the Narmada riverbank, across from another town, Koral. Bhalod is known for farming bananas, cotton, and sugar cane, although it suffers from a high rate of emigration, primarily to the United States, Canada, United Kingdom, and Africa. The town has cultural activities, such as the three-day program of Gangadashahara. During this period, many Brahmins from various parts of Gujarat and elsewhere travel to Bhalod to be "blessed" by their "holy River" Narmada", in celebration of the 'birth' of the "holy River" Ganges. Bhalod has a number of temples, including Ramnath Mahadev, Mokshnath Mahadev, Datatrey, Ranchhodnathji & Gayatri Mata.

== Industries ==
Gujarat Industrial Development Corporation has developed a megaindustrial estate in Zhagadia. Companies there include: Abbott Laboratories, Saint-Gobain, PepsiCo, United Phosphorus, Gulbrandsen Technologies, Kohler, S. Kumar, Century Textile and Industries, Aarti Industries Limited, BEC Fertilizers Limited, Welspun, Brakes India and Agrotech (an affiliate of ConAgra).

== Education ==
For students too young for high school, the public schools are divided into male and female schools. Zaghadia has an all-female primary and middle school and an all-male primary and middle school. Two high schools serve the local population. The oldest high school is Diwan Dhanji Shah High School, which was founded in 1942 by Diwan of Rajpipla's King, a group of concerned citizens in response to the lack of public education in the remote region. The result of their efforts, at least in part, was that the strength of the education program in the 1950s and 1960s was noted throughout Gujarat.

A private school, Manav School, also exists in Zaghadia.

== Tourism ==
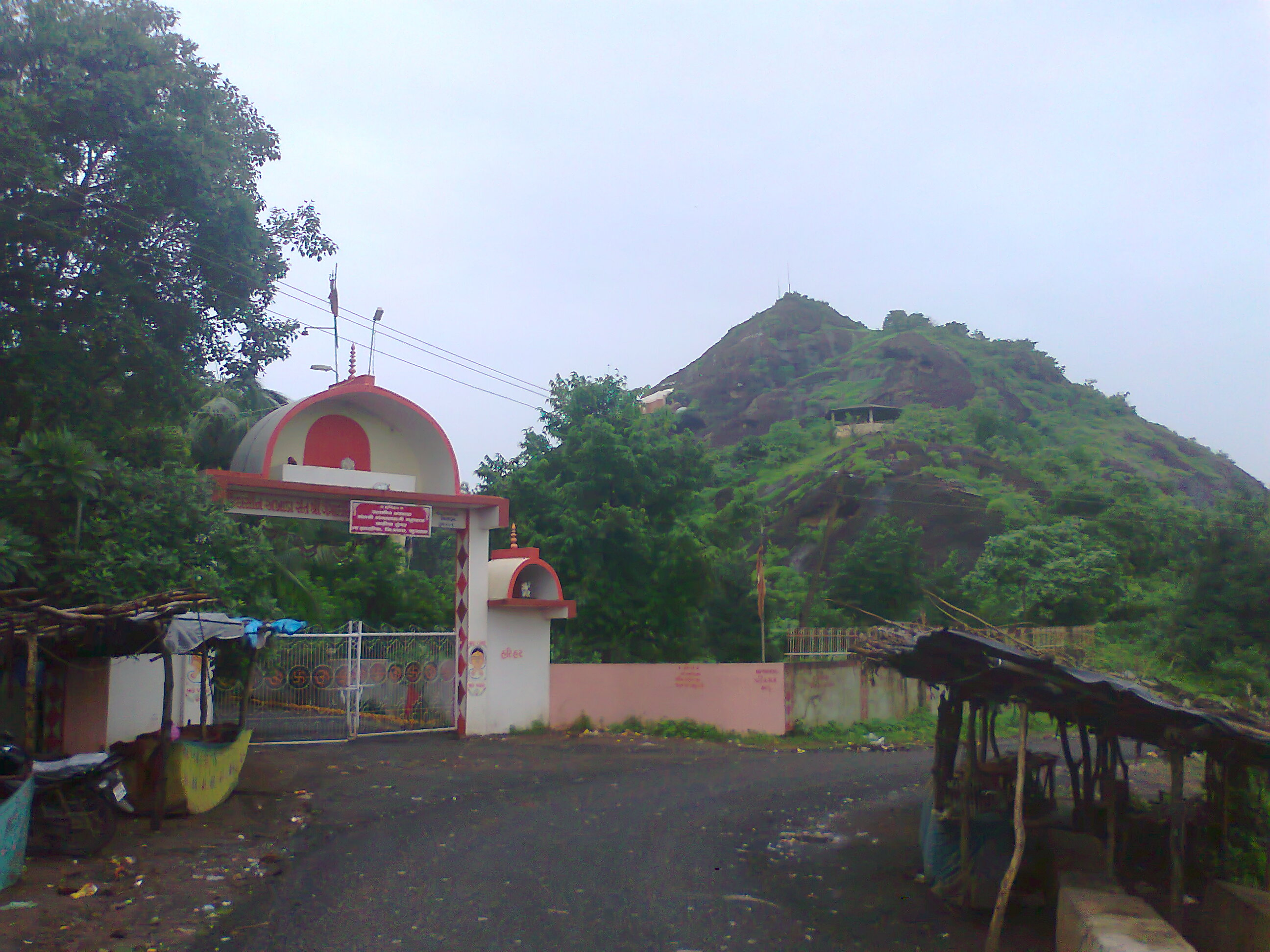
Kadiya Dungar in Jhagadiya Tehsil near Zazpor village

Places to visit include: Jain Daherasar, Kabirvad, Gayatri Mandir, Dholi Reservoir, and Hanuman Temple. Trips to banana farms and a ride in bullock cart in fields are popular experiences.

Gumandev, an old temple of the Hindu god Hanuman, is a holy place for Hindus in Bharuch, 3 km (1.9 mi) from Zhagadia.
