= Vaisali (film) =

Vaishali
- Theatrical release poster
- Directed by: Bharathan
- Written by: M. T. Vasudevan Nair
- Produced by: Atlas Ramachandran
- Starring: Suparna Anand; Sanjay Mitra; V. K. Sreeraman; Ashokan; Geetha; Babu Antony; Nedumudi Venu
- Cinematography: Madhu Ambat
- Edited by: Bharathan
- Music by: Ravi
- Production company: Chandrakanth Films
- Distributed by: Chandrakanth Films
- Release date: 25 August 1988
- Country: India
- Language: Malayalam
- Box office: ₹1 crore (US$100,000)

Vaisali is a 1989 Indian Malayalam-language epic mythological drama film directed and edited by Bharathan. Produced by M. M. Ramachandran and scripted by M. T. Vasudevan Nair, it was an adaptation of a sub-story told by Vedavyasa to Yudhishthira in the epic Mahabharatha. It is the story of Vaisali, a devadasi girl who was assigned the mission of seducing Rishyasringa, the son of Vibhandaka and bringing him to Champapuri to perform a Yajna to bring rain.

== Plot ==
Years ago, a certain Brahmin had visited the kingdom of Anga. Lomapadan, the king of Anga, failed to pay respect to the Brahmin. The Brahmin cursed the king that his kingdom would not experience any rains and would suffer a severe drought. Thus, Anga suffered for almost twelve years.

Lomapadan, having had enough, decides to visit his rajguru to seek for a solution. The rajguru was now living at the outskirts of the kingdom's capital Champapuri to dissuade his own son, Chitrangadan, from unwanted activities. Chitrangadan was a rebel who did not follow his father's footsteps and was bent on breaking the social norms laid down by the society at that time. However, Chitrangadan's heart was set on Vaishali, a girl who hailed from the kingdom's community of dancing girls. Vaishali, on the other hand, did not reciprocate Chitrangadan's feelings.

Meanwhile, the rajguru visits the kingdom on Lomapadan's request and decides to perform rituals to propitiate the rain god Indra, while also knowing that by performing such rituals nothing will bear fruit. However, one night, the rajguru gets a vision from his own guru that to bring rains to the kingdom, the rituals were to be performed by Rishyashringa, the young son of the great sage Vibhandakan. For this, Rishyashringa had to be brought to the kingdom by any means. When Lomapadan enquired, the rajguru stated that Rishyashringa could be brought to the kingdom by enticing him with the women of the kingdom since the young sage had never seen a woman or a girl throughout his life. For this, the king decides to appoint the young Vaishali to embark on the dangerous mission, by order of the rajguru. Accompanied by her mother, Malini, and her companions, Vaishali sets off for the forests where Rishyashringa lived via the Kaushiki river.

When the dancing girls reach the forests, Vaishali introduces herself to the young sage as a hermit herself. By seductive means, she manages to lure Rishyashringa into her fold, despite warnings from his father Vibhandakan. Thus the young couple have many a lovely moments for each other. However, Vibhandakan again senses something fishy and rebukes his son for not following the routine rituals and instead frolicking around like an aimless man even after innumerable warnings. Rishyashringa realises his mistakes and decides to focus on his yogic path as before while trying to avoid his lady love. Vaishali is pained at seeing him in his present condition, while at this moment she also comes in terms that she is truly in love with Rishyashringa. Her mother also reveals that Vaishali was the illegitimate child of the king Lomapadan and that if they were successful in their mission, the king would whole heartedly accept her as his daughter and also have her married to Rishyashringa. Thus, Vaishali decides to attempt one last time into luring him by seductively dancing in front of him during his penance. Unable to control his feelings, Rishyashringa gives in and accompanies Vaishali to her home.

However, he senses something dreadful and realises that whatever happened to him till that point was a mere illusion and was bent on placing a curse on Vaishali by accusing her of being a demon in disguise. When she pleads him to not curse her, she reveals her true identity and that she was just a mere human woman. She further explains the reason of her mission and her feelings for him. Rishyashringa is convinced and the couple decide to set off for Angarajyam.

Rishyashringa is welcomed to the kingdom with due respect and performs the rituals for the rains. After a while, there is a heavy shower of rains and the whole kingdom rejoices, including the royal family as well. At this point, the king announces his daughter's hand in marriage to the young sage, declaring that the child born out of this marriage would rule Anga after Lomapadan. As Vaishali and her mother try to step into the ritual podium to claim their rights, the rajguru and the soldiers block them to prevent their entry. Instead of keeping his word, Lomapadan offers his daughter Shanta's hand in marriage to Rishyashringa. As the crowds follow the newly weds' chariot, Vaishali and her mother are trampled in the stampede where her mother dies eventually. Vaishali is left alone, heartbroken and devastated at what had happened, for nobody bothered about her anymore. What lies ahead of her remains unknown, as she is left to fend for herself.

== Cast ==
- Suparna Anand as Vaisali (Voice by Sreeja Ravi)
- Sanjay Mitra as Rishyashrungan
- Geetha as Malini (voice by Anandavally)
- Babu Antony as Lomapadhan (vocie by Narendra Prasad)
- Nedumudi Venu as Rajaguru
- V. K. Sreeraman as Vibhandaka
- Parvathy Jayaram as Shanta
- Valsala Menon
- Ashokan as Chandrangadan
- Jayalalita as Vershini

== Production ==
=== Development ===
Development on the film began roughly a decade before it was released. Bharathan had entertained the story in his mind for eight to ten years. Bharathan had approached several producers with the script. However, they were hesitant due to the parallel cinema tone to the subject matter, but finally Atlas Ramachandran agreed to produce the film. Bharathan had been planning to film Vaisali since 1982. But several factors made him wait till 1988. Bharathan announced the film in the mid-1980s under the title Rishishringa. Vaishali also marks the debut production venture of Ramachandran's Chandrakanth Films. This also was the first script by M. T. Vasudevan Nair for Bharathan. The editing and also the adverts (assisted by Sasi Menon) of the film were done by Bharathan himself.

=== Casting ===
Auditions were conducted by Bharathan and Ramachandran for the lead roles. Actress Suparna Anand had done an album at that time and was brought via an agency team. While the roles of Rishyashrungan and Vaishali were set. Bharathan then, met Babu Antony in Bombay (now Mumbai). As Bharathan was then working on Chilambu (1986), he decided to launch Babu Antony as the main antagonist in it. After which Bharathan asked Antony to join the cast of Vaishali with the role of King Lomapadan. Antony was in his early career and felt that historical roles were not meant for him and turned down the offer. A month later, Bharathan called Antony and asked him to come to Mysore. When he reached the location, he realized that Bharathan was conducting the audition for the role of King Lomapadan. Despite hesitating, Bharathan asked Antony to wear the costume after which he took a few snaps. After the stills were developed, Bharathan told Antony that he was doing the role. Sreeja Ravi has given voice for Suparna Anand and Krishnachandran for Sanjay Mitra. Anandavally and Narendra Prasad lent voice for Geetha and Babu Antony respectively.

== Soundtrack ==
All lyrics are written by O. N. V. Kurup; all music is composed by Bombay Ravi.

Track listing
No.	Title	Artist(s)	Length
1.	"Dum Dum Dum Dundubhinaadam"	Dinesh, Lathika, Choir
2.	"Indraneelimayolum"	K. S. Chithra
3.	"Indupushpam"	K. S. Chithra
4.	"Poomullakkaattil"	K. S. Chithra
5.	"Theduvathethoru"	K. S. Chithra

== Reception ==
The film was commercial success, completing a 145-day run in theatres. In a trade analysis by written by Sreedhar Pillai and published in India Today on 31 December 1988, he wrote that Vaishali had "broken several box office records". He also expressed his concern over employing actors from Bombay, writing, "Even here the lead actors - Sanjay and Swoparnika - were brought in from Bombay, showing the dearth of talent in the state." He wrote that the film collected over ₹1 crore from the Kerala box office.

Sreedhar Pillai of India Today called the film "refreshing." Nikhat Kazmi published review of Vaishali in The Times of India writing, "Creativity of high order and excellent teamwork make Vaishali in Malayalam a rare film with an engrossing story and a universal appeal." A critic from Chandrika wrote, "As far as films based on the Mahabharata are concerned, Vaishali is a breath of fresh air." They singled out Madhu Ambrat for praise writing that his "beautiful" cinematography "deserves an applause".

Writing for Screen India, a critic wrote, "M. T. Vasudevan Nair's narration of the episode brings it startlingly into focus as a topical event complete with the intrigues, manipulations and trickery one associates with statecraft Nair's dialogue is full of present-day punches and relevant connotations, the telling social comments, the offers through many of the characters in the film reveal the masterly touches of Malayalam cinema's most highly priced scriptwriter." They also praise the technical aspects of the film, writing, "The technical qualities of the film are equally of a high caliber to bring to the screen this universal theme producer Ramachandran and the director Bharathan assembled what they claim is a 'national' cast."

On 24 August 2018, Litty Simon of Onmanorama termed the film "a cult classic" and wrote, "Envy, revenge, love, seduction, a curse and its alleviation -- what more can you ask of a story? Indeed, a piece of craft!" On 30 July 2008, on the event of Bharathan's tenth death anniversary, P. K. Ajithkumar of The Hindu called Vaishali one of Malayalam cinema's "prettiest." and called it one of Bharathan's best works. On 11 December 2022, Vaishali was screened at the International Film Festival of Kerala to a packed theatre. The film was screened in the Homage category of the festival in memory of M. M. Ramachandran. In December 2020, Neelima Menon from The News Minute called Vaishali "a timeless work of art" and wrote, "Bharathan is a proven wizard in outlining the man-woman relationship in all its sensuality."

Numerous films, including Vaisali, demonstrate world-class cinematography, according to Madhu Ambat, the film's cinematographer (March 2025). However, when watching these movies today, their cinematography no longer appears to maintain the same level of quality. The primary reason for this is that the old negatives are not carefully preserved.

== Awards ==
National Film Award – 1988

Category	Recipient	Notes
Best Female Playback Singer	K. S. Chithra	For Indhupushpam
Best Lyricist	O. N. V. Kurup	For Indhupushpam

Kerala State Film Awards – 1988

Category	Recipient	Notes
Best Female Playback Singer	K. S. Chithra	For Indhupushpam
Best Lyricist	O. N. V. Kurup	For Indhupushpam
Best Art Director	P. Krishnamoorthy	
