= Siya Ke Ram =

Indian mythological television series based on Ramayana

- Also known as: Maryada Purushottam Siya Ke Ram
- Genre: Mythology
- Based on: Ramayana
- Developed by: Anirudh Pathak
- Written by: C.L.Saini
- Screenplay by: C.L.Saini; Bhavna Vyas
- Story by: C.L.Saini
- Directed by: Nikhil Sinha; Dharmesh Shah; Pradeep Jadhav; Animesh Verma
- Theme music composer: Sandeep Mukherjee
- Opening theme: Siya Ram
- Composers: Sunny Bawra; Inder Bawra; Jitesh Panchal; Sushant Pawar
- Country of origin: India
- Original language: Hindi
- No. of seasons: 1
- No. of episodes: 305

Production
- Executive producer: Animesh Verma
- Producer: Nikhil Sinha
- Running time: 20 minutes
- Production company: Triangle Film Company

Original release
- Network: StarPlus
- Release: 16 November 2015 – 4 November 2016

Siya Ke Ram (transl. Sita's Ram) is an Indian devotional television series, starring Madirakshi Mundle, Ashish Sharma and Karthik Jayaram. It was produced by Nikhil Sinha under Triangle Film Company. The serial presents the epic Ramayana, depicting the story of Lord Ram and Devi Sita from Sita's perspective. On 16 November 2015, it was premiered on Star Plus.

== Plot ==
The main plot is taken from the Hindu epic Ramayana, which was written by Sage Valmiki, and Adbhuta Ramayan, and follows the story through devi Sita's perspective.

== Ramayana Kands ==
=== Baal Kand ===
When Mithila suffers from a drought for twelve years, its childless King Janak builds a golden plough and unearths a baby girl as he begins to plough. The baby's first cry leads to rainfall. Rishi Yagyavalkya suggests that Janak keep the baby and so he names her Sita. Soon after, Janak and his wife have another daughter they name her as Urmila. Janak's younger brother Kushadhwaja also have two daughters Mandavi and Shrutakirti. After eight years, King Dasharatha is travelling to Guru Vashistha's ashram to see his sons. Ram learns that he has an elder sister called Shanta. Later, it is shown that both Ram and Sita have grown up.

In Ayodhya, King Dasharatha conducts the Ashwamedha Yajna for the well-being of his sons and his kingdom. While travelling towards Mithila, Sita dares to stop the ceremonial horse and comforts it. After coming back, Ram tells not to kill the horse but spare its life. Guru Vishvamitra takes Ram and Lakshman from Ayodhya to destroy the demoness queen Tataka. Sita and her sisters also travel along with Kushadhwaja to see Guru Vishvamitra. Soon Taraka and her son Subahu are killed by Ram and Lakshman. Guru Vishvamitra tells him that he wants to take both of them to Mithila and seek the blessings of Shiv Dhanush. While travelling to Mithila, he sees Rishi Gautam and Ahilya's ashram and cures her curse. Gautam Rishi seeks his greatness to Ram. Meanwhile, Sita learns about her birth. Sita falls in love with Ram without seeing him. Ram comes to Mithila, and they meet for the first time at the Parvati temple with them Lakshman and Urmila also meet with each other. Soon after, Sita's Swayamvar is announced. Lanka king Ravana's grandfather and minister Malyavan travels to Mithila to see the greatness of the kingdom and argues with Sita, but it is stopped by Urmila as she becomes angry that how did he do this thing and speaking to the princess like this .Then he informs Ravana that Tataka is killed.

In the Swayamvara, nobody can lift the Shiv Dhanush except Ram. Ram's marriage is fixed with Sita. Later, when Sita and Urmila go to the river Lakshman pours water over Urmila by mistake and they begin to argue while Ram prevents a flood coming in the kingdom, that is created by a serpent which is sent by Ravan to vow revenge on Janak for not lifting the shiv dhanush. Urmila is attacked by the same serpent but Lakshman saves her and show the Asur serpent his Sheshanag avatar. The serpent does not attack him as he is their king. Lakshman and Urmila begin to love each other and indirectly express their feelings to their brother and sisters. Ram along with Urmila‘s sisters tease her and Lakshman about the same.

Afterwards, king Dasharath comes to Mithila and Urmila becomes vidhikari (the lady which takes care of all the rituals of the marriage).

Ravan learns that he will die because of a woman and remembers the day he tried to force himself upon a chaste woman, Vedavati. She had then cursed him that the cause of his death will be a woman. Remembering this, Ravan goes to Yamlok, the abode of Yama, in the hope that if he keeps Yama under his thumb, he can elude death. However, Goddess of Death, Mrityu Devi appears, and a terrible fight ensues between her and Ravan. Ravan soon gets overpowered. King Dasharath seeing the intelligence and knowledge of Urmila and her cousins, wants Ram's brothers and Sita's sisters to get married along with Ram and Sita. He shares his thoughts with Raja Janak which he agrees. Meanwhile, in Lanka, Mandodari gets worried about the death of Ravan and decides to seek help from a Vishnu devotee. In Mithila, Sita, Urmila, Mandavi and Shrutakirti are married to Ram, Lakshman, Bharat and Shatrughan respectively.

=== Ayodhya Kand ===
Mandodari tells her father Mayasura that Ravan's life is in danger, but he refuses to help as she had left with Ravan against her parents' wishes after forced marriage (Gandharava Vivah) by Ravan. Her mother however, guides her in getting the Amrita. Mandodari goes to Chandralok to get the Amrita. Vibhishana warns Mandodari that Ravan should not find out about his immortality. Mandodari succeeds in her plan of making Ravan immortal. Ram, Lakshman, Bharat, and Shatrughna reach Ayodhya with their brides. Kaushalya, Kaikeyi, and Sumitra welcome them. Later, An Aghori predicts Manthara's future and tells her that she will be thrown out of the palace. Ravan challenges the gods to stop him from conquering the world and confronts his sister Surpanakha for marrying a demon, Vidyutjiva, who is Ravan's enemy. Meanwhile, Bharat and Shatrughan set off to meet Ashwapati, their grandfather.

Dasharath announces Ram to be his heir to the throne. Kaushalya, Sumitra, and Lakshman are ecstatic to know that Ram will be crowned the king of Ayodhya. Manthara is determined to stop Ram from becoming the king. She reminds Kaikeyi about Dasharath's promise to Ashwapati and feeds that Dasharath is conspiring against her. Kaikeyi decides to stop Ram's coronation. Kaikeyi reminds Dasharath about the promises that he had given her. He vows to fulfil two wishes. Kaikeyi tells him to crown Bharat as the king of Ayodhya and send Ram into exile for 14 years. Dasharath hesitantly agrees to crown Bharat the king and send Ram away. Sita urges Ram to take her along with him. Urmila supports Lakshman's decision of accompanying Ram. Ram leaves for Ayodhya in his exile with Sita and Lakshman. Bharat and Shatrughna receive a message asking them to return to Ayodhya. A grieving Dasharatha passes away and Sumitra blames Kaikeyi for his death. When Bharat learns about Kaikeyi's misdeed, he blames her for Dashrath's death. He confronts her for her actions against Ram. Bharat refuses to become the king of Ayodhya. Bharat and Janak decide to bring Ram back to Ayodhya. When Janak reminds her about her love for Ram Kaikeyi requests Bharat to take her along with him to meet Ram.

Ram meets Bharat and is depressed about learning about Dasharath's death. Bharat requests Ram to return to Ayodhya, but he refuses. He tells Janak that he will not return because he wants to fulfil the promise he had made to Dasharath. Bharat asks Ram for his sandals. Bharat places Ram's sandals on the throne. He apologizes to Vashisht, saying he cannot take over Ram's place. Shatrughna confronts Bharata for his decision to become a tapas. Bharat assures Kaushalya that he will stay near Ayodhya. He asks Shatrughna to help him in keeping his promise to Ram to take care of Ayodhya. Lakshman tells Ram and Sita that Goddess Nidradevi has given him a boon to stay awake so that he can serve them. At Lakshman's request, Nidradevi gives his share of sleep to Urmila, and Urmila happily helps him and grants his Nidra until he returns to Ayodhya. Everyone hail Urmila ‘s sacrifice. In vanvas Sita gives a statue of Urmila, that she made to Lakshman to overcome the loneliness and always to help Lakshman find a way in 14 years of vanvas whenever he is sad.

=== Aranya Kand ===
Ram conveys to Sita about his wish to protect the Rishis and people from the demons. They complete ten years of their exile. Sugriva tells Hanuman about Rumā. Hanuman conveys to Rumā that Sugriva loves her and wants to marry her. Bali decides to get Sugriva married to Rumā. Ravan decides to send Khar and Dushan to take control of Dandakaranya. Surpanakha insists Ravan to let her go to Dandakaranya. Malyavan shares his plan to take over Kishkindha with Meghanad. Dundubi comes up with a plan to kill Bali and Sugriva. Dundubi disguises as a buffalo and battles with Bali. Bali kills Dundubi. Rishi Matang curses Bali for breaking his meditation. Ram kills Ravan's soldiers and saves the residents of Panchvati. Surpanakha falls in love with Ram.

Mayavi decides to take Bali to the Rishimukh mountain. Bali follows Mayavi into a cave and asks Sugriva to wait outside until he returns. However, Sugriva is shocked at hearing Bali's screams. He closes the mouth of the cave with a big stone as he assumes that Bali was killed by Mayavi. Sugriva suggests that Tara makes Angad, the king of Kishkindha.

Shurpanakha urges Ram to marry her, but he tells her that he is already married. Shurpanakha plans to prove herself better than Sita. Ram gets irate when Shurpanakha comes to him dressed like Sita. She attacks Sita. Lakshmana cuts Shurpanakha's nose for protecting Sita as she was about to kill her, but Sita unaware of Shurpankha's intentions instead blames him for cutting nose of the woman. Surpanakha asks Khara to kill Ram, Sita, and Lakshman. Khara attacks Ram with his asuras. Ram kills Khara and Dushan. Shurpanakha reaches Lanka, tells everyone about the attack. Surpanakha asks Ravan to avenge her insult by Ram. Ravan decides to punish Ram for his deeds. Sugriva's coronation ceremony begins. Hanuman crowns Sugriva as the king of Kishkindha. A furious Bali returns to Kishkindha and attacks Sugriva for locking him up in the cave. Hanuman rescues Sugriva from Bali and takes Sugriva to Rishimukh mountain. Ravan gets information about Ram and learns that Sita is Ram's weakness. He also remembers the incident at Sita's swayamvar and his oath to take revenge from Janak. Ravan decides to abduct Sita. Ravan tells Marich about Surpanakha's humiliation and seeks his help to avenge her insult.

Marich disguises himself as an injured golden deer to distract Ram from Sita and leads him far into the forest. Sita sees the injured golden deer and tells Ram that she wants to cure it. Ram tells Lakshman to stay with Sita while he goes to bring the deer. Meanwhile, Hanuman tells Sugriva that Bali has made Rumā his slave. Hanuman tells Sugriva that he will seek help from the other kings to defeat Bali. However, Ram is shocked when Marich calls out to Sita and Lakshman in his voice. Sita is worried about hearing Ram's cries. Marich apologizes to Ram for his misdeed and dies. Sita orders Lakshman to go but Lakshman refuses knowing that deer is magical. But he hesitantly agrees to go when Sita panics and frantically orders him to go aid Ram. He draws a powerful line Lakshmana Rekha which no immoral creature could cross to protect Sita, but tells Sita not to cross it. When Lakshman leaves, Ravan disguised as a sage tricks Sita to cross the Lakshmana Rekha. Sita tries to run, but he ends up abducting her.

On the way to Lanka, Jatayu tries to save Sita, but Ravan cuts off his wings. Sita then throws her jewellery to the ground hoping Ram will see it as a sign. Ravan kidnaps Sita and takes her to Lanka. Ravan's mother Kaikesi, tells him that he should marry Sita as she is a powerful woman instead of treating her badly. Sita finds her place in the garden of Lanka (Ashoka Vatika) and refuses Ravan's proposal saying that she is always going to love Ram and never be unfaithful to him. She decides to wait for him until her death. Meanwhile, Ram learns about the abduction from the bird Jatayu.

=== Kishkindha Kand ===
Hanuman meets Ram and becomes his devotee. He narrates about Sugriva's problem and his brother Bali misbehaving with his wife, Rumā. Ram challenges to kill Bali and liberate him from all his sins. He directs Sugriv to go on a duel with Bali so that he can kill him during that time. Everything happens accordingly and Ram kills Bali. Sugriva is crowned the king of Kishkindha. Bali's son Angad begins to follow Ram and joins the monkey army. Sugriva and Ram instruct Hanuman to enquire about Sita and her well-being. Ram also gives him his ring as a mark of his well-being to Sita.

=== Sundar Kand ===
Hanuman goes to Lanka and meets Sita. He also gives her Ram's ring. Sita gets shocked when she learns about Ram's condition. Ravan instructs his second son Akshayakumara to attack Hanuman. Mandodari knows about Hanuman's strength and fears because she doesn't want to lose her son. Instead, she wants Akshayakumara to leave Lanka. Akshay heads his father's words and attempts to attack Hanuman. Hanuman, with his wit and power, kills Akshayakumara. Soldiers bring his dead body to the king. All get shocked to see this, and Mandodari gets shattered to see her deceased son. Hanuman is brought to the king by the soldiers, and Ravan decides to punish Hanuman by sentencing him to death. But Vibhishan advises to mutilate one of his body parts rather than killing him. Ravan chooses to burn his tail. All the men and Meghnadh burn the rear. Sita learns about this and prays to Agni Dev to produce coolness instead of a burning sensation to Hanuman. Hanuman burns the whole Lanka with his tail. Sita gives her chudamani (head ornament) to Hanuman as a mark of her presence in Lanka. Hanuman leaves Lanka.

Vibhishan pleads with his brother Ravan to free Sita and handover her to Ram as she is someone's wife. Ravan, considering him as his enemy throws him out of Lanka. Hanuman reaches Ram and tells about Sita being in Ashok Vatika. Ram vows to free Sita from Ravan's captivity and kill him.

Ram, Lakshman, and the whole monkey army decide to construct a sea bridge (Ram Setu) across the ocean to Lanka. Two other monkeys, Nal and Neel, join the monkey army. Ram prays to Lord Shiva before constructing the bridge. Ram, along with the monkey army, constructs the bridge and goes to Lanka. Vibhishan joins Ram's army and tells them that he will help them in the war.

=== Yuddh Kand ===
Ram, Lakshman, and the monkey army reach Lanka, and Ram declares war against Ravan. Ravan plans troops to attack the monkey army at midnight. Ravan's army attacks the monkey army as per plan. Meghnadh plans to kill Ram and Lakshman. With his illusion, Meghnadh shoots an invisible venomous arrow at Ram and Lakshman. They become unconscious. Ravan becomes happy that his son Meghnadh has killed Ram and Lakshman. Lord Shiva then decides to request the King of birds, Lord Garuda to save Ram and Lakshman, which he does.

Ram then kills many more warriors in the war, including Ravan's younger brother Kumbhakarna. This gravely angers Ravan, and he decides to kill Ram as soon as possible. After that, he sends Meghanad to fight Ram-Lakshman. He goes to the battlefield and fights Lakshman. He uses Shakti on Lakshman, and Lakshman goes into an unconscious state. Trijata tells Ram's army the address of Sushena. Hanuman flies to the house of Sushena. Sushena tells the only option to save Lakshman is Sanjeevani Booti. Hanuman flies to the Himalayas to get Sanjeevani. After he returns, a Lepa of Sanjeevani is drunk by Lakshman, which brings him back to life. While in Lanka, Meghnad does the Devi Yagya to get Divine Weapons and Divine Horsecart. The disadvantage of this Yagya was that if the Yagya is stopped in between, then the person doing it gets killed. The vanar sena disturbs Meghnad. Lakshman chops off the head of Meghanad. After this, Raavan enters the battlefield. Ram gets hurt, and Ravana nearly strangles him to death. Each time he attacks Ravan, he gets back. Vibhishana tells the secret of Ravan to Ram that he had nectar in his navel. Ram then shots the arrows at Ravan's navel. Ravan dies. But after he dies, his mother creates his elder and more powerful brother, Sahastra Ravan. Now Ram thinks that since he was able to kill Ravan once he can kill him once again. He starts shooting arrows at Sahastra Ravan. But nothing happens to Sahastra Ravan, he single-handedly defeats them all. Kaikesi informs this to Sita and she rushes to the battlefield. In a fit of rage, she transforms herself into Kali and kills Sahastra Ravan. Later, Lakshman talks to Urmila's idol that was given by Sita and thanks her for her support and love and for granting his Nidra, he tells her that Ram and sita meeting time has come and their reunion is also not away. Later, Ram questions Sita's purity and then Sita does the Fire test and proves her purity. Later, they all return to the kingdom and reunite with all others. Sumitra sees Lakshman desire to meet Urmila in the eyes and tells him to go and reunite with her and also wake her from the Nidra as she will only open her eyes when Lakshman is in front of her.

=== Uttar Kand ===
Lakshman meets Sleeping Urmila and tells he could have not served Ram without her help and support, and asks her to open her eyes when she doesn't Lakshman becomes worried, Vashistha tells him to pray to Nidra Devi, Lakshman prays to her and takes his Nidra back. Afterwards, Urmila wakes from her Nidra and they reunite, starting a new life together. After being crowned king, Ram spends life pleasantly with Sita. Sita gets pregnant with Ram's child. Rumors about Sita's purity spread in Ayodhya. Ram banishes Sita to the forest due to rumors. Lakshman leaves her in the forest, blaming himself. Urmila and her sisters are angry with Ram and confront him. Sage Valmiki shelters Sita in his hermitage, where she gives birth to Ram's twins, Lava and Kusha. Sita raises them incognito as Vanadevi. After 12 years, Ram performs the Ashwamedha Yagna, and the twins capture the horse, leading to battle. After defeating Lakshman, Bharata, Shatrughna, and Hanuman, the twins are about to fight Ram, but Sita stops them, asking Ram to forgive. She reveals Ram is their father, and they realize their mother is Sita. Urmila and her cousins reunite with Sita. Ram asks Ayodhya if he can bring Sita back. He brings Sita back, where Lava and Kusha unite with Ram. Sita refuses to return to Ayodhya, citing society's doubts about her character. To prove her purity, Sita returns to her mother, Bhumi, confronting Ram. Ram is heartbroken and returns to Ayodhya, promoting women's rights for Sita. Years later, Ram crowns Lava and Kusha as Kings of Ayodhya, and Rajmatas pass away. Urmila dreams of Lakshman's death and discusses it with him; he reassures her. Urmila consults sage Vashistha, who warns her. She prays to Mahadev for Lakshman's safety. Kal visits Ram as a sage, urging capital punishment for interference. Lakshman guards the door and stops Rishi Durvasa, who threatens to curse the kingdom. To save the kingdom, Lakshman enters the chamber, leading Ram to order him to leave. Urmila is heartbroken as her dream comes true; she faints when Lakshman refuses to take her. Lakshman, regretting not loving Urmila enough, meets Ram for the last time. He goes to the forest and kills himself. The next day, Ram and his brothers drown in the Sarayu River. At the river's bottom, Ram turns to Vishnu. Bharat transforms into the conch shell Panchajanya, and Shatrughna into Vishnu's Sudarshan Chakra. They return to Vishnu, where Lakshmi tells Vishnu it took long to join her and suggests returning to their abode. Urmila and her cousins grieve for Lakshman, Bharat, Shatrughna, and Ram. Hanuman tells Ayodhya's populace that Ram and Sita live in all, showing they were always in his heart.

== Cast ==
=== Main ===
- Madirakshi Mundle as Sita / Lakshmi / Bhargavi: Goddess Lakshmi's incarnation, Janak and Sunaina's adopted daughter, Bhumi Devi's daughter; Ram's wife, Luv and Kush's mother
  - Ananya Agarwal as young Sita
- Ashish Sharma as Rama / Vishnu: God Vishnu's 7th incarnation; King Dasharatha and Kaushalya's son; Sita's husband, Luv and Kush's father
  - Vedant Sawant as teenage Ram
  - Yash Mistry as young Ram
- Karan Suchak as Lakshmana: God Sheshanaga's incarnation; Dasharatha and Sumitra's first son, Shatrughna's elder twin brother, Urmila ‘s husband, Angad and Chandraketu's father
- Karthik Jayaram as Ravana: A rakshas, Lanka's King, Vishrava and Kaikesi's son, Kumbhakarna, Surpanakha, Ahiravana and Vibhishan's elder brother, Mandodari's first husband, Dhanyamalini and Chitrangada's husband, Meghnad, Atikay, Akshay Kumar, Narantak, Devantak, Trishira's father
- Danish Akhtar Saifi as Hanuman: Lord Shiva's 11th incarnation; Ram's devotee; The son of Vayu dev and Anjana's son, Kesari's adoptive son, Subarchala, Makardhvaja's father

=== Recurring ===
- Dalip Tahil as Dasharatha: Avatar of Swayambhuva Manu, King Aja and Queen Indumati's son; Kaushalya, Kaikeyi and Sumitra's husband;Shanta, Ram, Bharat, Laxman and Shatrughan's father.
- Snigdha Akolkar as Kaushalya: Dasharath's first wife and Mother of Bhagwan Shri Ram and Shanta.
- Grusha Kapoor as Kaikeyi: Dasharath's second wife and Mother of Bharata.
- Sampada Vaze as Sumitra: Dasharath's third wife; Mother of Lakshmana and Shatrughna.
- Yukti Kapoor as Urmila: incarnation of Nagalakshmi, Janak and Sunaina's biological daughter; Sita's younger adoptive sister, Lakshman's wife;Angad and Chandraketu's mother
- Sujay Reu as Bharata: God Vishnu's conch (shankh) incarnation; Dasharath and Kaikeyi's son; Ram, Lakshman, Shatrughan's brother; Mandvi's husband; Taksh and Pushkal's father
- Pratham Kunwar as Shatrughan: God Vishnu's Sudarshan chakra incarnation; Dasharath and Sumitra's son; Ram, Lakshman, Bharat's brother; Shrutakirti's husband; Taksh and Pushkal's father; Subahu and Shatrughati's father
- Prithvi Hatte as Mandavi: Goddess Lakshmi's conch (shankh) incarnation; Kushadhwaja and Chandrabhaga's elder daughter; Shrutakirti' elder sister, Bharat's wife, Taksh and Pushkal's mother
- Tanvi Madhyan as Shrutakirti: Goddess Lakshmi's lotus incarnation; Sita and Urmila's cousin; Mandavi's younger sister; Kushadhwaja and Chandrabhaga's younger daughter; Shatrughan's wife, Subahu and Shatrughati's mother
- Zalak Desai as Shanta: Dasharatha and Kaushalya's daughter; Varshini and Romapada's adoptive daughter;Ram's elder sister;Chaturang and Vabhru's elder adoptive sister,Rishyasringa's wife
- Sanyogeeta Bhave as Manthara: Kaikeyi's wet nurse and maid from kekeya, Incarnation of Alakshmi and Dundubhi, reincarnation of the maid of princess Haimavati

==== Mithila ====
- Bijay Anand as Janak: King of Mithila, Hrasvaroma and Kaikasi's elder son, Sunayana's husband, Urmila's father, Sita's adoptive father
- Bhargavi Chirmule as Sunayana: Queen of Mithila,Shesha and Naglakshmi' elder daughter, Sulochana and Shalivahan's elder sister, Janak's wife, Urmila's mother, Sita's adoptive mother
- Hemant Choudhary as Kushadhwaja: Hrasvaroma and Kaikasi's younger son, Janak's younger brother, Chandrabhaga' husband, Mandavi and Shrutakirti's father; King of Sankasya.
- Anjali Rana as Chandrabhaga: Kushadhwaja's wife; Mandavi and Shrutakirti's mother, Queen of Sankasya
- Romanch Mehta as Shatananda: Ahilya and Sage Gautam's son, Satyadhriti's father
- Richa Soni as Gargi: Sage Garga's elder daughter;Gaargya's younger and Shini and Gargayan's elder sister
- Jitendra Trehan as Yagyavalkya: Katyayani and Maitreyi's husband
- Shweta Rastogi as Ahilya: Brahma's mind born daughter, Rishi Gautam's first wife, Shatananda, Saradwan, Chirakari and Anjali's mother, Bali and Sugriva's foster mother

==== Lanka ====
- Surendra Pal as Vishrava: Pulastya and Manini's elder son,Agastya's elder brother;Devvarnini, Kaikashi, Raka and Pushpotkata's husband;Kubera, Shaastra Ravana, Ravana, Kumbhakaran, Vibhishan, Khar, Dushan, and Surpanakha, and kumbinasi's father.
- Pratima Kazmi as Kaikesi: Sumali and Ketumati's third daughter;Prahasta, Akampan, Vikat, Kalikamukh, Dhumraksh, Danda, Suparsva, Sanahradi, prabhash, Bhashkarna, Raka and Pushpotkata'syounger and Kumbhanasi's eldersister;Vishrava's second and favourite wife; Shaastra Ravana, Ravana, Kumbhakaran, Vibhishan, and Surpanakha's mother.
- Piyali Munshi as Mandodari: apsara madhura's incarnation;Ravan's first wife; Maya demon and Apsara Hema's daughter, Mayavi, Dundubhi and Vyomasur's younger sister, Meghanaad, Atikay and Akshayakumara's mother, Mahiravan's adoptive mother
- Ankur Nayyar as Meghanad: half incarnation of Shiva;Ravan and Mandodari's first son;Atikay and Akshay Kumar's elder brother; Sulochana's husband;Kuveni and Saman's father
- Vividha Kirti as Sulochana: Meghanand's wife, Sheshnag and Nagalakshmi's younger daughter;Sunayna younger twin sister, Shalivahan's elder sister;Kuveni and Saman's mother
- Nikhilesh Rathore as Akshayakumara: Ravan and Mandodari's third son.
- Unknown as Prahasta-Sumali and Ketumati's eldest son, Kaikasi's eldest brother, Jambumali's father, Ravan's Commander
- Gaurav Walia as Kumbhakarna/Vijay: Vishrava and Kaikesi's second son; Shaastra Ravana, Ravana, Vibhishan and Surpanakha brother;vajrajwala, karkati, taritmala and aswani's husband;kumbha, nikumbha, bheemasur, mulakasur and aswanikumbha's father
- Sailesh Gulabani as Vibhishan: Vishrava and Kaikesi's third son; Shaastra Ravana, Ravana, Kumbhakaran and Surpanakha's brother; King of Lanka. Sarama's husband, Mandodari's second husband, Taranisen, Sananda, Trijata, Neel and Analte's father
- Sara Khan/Bhagyashree Mote as Surpanakha: Vishrava and Kaikesi's daughter; Shaastra Ravana Vidyutjihba's widow, Ravana, Kumbhakaran and Vibhishan's sister, Shambhri's mother
- Unknown as Kalanemi: He was sent by Indrajit to stop Hanuman from going to the Himalayas but he gets killed by Hanuman; Maricha's son.
- Zahida Parveen as Trijata: Sita's caretaker in Lanka
- Sumit Kaul as Akampana: Ravana's spy and maternal uncle; reason for Sita's abduction.
- Pankaj Berry/Sanjay Swaraj as Mayasura: Hema's husband, Mandodari's father.
- Ajay Purkar as Malyavan: Ravan's maternal grandfather.
- Devish Ahuja as Tarini: Ravan's son, a devotee of Lord Vishnu.

=== Others ===
- Manish Wadhwa as Vishwamitra
- Chetanya Adib as Jatayu: He sacrifices his life by protecting Sita from Ravana.
- Sudesh Berry as Parashurama: Lord Vishnu's 6th incarnation.
- Priyanka Pal as Vedavati: Goddess Lakshmi's incarnation; daughter of King Kushadhwaj. she reincarnated as Sita.
- Zubair Ali as Vali: Sugriva's brother; Tara's husband; Angad's father./Sugriva-Vali's brother; Ruma's husband.
- Jividha Sharma as Tara: Vali's wife; Angad's mother.
- Deblina Chatterjee as Rumā: Sugriva's wife.
- Manav Sharma as Angad: Tara and Vali's son; Sugriva and Ruma's adopted son.
- Vishal Bhardwaj as Nalakūvara/Nalakuber, who curses Ravana that if touches a woman against her wishes, his head would burst into a hundred pieces. Due to this curse, Ravana was never able to come in contact with Sita despite his ill intentions.
- Kashmera Shah as Tataka: a female asura killed by Ram.
- Shakti Singh as Valmiki
- Rohit Bakshi as Shiva: Parvati's consort; Kartikey, Ganesha and Ashokasundari's father.
- Rimpi Das as Parvati: Shiva's consort; Kartikey, Ganesha and Ashokasundari's mother.
- Anuya Bhagwat as Mrityudevi.
- Sangeeta Khanayat as Ganga.
- Jiya Chauhan as Nidra devi.
- Raj Logani as Indra: Ravana and Indrajit defeated him and he helped Rama against Ravana.
- Radha Krishna Dutt as Brahma: Ravana asked boon to him that only human can kill him.
- Shyam Mashalkar / Shailesh Datar as Narad: Brahma's son.
- Vinod Kapoor as Sumantra
- Rahul Rana as Subahu
- Abhijit Lahiri as Bharadwaj
- Arup Pal as Ashwapati
- Amit Dhawan as Yudhajeet
- Abhilash Chaudhary as Ketu
- Sanjeev Siddharth as Yama

== Special episodes ==
- Aa Rahe Hain Shree Ram - aired on 14 December 2015

It shows the Birthday of Rama after 8 years leap. From this episode Ashish Sharma plays the role of adult Rama, before this role of teenage Rama was played by Vedant Sawant.

- Swayamvar Saptaah - aired from 18 to 23 January 2016

It shows the Swayamvar of Sita organized by her father Janak. Sita will marry with the man who could string the Shiv Dhanush by lifting it as easily as she did. Rama, on the day of Swayamvar, lifted the bow effortlessly and won Sita's hand in marriage.

- Vivah Utsav - aired from 3 to 13 February 2016

Vivah Utsav of Rama and Sita Starts with Haldi Ceremony. On the occasion of Deep Milan Utasv King Dasharatha fixed the marriage of his other Children with the other daughters of Janak and Kushadhwaja. Bharata weds with Mandavi, Lakshmana weds with Urmila and Shatrughan weds with Shrutakirti. This Vivah Utsav ends with the Vidai Ceremony.

== Production ==
=== Casting ===
Simone Singh was initially roped for the role of Kaikayi but was replaced by Khalida Turi. As the makers felt her too young for the role, they replaced her with Grusha Kapoor.

Ashish Sharma was roped for playing Lord Ram and Madirakshi Mundle was roped for Lady Sita who makes her Hindi television debut. Dalip Tahil was roped for playing Ram's father Dasharath. Bijay Anand was cast as Sita's father Janak who returned to acting after 17 years. Rohit Bakshi was cast for playing Lord Shiva. Karan Suchak and Yukti Kapoor were roped for playing Lord Lakshman and Lady Urmila, Lakshman's wife. Wrestler Danish Akhtar was selected for portraying Hanuman thereby making his acting debut. Chetanya Adib was cast for playing Jatayu's character in April 2016. Sailesh Gulabani was cast for playing Vibhishan. Karthik Jayaram was cast for the role of Ravan, making his Hindi television debut. Sara Afreen Khan was cast for playing Ravana's sister Surpanaka who was later replaced by Bhagyashree Mote. Pratima Kazmi was cast as Ravana's mother Kaikesi. In August 2016, Shakti Singh was cast for playing Valmiki. Uzair Basar and Harsha Sharma were cast to play Luv and Kush in September 2016.

=== Release ===
On 2 January 2016, a team of Star Plus flagged off Shiv Dhanush Yatra, which was inaugurated with an Aarthi on the banks of Ganga in Kashi Vishwanath Temple following a Pooja at Somnath temple in Gujarat, by traveling across 107 cities across Gujarat, Punjab and Uttar Pradesh in 15 days to promote the series.

Speaking about the series, creative head of Star Plus Anirudh Pathak stated, "We have seen different dimensions of Ramayan. So what was pending? Then we thought that we haven't heard the Ramayan from Sita's viewpoint. She's not different from Ram. She was with him always and that was her choice. She was a warrior herself and her story was out of compassion and not a compulsion. This Ramayan is racy, technologically upgraded as regards shoots, camera, sets, locations, etc. If we aren't giving them the flavor of 'Game of Thrones' then there was no point in telling the Ramayan once again."

The series was supposed to end in mid October 2016 but received an extension for a month and ended in November 2016.

=== Filming ===
The cast of the series was unveiled at Ramoji Film City, Hyderabad where the series was mainly filmed. Besides, it was also filmed in various locations including Sri Lanka, Lepakshi (Andhra Pradesh), Bhuj (Gujarat), Darjeeling (West Bengal), Kerala, Madhya Pradesh, and Mumbai.

For the wedding sequence of Ram and Sita, 100 kg of flowers were used. Owing to rain while shooting outdoors for the war sequence between Lord Ram and Ravana, eight copies of the same costume were arranged by the makers to tackle it.

In April 2016, the vanvas sequence was shot in Virar, Maharashtra. In May 2016, while shooting for Sita's kidnapping by Ravan sequence, Madirakshi Mundle got injured in an accident and the shoot was held for a while.

== Critical reception ==
The Quint reviewed, "Siya Ke Raam presents a refreshing change. The grand scale of production and the elaborate costumes add the required epic-ness to the story. Impressive sets evoke awe, wonder, and magic. The show's cast is pretty bang on too with Bijay Anand, Dalip Tahil, Grusha Kapoor, and many other talented actors putting together an entertaining drama. The show's attention to detail, research, and authenticity are also very impressive."

Comparing the role of some actors and actresses who played in earlier versions Ramayan 1987, Ramayan 2008 Hindustan Times stated, "Ashish Sharma was a muscular, powerful Ram with a forever Pokerface. But he did look a lot more like a prince than Arun Govil. The makers of Siya Ke Ram has always maintained that the show is a retelling of the epic from Sita's perspective which Madirakshi a lot more room to impress. She is not mute or opinionless like Deepika Chiklis’ Sita. Madirakshi was also more expressive without going overboard. Karthik is big too but in a 'gym-jock' way rather than a 'fat-demon' way. Karthik's accent was not popular among the audience as many Hindi words would give him trouble. They did get a voice actor to dub over his words but it was all too evident on screen and a tad irritating. Danish was huge but inspired! And the make up department did him dirty. The great acting from even the secondary characters like Kaikeyi (Grusha Kapoor) and Dasharath (Dalip Tahil) was also enough to keep viewers hooked." However, reviewing the sets, costumes, and CGI, they said, "In Siya Ke Ram, the computer graphics helped give an appearance of grandeur. The attention to detail and the costumes were beautiful as well. The lamps behind the actors, the divan, the beautiful artwork, and the coloring sheets. Everything was just right for a king's room. Sure the CGI did go a bit awry from time to time."

== Awards & Nominations ==
Year	Award	Category	Nominee	Result	ref
2016	Star Parivaar Awards	Favourite Beta	Ashish Sharma	Won	
2016	Star Parivaar Awards	Favourite Digital Sadasya - Male	Ashish Sharma	Nominated	
2016	Star Parivaar Awards	Favourite Pati	Ashish Sharma	Nominated	
2016	Star Parivaar Awards	Favourite Jodi	Ashish Sharma; Madirakshi Mundle	Nominated	
2016	Star Parivaar Awards	Favourite International Jodi	Ashish Sharma; Madirakshi Mundle	Nominated	
2016	Star Parivaar Awards	Favourite Naya Sadasya - Female	Madirakshi Mundle	Nominated	
2016	Star Parivaar Awards	Favourite Beti	Madirakshi Mundle	Nominated	
2016	Star Parivaar Awards	Favourite Patni	Madirakshi Mundle	Nominated	
2016	Star Parivaar Awards	Favourite Nayi Soch Kirdaar	Madirakshi Mundle	Nominated	
2016	Indian Television Academy Awards	Best Historical Serial	Nikhil Sinha	Won	
2016	Indian Television Academy Awards	Best Actor	Ashish Sharma	Nominated	
2016	Indian Television Academy Awards	Best Costumes	Nikhat Neerusha	Won	
2016	Abby Awards	Best Use of Special Events & Stunts/Live Advertising	Siya Ke Ram - Dhanush Yatra	Won - Silver Medal	
