= Shanta =

Wife of Rishyasringa and sister of Rama in epic Ramayana

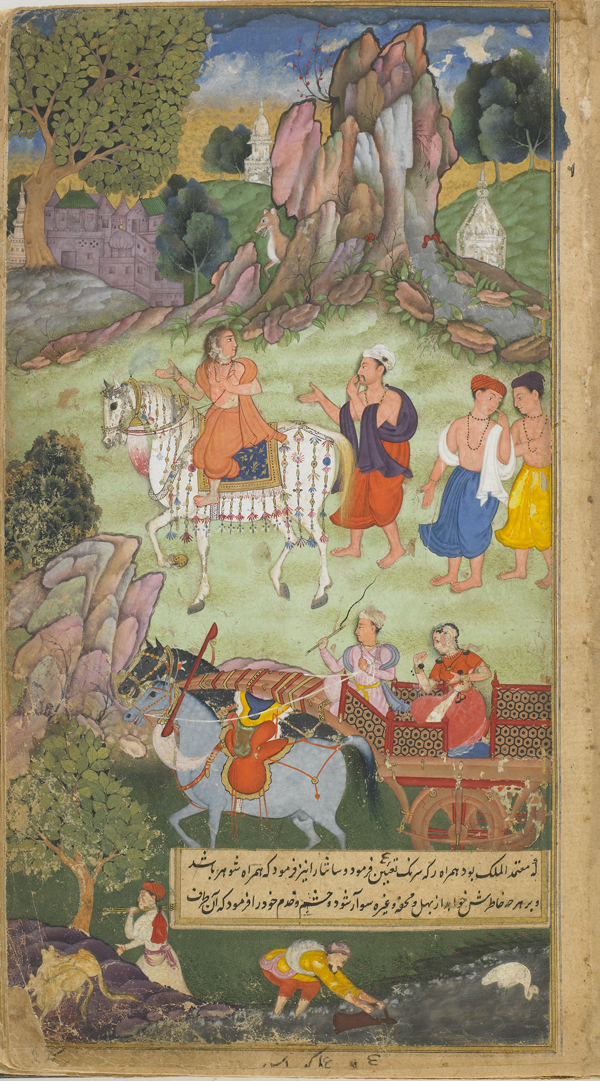
- Rishyasringa travels to Ayodhya with Shanta

Genealogy
- Parents: Romapada (adoptive father); Vershini (adoptive mother) Dasharatha (Biological father) Kaushalya (Biological Mother)
- Siblings: Rama; Chaturanga (adoptive brother)
- Spouse: Rishyasringa

Shanta (Sanskrit: शांता), is the princess of Anga in the Hindu epic Ramayana. She is the wife of Rishyasringa. In northern recensions of the epic and later Indian literature, she is regarded as a daughter of King Dasharatha and Queen Kausalya, who was later adopted by King Romapada and Queen Vershini.

== Legend ==
Shanta was educated in the Vedas, arts, craft as well as in warfare, and was considered to have been very beautiful. One day, while her father, the king Romapada, was busy in conversation with Shanta, a brahmin came to ask for help in cultivation in the days of the monsoon. Romapada did not pay attention to the brahmin's plight. This irritated and enraged the brahmin, who left the kingdom. Indra, the god of rain, was unable to bear the insult to his devotee, so there was little rainfall during the monsoon season resulting in drought in the kingdom. Meanwhile, Dasharatha wanted a son to continue his legacy and enrich his royal dynasty. It was advised that the troubles of both kingdoms could only be alleviated by yajnas performed by a brahmin with powers that come from the observance of perfect chastity and that the only such person was Rishyasringa.

Rishyasringa had been raised by Vibhandaka, isolated from society without knowledge of women. He had to be brought to the city and be persuaded to carry out the necessary yajna ceremonies. Despite their fear of the power and anger of Vibhandaka, both kings send young women to introduce the boy to the normal society, then Shanta fulfills this task and Rishyasringa marries Shanta, he then agrees to perform yajna for Anga, during the recitation of it, it rained heavily, the public rejoiced and there were festivals in Anga.

Rishyasringa also performed a Putra Kameshthi yajna for Dasharatha to beget progeny, and as the consequence of the said yajna Rama, Bharata, and the twins Lakshmana and Shatrughna were born.

== Worship ==
In the Kullu district of Himachal Pradesh and in the Sringeri town of Karnataka, there are temples dedicated to Shanta and her husband Rishyasringa.

== In popular culture ==
Zalak Desai portrayed Shanta in the 2015 series Siya Ke Ram. Parvathy Jayaram played Shanta in the critically acclaimed Malayalam movie Vaishali. Actress Riya Kapoor will portrayed Shanta in Namit Malhotra 's Ramayana
