= Vershini =

Wife of Romapada in Ramayana

- Ramayana character

In-universe information
- Family: Kaushalya (younger sister), Rama (nephew), Sukaushala (father), Amritaprabha (mother) Dasharath (brother-in-law, spouse of Kaushalya)
- Spouse: Romapada
- Children: Shanta (niece later adoptive daughter); Chaturanga (son)

Vershini (Sanskrit: वर्षिनी) was the queen of Anga, wife of King Romapada and the adoptive mother of Shanta in the Hindu epic Ramayana.

== Legend ==
Vershini and Kausalya were daughters of Kaushala king Sukaushala and queen Amritaprabha. Vershini was married to Romapada, the king of Anga, and Kausalya to Dasharatha, the king of Ayodhya. Romapada was a good friend of Dasharatha as both of them were educated at the ashram of the sage Vasistha. Shanta was born to Dashratha and Kausalya. Shanta was later given to Romapada as his foster child by Dashratha when Vershini said about having children and Dashratha promised to give Shanta to adoption as he wedded Kaikeyi and Sumitra in hopes of having more children. Later, Shanta was wedded to sage Rishyasringa. The story goes on a sage, a devotee of Lord Indra visited the Anga court to meet king Romapada but he played with Shanta at the time and the sage feeling neglected left the court, Seeing his devotee neglected Indra cursed Anga to not have rain and the officials in Anga suggested the King to bring Rishyashringa to perform a yagna to have rain; So Shanta married Rishyashringa brought him to Anga performed the Yagna and the rain in Anga became seasonal as usual. While, In Kosala King Dashratha didn't have sons, So Rishyashringa and Shanta were called to perform the Putrakameshti Yagna and a heavenly being came out of the fire to give Payasam (milk delicacy) and it was evenly shared between Kaushalya and Kaikeyi (in the ratio of ½) Then Kaushalya and Kaikeyi shared it with Sumitra (in the ratio of ¼) Leading to the birth of Shanta's half brothers Rama, Bharata, Lakshmana and Shatrughana.Hence, Shanta was married to Rishyashringa, He was given position of a prince (or prince consort) in the Anga Kingdom.
