= Mata Kaushalya Temple =

Hindu temple dedicated to Mata Kaushalya

- Location in Chhattisgarh

Religion
- Affiliation: Hinduism
- District: Raipur
- Deity: Kausalya

Location
- Location: Raipur
- State: Chhattisgarh
- Country: India
- Interactive map of Mata Kaushalya Temple
- Coordinates: 21.3194°N 81.8131°E

Architecture
- Completed: 8 October 2021 (Rejuvenated)
- Elevation: 278 m (912 ft)

Mata Kaushalya temple is a Hindu temple, dedicated to Mata Kaushalya, mother of Lord Ram. It is the only temple in the world dedicated to Mata Kaushalya. It is located at Chandkhuri village around 27 km away from Raipur in Chhattisgarh.

In 2020, the Chief minister of Chhattisgarh, Shri Bhupesh Baghel, laid the foundation stone for the expansion of the temple few days before the foundation stone of the Ram temple in Ayodhya was laid. He said that the ancient Mata Kaushalya temple will be given a magnificent look while keeping its original form intact.

== Location ==
The temple is located around 22 km to 27 km away from the Capital City Raipur in Chhattisgarh State. The temple is located in the middle of a lake surrounded by the Chadkhuri village. The temple is accessed by walking on the bridge called Hanuman Pul which has a statue of Hanuman over it.

== Description ==
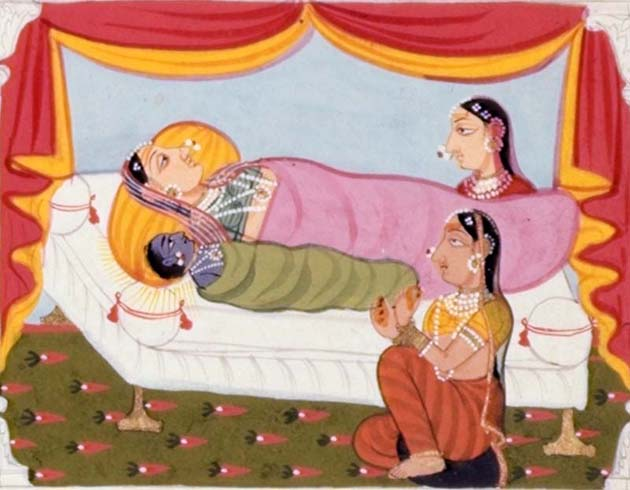
Painting depicting the birth of Lord Rama

The temple has the idol of Mata Kaushalya holding Lord Shri Ram in her lap. The temple is believed to have been constructed in the 8th century. The temple had been damaged and rebuilt many times. In 1973, the temple was renovated.

== Ram Van Gaman Path ==
The connection between Chhattisgarh and Lord Ram is deeply-rooted as it is the birthplace of Mata Kaushalya. Chhattisgarh is the maternal house of Lord Ram. It is said that, during his exile (Vanavas), he spent a great amount of time in the woods of this province which was earlier known as Dandakaranya.

Owing to the great mythological significance of the state, Current Chief Minister, Bhupesh Baghel initiated the exemplary project, 'Ram Van Gaman Path'. This is a tourist circuit that aims to connect all the places where Shri Ram halted during his exile. Mata Kaushalya Temple in Chandkhuri is the first place where the development work was initiated in October 2021. This temple is being restored while keeping its originality intact.

== See also ==
- Janaki Mandir
