= Romapada =

King of Anga in Ramayana

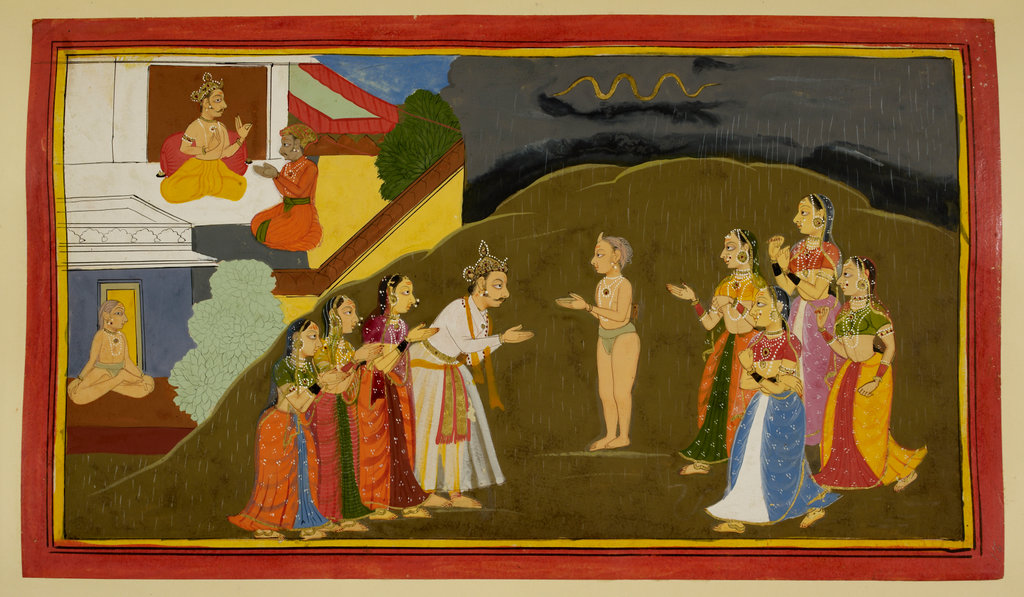
- Romapada welcomes Sage Rishyasringa to his kingdom

Information
- Family: King Vidarbha (father); King Dharmaratha (adoptive-father)
- Spouse: Vershini
- Children: Shanta (adopted daughter); Chaturanga (son)

Romapada (Sanskrit: रोमपद), also known Chitraratha and Lomapada, was a king of Anga, and the adoptive father of Shanta in the Hindu epic Ramayana.

== Legend ==
=== Early life ===
Romapada was the youngest son of the Yadava king Vidarbha. Vidarbha had many sons, but his friend King Dharmaratha of Anga was heirless. Thus, Dharmaratha adopted Romapada. When Dharmaratha grew old, he made Romapada the ruler of Anga.

=== Meeting with Rishyasringa ===
After Dharmaratha retired to the forest, Romapada became the King of Anga. He married Vershini, who was the elder sister of Kausalya (mother of Rama). Kausalya's husband - King Dasharatha of Ayodhya was Romapada's childhood friend. Romapada and Varshini did not have any issue; Dasharatha promised them his first child. A daughter Shanta was born to Dasharatha and Kausalya. Shanta was then adopted by the childless Romapada.

Once, a Brahmin named Shuvateertha came to Romapada to ask for help, but the king called him back in the evening. When he visited in the evening, the king was busy talking with Shanta, and ignored Shuvateertha. The Brahmin returned, disappointed. The god of the rain and the king of heaven, Indra was enraged with the behaviour of the king. Thus, Anga received little rain during monsoons.

Severe drought occurred in the kingdom of Anga and on discussing with the known saints, the king realised the prevalent situation could be salvaged only if sage Rishyashringa, the son of Vibhandaka would visit his country and bless it with the power of his meditation and austerity.

The king thought of various means to bring the sage to his country, and he suddenly got the idea that the seer, who had grown aloof from the world and the material pleasure, could only be lured by the charm and beauty of women. Thus, he sent beautiful courtesans dressed in attractive clothing and decorated with a pleasant smell in order to lure the seer. A courtesan named Vaishali was successful in bringing him to Anga, where he was given grand welcome.

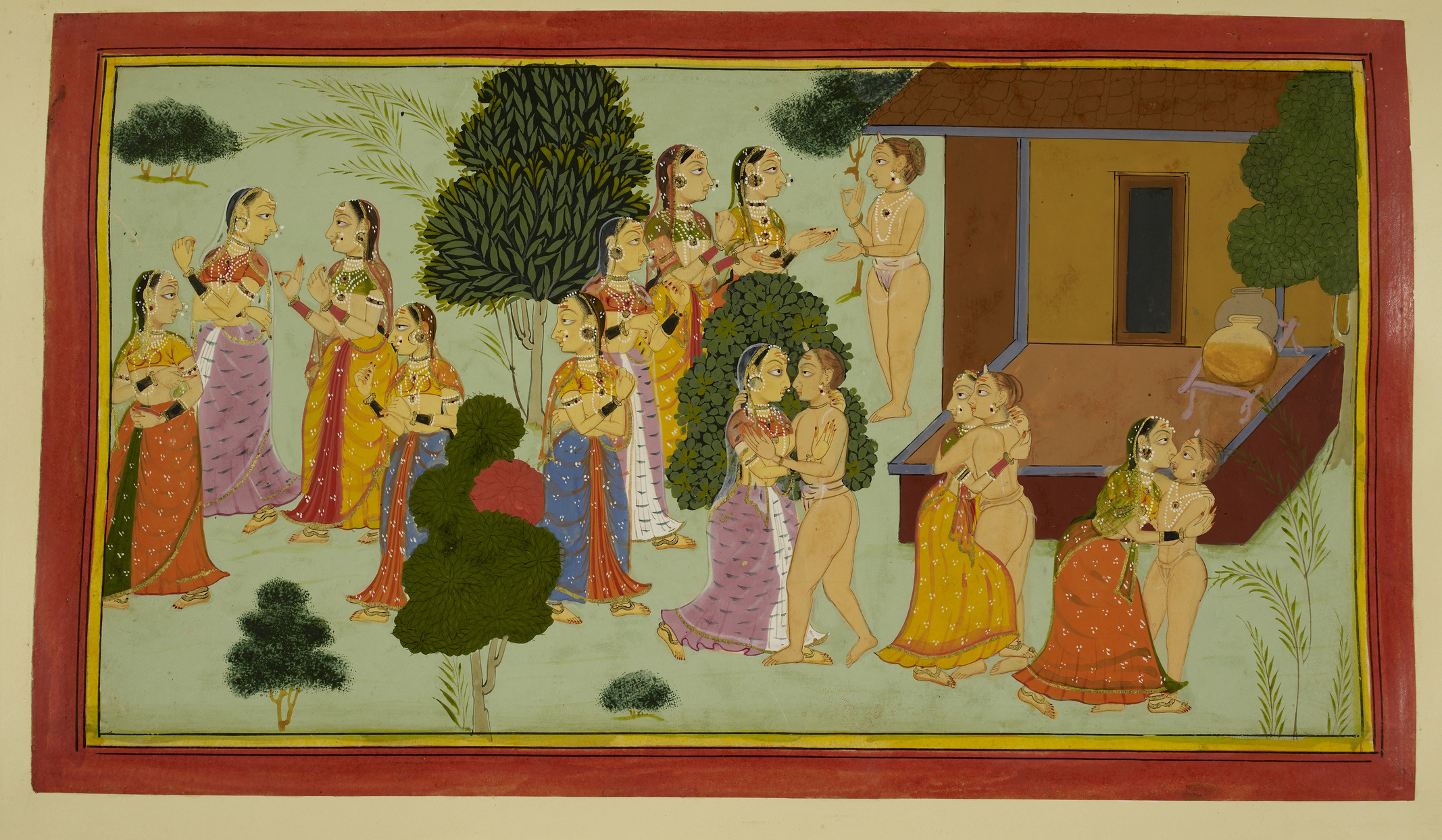
The courtesans tempt Rishyasringa - Ramayana, Bala Kanda .

The king had earlier adopted the daughter of his friend Dasharatha called Shanta, who was an elder sister of Rama to Kausalya. After the seer performed the sacrifice, he was given an opportunity to choose a bride for him from among the daughters of all the known officers, ministers, and subordinate rulers present there. The young seer chose Shanta, the adopted daughter of Romapada. Hence, she was married to him, and the sage was given position of a prince in the Anga Kingdom.

In the Mahabharata, Adhiratha, the chief charioteer of King Dhritarashtra and adoptive-father of Karna, is said to be Romapada's descendant.

== See also ==
- Sagara
- Pratardana
- Guha
