= Kausalya =

Queen of Kosala and mother of Rama in epic Ramayana

- Queen consort of Kosala; Queen mother of Kosala
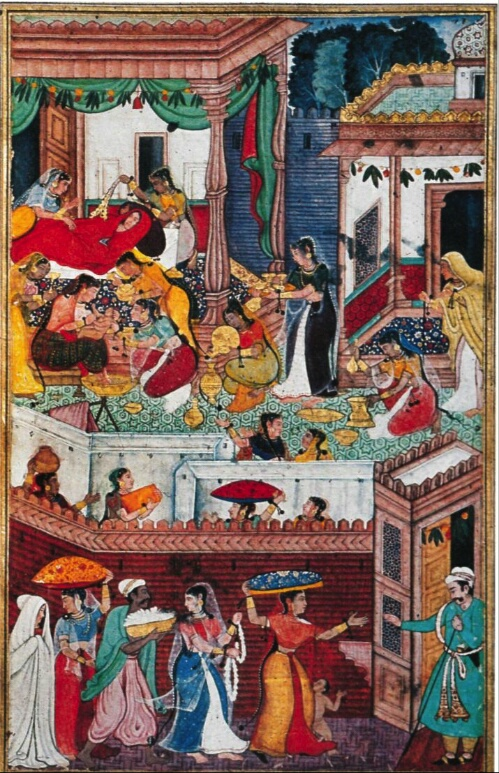
- Kausalya gives birth to Rama

Maharani of Kosala
- Predecessor: Indumati
- Successor: Sita
- Spouse: Dasharatha
- Issue: Rama
- House: Ayodhya
- Dynasty: Raghuvamsha-Suryavamsha (by marriage)
- Father: Sukaushala
- Mother: Amritaprabha
- Religion: Hindu

Kausalya (Sanskrit: कौसल्या, IAST: Kausalyā) is a queen of Kosala in the Hindu epic Ramayana. She is the first senior queen consort of Dasharatha, who ruled Kosala from its capital Ayodhya. She is the mother of Rama, the male protagonist of the epic. She is a secondary character in the Ramayana, so only specific aspects of her life are described in detail.

== Legend ==
=== Birth ===
Valmiki, the author of the Ramayana, does not mention the names of Kausalya's parents, but in the chapter titled, Ayodhyakanda she is described as Kosalendraduhitā (i.e., daughter of the king of Kosala). Kosala was a region of ancient India, which had Ayodhya as its capital. The Padma Purana also explains that Kausalya was the daughter of a Kosalan prince.

Later texts name her as the daughter of the King Sukaushala and Queen Amritaprabha of Dakshina Kosala. At her traditionally ascribed birthplace, there exists a temple dedicated to her called the Mata Kaushalya Temple, which is perhaps among the few temples dedicated to her.

=== Marriage and Rama's birth ===
In the Balakanda chapter of the Ramayana, Kausalya first appears. She performs the Putra kāmeshti yajna alongside Dasharatha and his two other wives in hopes of blessings for sons (they had a daughter, Shanta, who was given up for adoption). At this sacrifice led by Rishyasringa, a divine being presents Dasharatha with a golden bowl filled with a payasam (a milk delicacy) prepared by the gods. Dasharatha offers half of this divine food to Kausalya, a quarter to Sumitra (i.e., literally 'half of that which remained'), an eighth to Kaikeyi (i.e., again, 'half of that which remained'), and then, upon reflection, gives the final eighth to Sumitra again. Consequently, Kausalya gives birth to the prince Rama, Kaikeyi to Bharata and Sumitra to royal twins, Lakshmana and Satrughna. Rama is well known in Hinduism as an avatar of Vishnu and is the central character of the Ramayana.

In the Ayodhyakanda chapter of the Ramayana, Kausalya is described as “the best of women” due to her pious nature.

=== Rama's exile and return ===
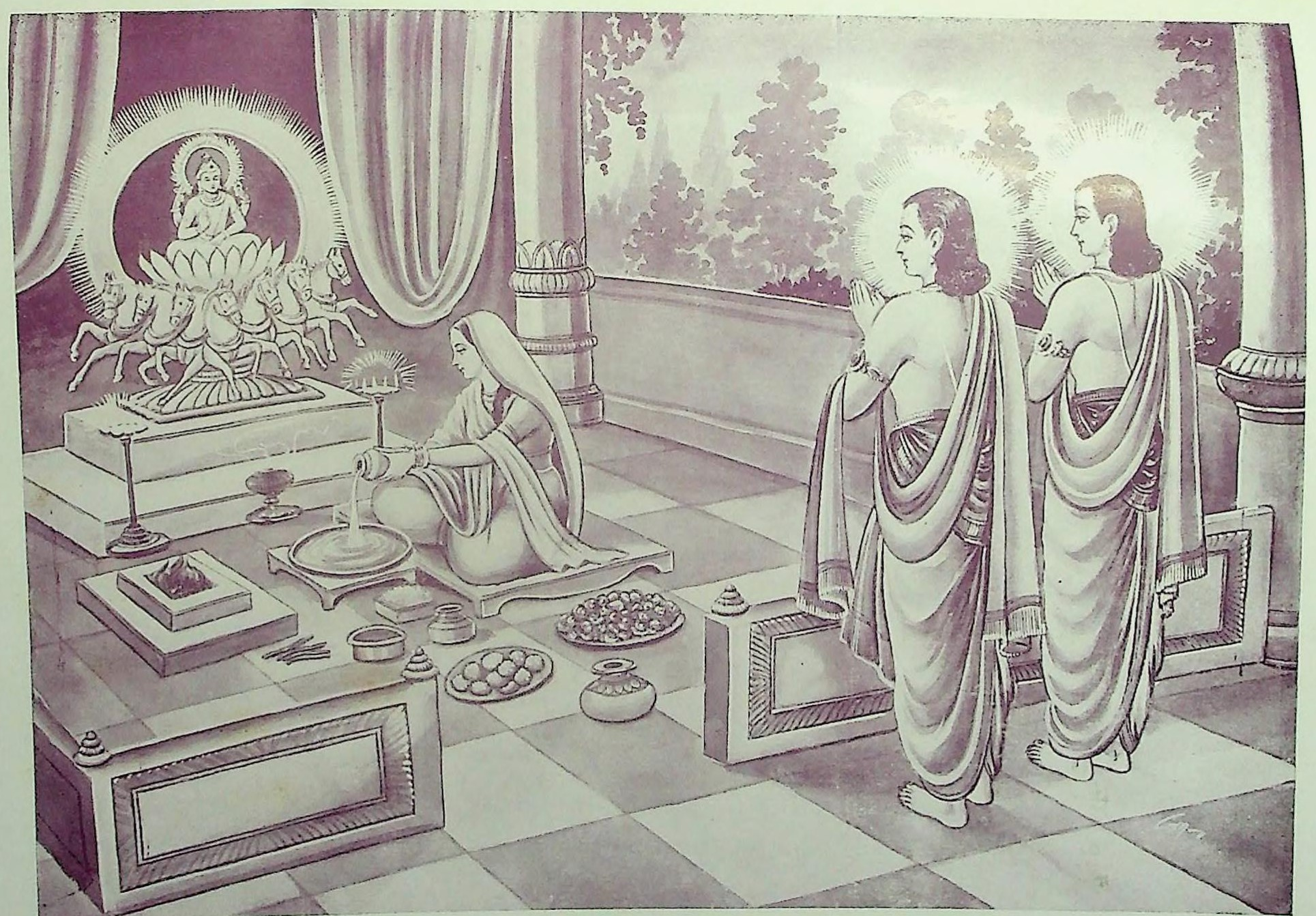
Rama meets his mother Kausalya while she performs pooja

Kaikeyi's plan to have Rama exiled is instigated by her belief that Kausalya would become the Queen Mother if Rama is made the Crown Prince, which would make Kausalya a more powerful queen than her and remove Bharata's lineage from the throne. Such beliefs are planted in her mind by her servant, Manthara, who had raised her. Kaikeyi then manipulates Dasharatha into exiling Rama for fourteen years and crowning Bharata as the Crown Prince.

On the day Rama was to be made Crown Prince, Rama himself is the one who informs Kausalya that Dasharatha has instead exiled him to the forest. Kausalya with Lakshmana both attempt to convince Rama not to go to the forest. When her efforts are void, Kausalya pleas to Rama to take her with him to the forest, but Rama reminds her of her duty to her family and kingdom at the palace, while his duty is in following the orders of his father. When Rama sets forth to begin his exile from Ayodhya, Dasharatha, and Kausalya hurry after his chariot until Rama, unable to bear the sight, tells his charioteer, Sumantra, to quicken his pace so that they would be left behind.

After Rama's departure, both Dasharatha and Kausalya are left to grieve and reflect on how their past led to the loss of their son, until soon after, Dasharatha passes away. Kausalya accuses her husband Dashratha of having destroyed Rama when banishing him to exile. By Kausalya's harsh criticism, Dasharatha is reminded of an incident in his youth where he was cursed. The curse foreshadowed Rama's exile. Kausalya also reflects and explains that in a prior life, she disallowed calves to drink from their mothers’ udders, assumingly leading to her separation with Rama in this life (Ayodhyakanda 38.16-17).

Fourteen years later, upon her son's accession to the throne, Kausalya becomes widely honoured as the queen mother. Queen Kausalya is considered to be the incarnation of Dhara (Brahmani), wife of Dronavasu. She received a boon from Vishnu, who promised her that he would be born as her son in the Treta Yuga.

== Assessment ==
Kausalya's character, like many others in the Ramayana, depicts the tale of human emotion and self-recognition. She struggles with the tragedies she faces with her husband remarrying, her son sent to exile and her husband dying, but she is well described in the scripture for her religious austerity despite this. This concept of characteristic development contrasts with characters such as Rama, Lakshmana, Sita, and Bharata who are depicted as moral epitomes without internal struggles. Robert P. Goldman believes these characters were written as “monovalent paradigms of conduct” by the poet, displaying unnatural superiority.

Kausalya is seen throughout the entire Ramayana as a symbol for religious devotion and piety. Kausalya also plays a role in the Ramayana as an example of faithfulness in marriage.

== Worship ==
The Mata Kaushalya Temple is located in Chandkhuri in the Raipur District of Chhattisgarh. The temple has been revived and inaugurated by the Chief Minister of Chhattisgarh, Bhupesh Baghel, and other dignitaries, under the 'Ram Van Gaman Path' project in October 2021.

== In popular culture ==
=== Films ===
- Manisha Chudamani portrayed Kausalya in the 1997 Telugu film Ramayanam.
- Jayshree Gadkar portrayed Kausalya in the 1997 Hindi film Lav Kush.
- K. R. Vijaya portrayed Kausalya in the 2011 Telugu film Sri Rama Rajyam.

=== Television ===
- Jayshree Gadkar portrayed Kausalya in the 1987 series Ramayan and the 1988 series Luv Kush.
- Alka Kubal portrayed Kausalya in the 2000 series Vishnu Puran
- Beena Banerjee portrayed Kausalya in the 2002 series Ramayan.
- Rajni Chandra portrayed Kausalya in the 2008 series Ramayan.
- Gauri Singh portrayed Kausalya in the 2011 series Devon Ke Dev...Mahadev.
- Neelima Parandekar portrayed Kausalya in the 2012 series Ramayan.
- Samragyi Nema portrayed Kausalya in the 2015 series Sankat Mochan Mahabali Hanumaan.
- Snigdha Akolkar portrayed Kausalya in the 2015 series Siya Ke Ram.
- Jaswinder Gardener portrayed Kausalya in the 2018 series Ram Siya Ke Luv Kush.
- Suparna Marwah portrayed Kausalya in the 2021 web series Ramyug.
- Anandi Tripathi portrayed Kausalya in the 2024 series Shrimad Ramayan.
- Sugandha Srivastava portrayed Kausalya in 2024 DD National series Kakabhushundi Ramayan- Anasuni Kathayein.

==== YouTube ====
- Preeti Sachdeva portrayed Kausalya in 2024 YouTube series Valmiki Ramayan.

== See also ==
- Dasharatha
- Kaikeyi
- Sumitra
- Versini
