= Dasharatha =

King of Kosala and father of Rama in the epic Ramayana

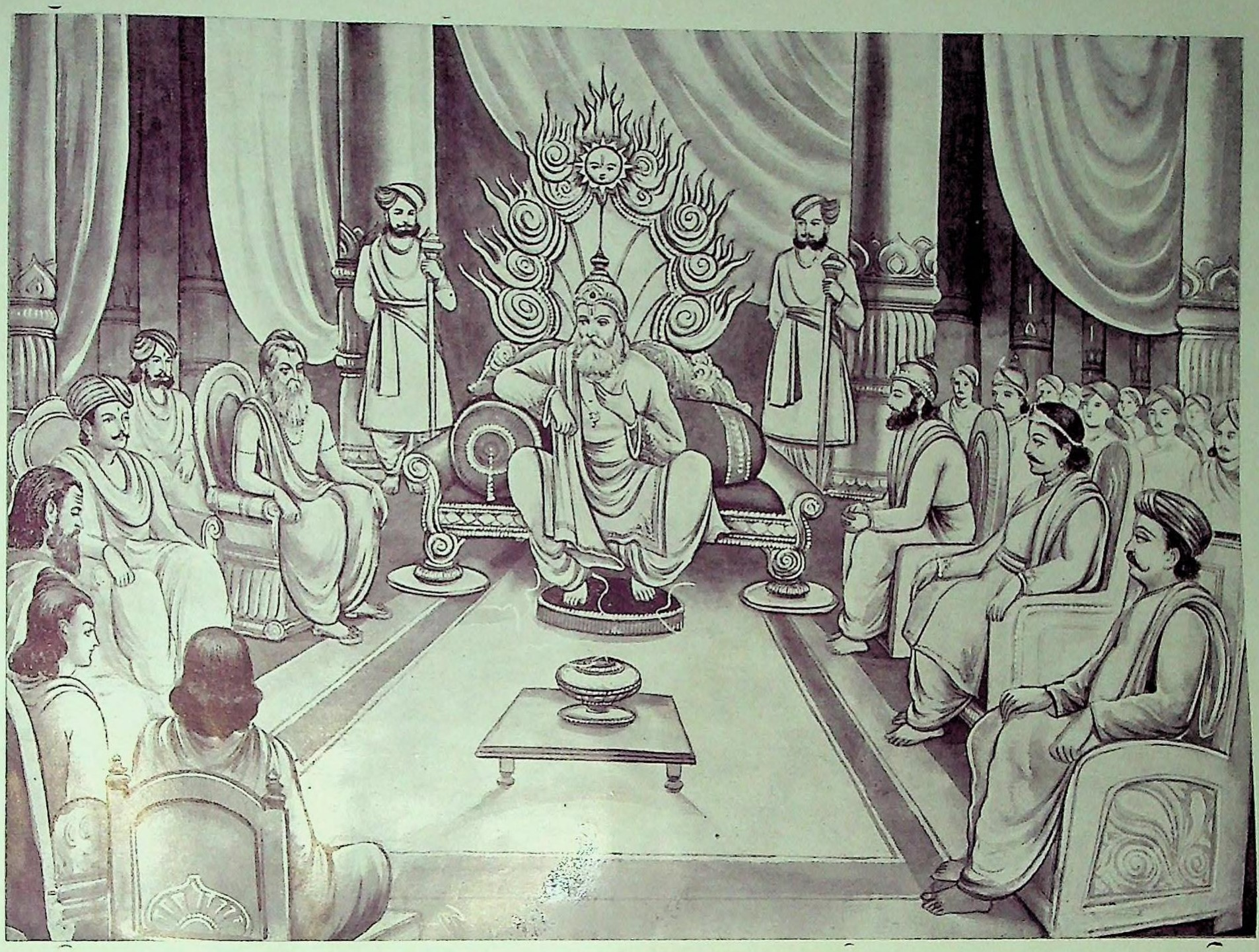
- King Dasharatha sitting on his throne

Maharaja of Kosala
- Predecessor: Aja
- Successor: Rama
- Born: Nemi; Ayodhya, Kosala, Bharatavarsha (modern-day Uttar Pradesh, India)
- Died: Ayodhya, Kosala, Bharatavarsha (modern-day Uttar Pradesh, India)
- Spouse: Kaikeyi; Kaushalya; Sumitra; 350 junior wives
- Issue: Rama (son); Bharata (son); Lakshmana (son); Shatrughna (son); Shanta (daughter according to few recensions)
- Dynasty: Suryavamsha
- Father: Aja
- Mother: Indumati

Dasharatha (Sanskrit: दशरथ, IAST: Daśaratha; born Nemi) was the king of Kosala, with its capital at Ayodhya, in the Hindu epic Ramayana. Dasharatha married Kaushalya, Sumitra and Kaikeyi. He was the father of Rama, the protagonist of the epic Ramayana, Bharata, Lakshmana, and Shatrughna. Dasharatha also finds mention in the Vishnu Purana.

== History ==
=== Early life and marriage ===
King Dasharatha was believed to be an incarnation of Manu, the son of Brahma.

Dasharatha was born as the son of King Aja of Kosala and Indumati of Vidarbha. He was originally named Nemi, but he acquired the moniker Dasharatha ('ten chariots') as his chariot could move in all ten directions, fly, and return to earth, and he could fight with ease in all of these directions.

Dasharatha became the ruler of Kosala after the death of his father. He was a great warrior who subjugated many of the neighbouring kingdoms with his prowess and slew many asuras in battle.

According to the Bala Kāṇḍa of the Ramayana Sarg15 Sloka number 20 (धर्मज्ञस्य वदान्यस्य महर्षिसमतेजसः ।

अस्य भार्यासु तिसृषु श्रीह्रीकीर्त्युपमासु च)

King has three queens: Kausalya was his chief queen, Sumitra was his second queen Kaikeyi was his third queen. Kausalya hailed from the kingdom of Dakshina Kosala, Sumitra from Kashi, and Kaikeyi from the Kekeya Kingdom.

=== Yajñas to beget sons ===
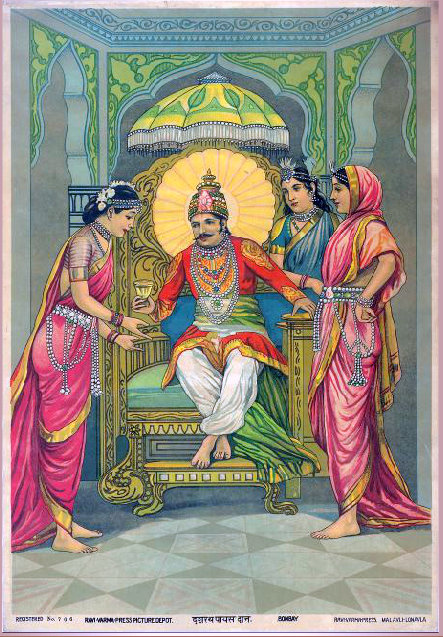
Dasharatha gives payasa to his wives

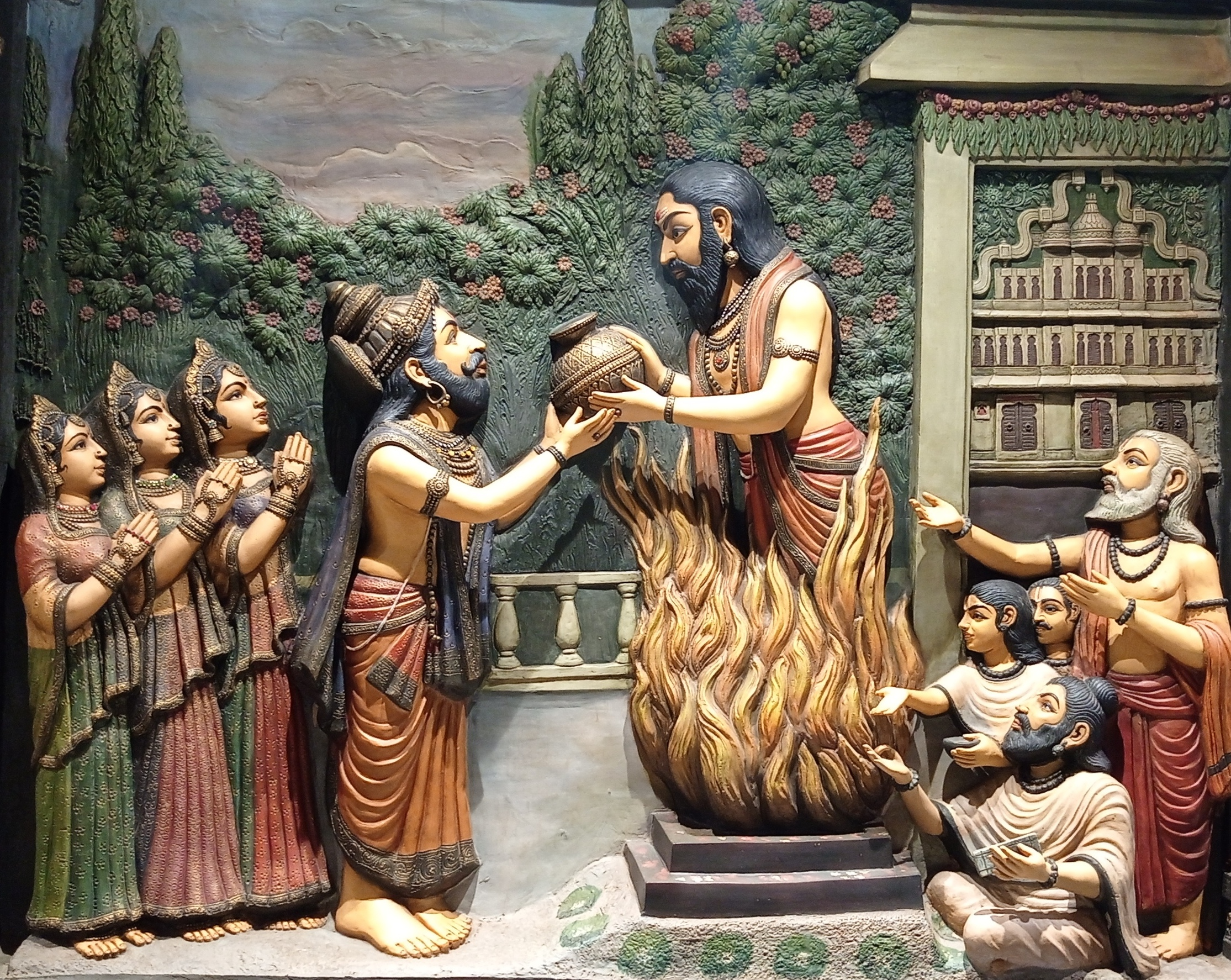
The Fire Figure giving Payasa to Dasharatha

Dasharatha ruled over Ayodhyā, but he lacked a son to carry on his dynasty. He decided to perform a Puthrakamesti yagnam in order to beget a son. His counsellor and charioteer, Sumantra, told him of a prophecy that by bringing the sage Rishyasringa to Ayodhyā, he would beget sons. To fulfil the prophecy, Dasharatha traveled to Anga, where king Romapada's daughter Shanta was married to Rishyasringa. Bringing Rishyasringa to Kosala, he instructed the Brahmins to perform the Puthrakamesti yagnam. After the Puthrakamesti yagnam was properly performed, a Putrīyā Iṣṭi was performed for the attainment of sons.

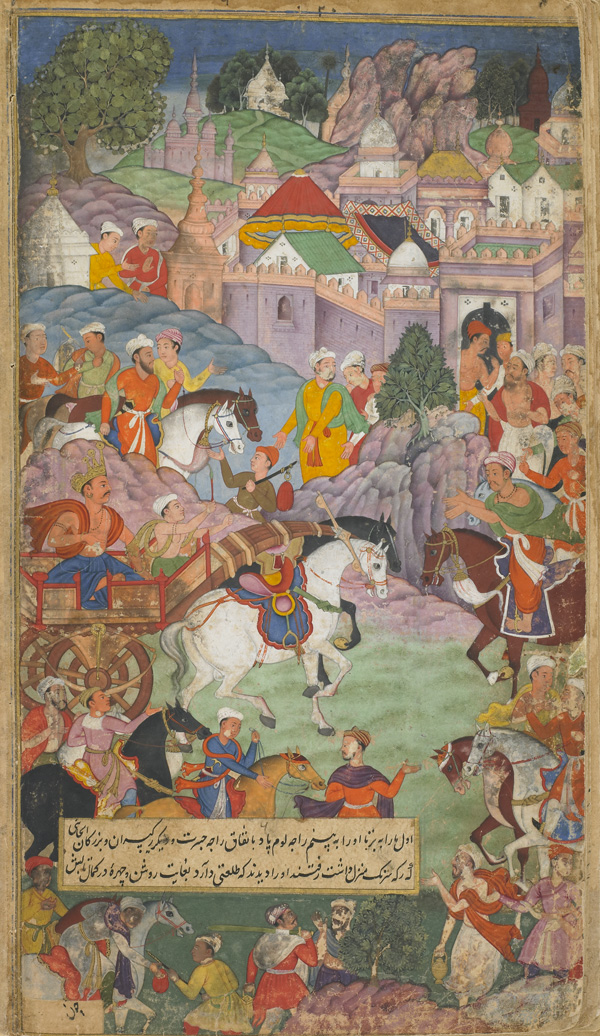
Dasharatha going to Anga to invite Rishyashringa,his son-in-law

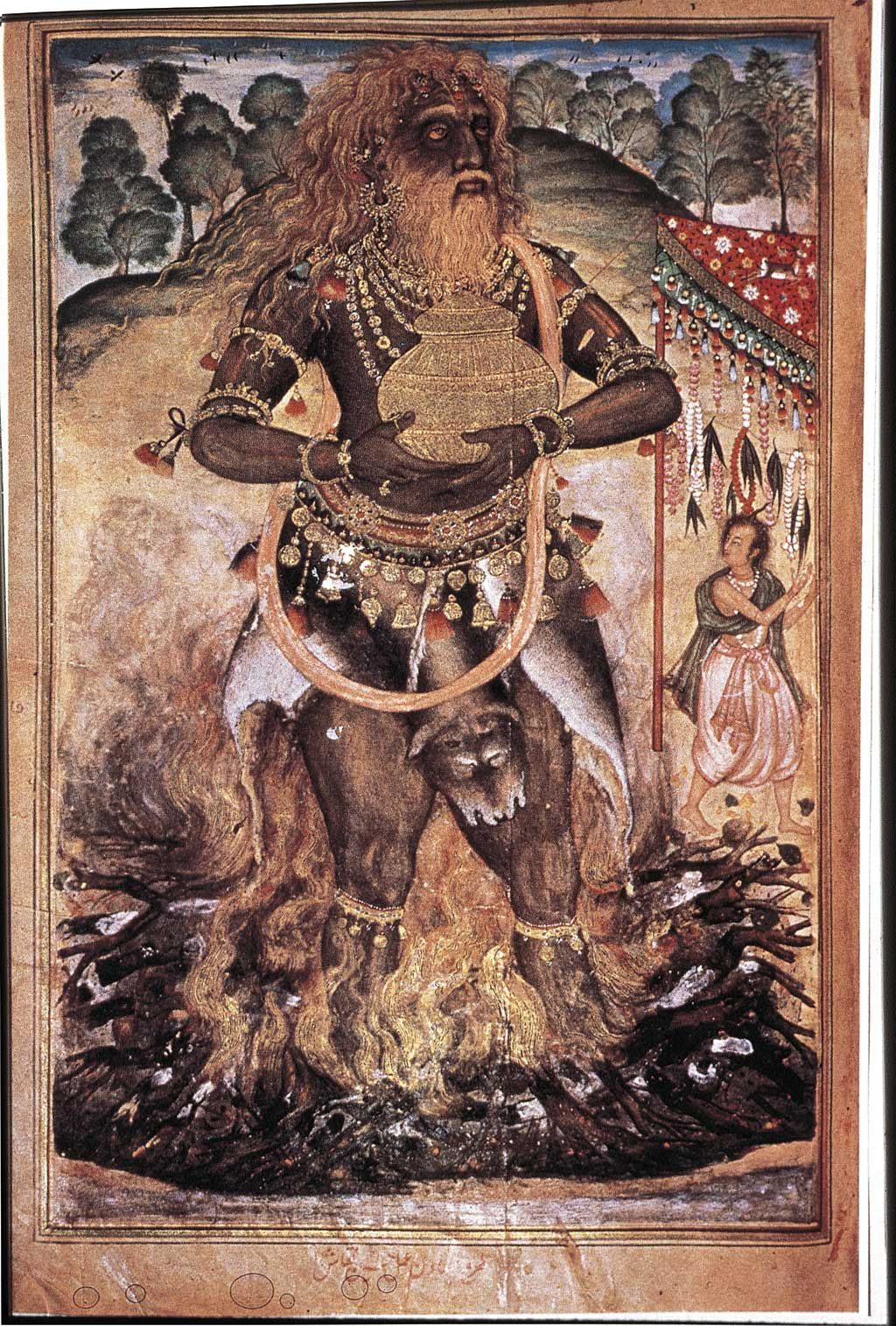
Agnipuruṣa rises from the sacred fire with divine boon

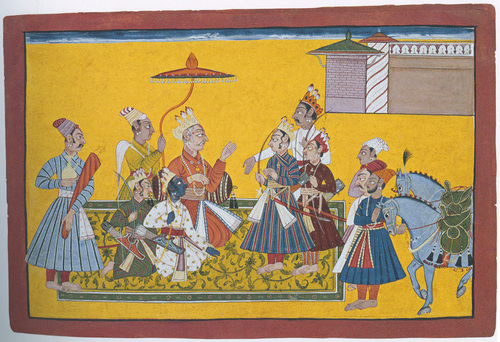
Dasharatha with his four sons

During its performance, a figure emerged from the fire carrying a vessel of celestial porridge. Dasharatha offers half of this divine food to Kausalya, a quarter to Sumitra (i.e., literally 'half of that which remained'), an eighth to Kaikeyi (i.e., again, 'half of that which remained'), and then, upon reflection, gives the final eighth to Sumitra again. Kausalya gives birth to the prince Rama and Kaikeyi to Bharata. and Sumitra became the mother of Lakshmana and Shatrughna.

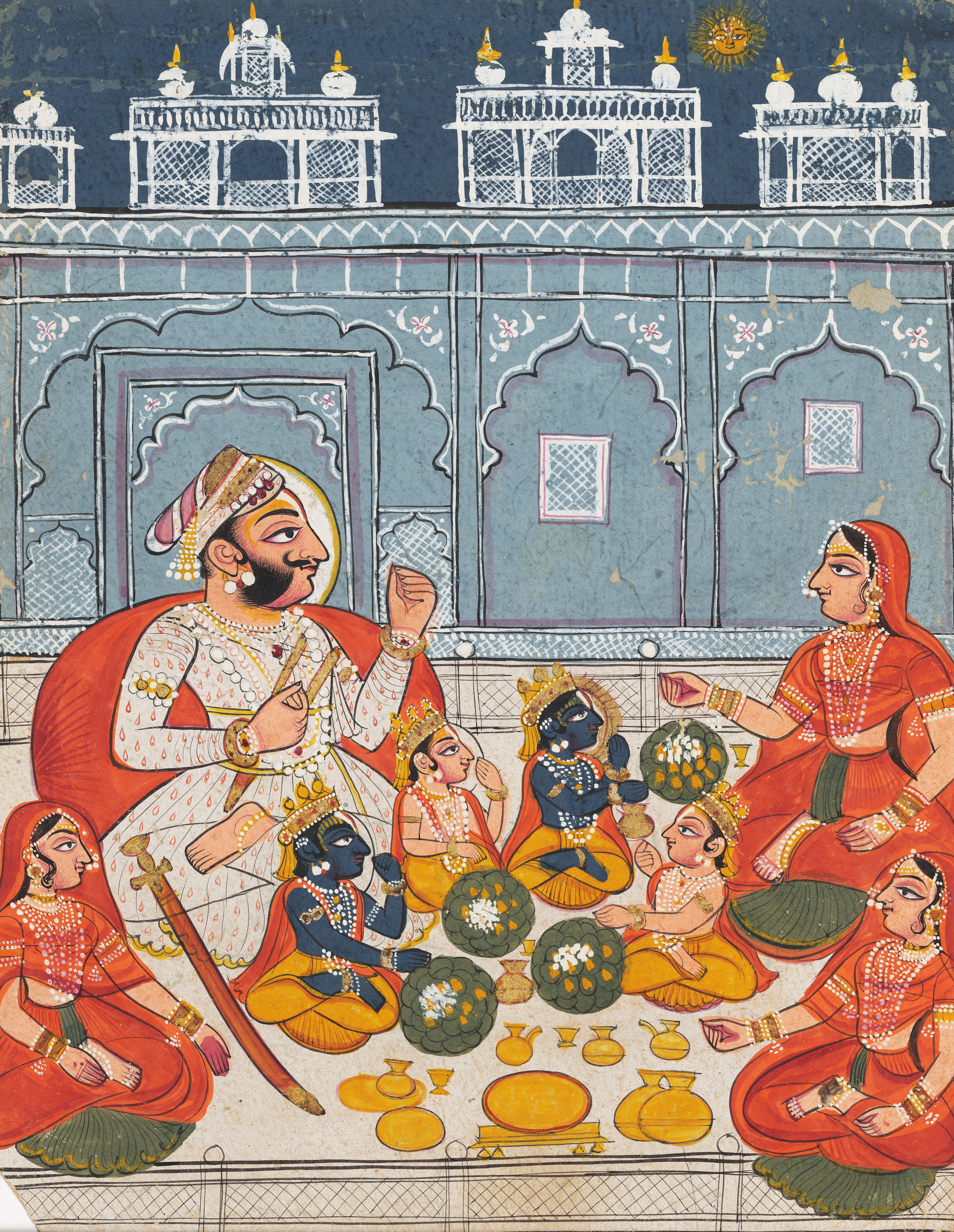
Rama and his brothers in the company of Raja Dashratha and his three queens.

=== Kaikeyi's boons and Rama's exile ===
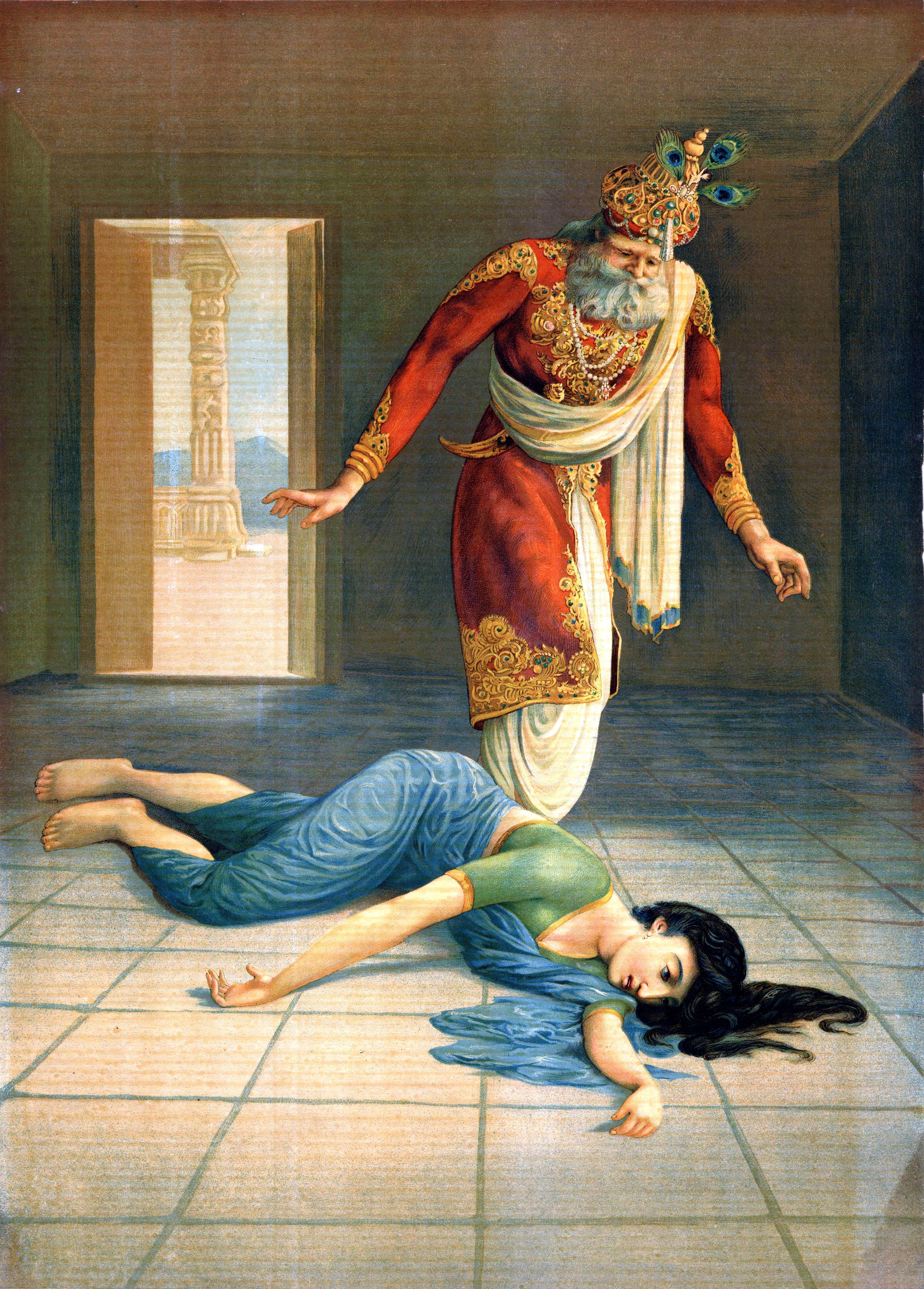
Kaikeyi asks her boons from Dasharatha

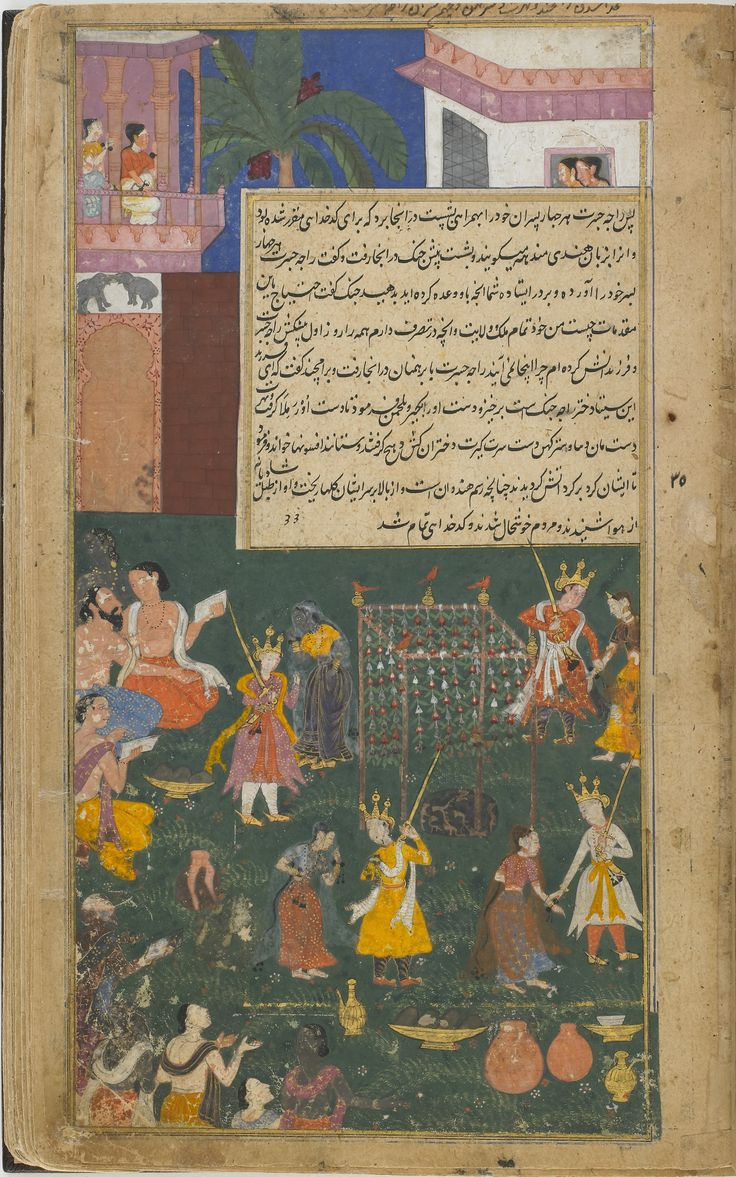
The four sons of Dasharatha circumambulate the altar during their marriage rites

In a battle between the devas and the asuras, Dasharatha rode to Devaloka, accompanied by Kaikeyi, to help Indra fight against the asuras. The devas were at a disadvantage due to the sorcery employed by Shambara and his army of asuras. Dasharatha, riding a chariot, faced the asuras in ten directions at the same time. In this battle, his chariot had to be turned to every direction in a swift manner. During the battle, the bolt of one of the wheels slipped out, and the wheel was about to disengage when Kaikeyi inserted her thumb in the hole of the bolt, and kept the chariot steady. When the king learnt of this, he was pleased, and offered her two boons. The queen said that she would ask for those two boons in the future, as she wished for nothing right then and there.

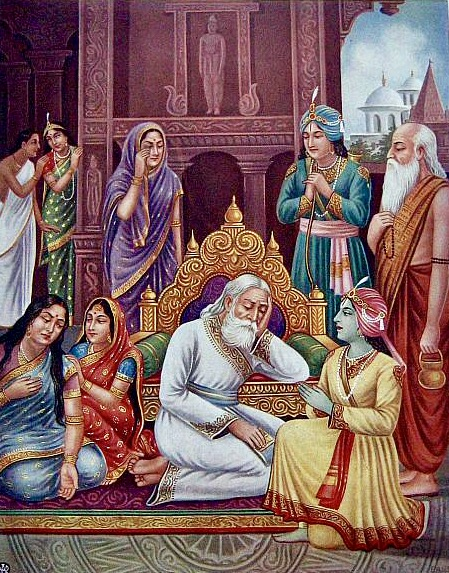
King Dasharatha grieving the exile of his son Rama

Manthara, Kaikeyi's maid, feared that Kaikeyi would lose her status as chief queen at court if Rama ascended the throne, as Kausalya would thus become queen mother. Manthara later convinced Kaikeyi to demand two boons granted to her years earlier by Dasharatha. King Dasharatha will be obliged to fulfill them.

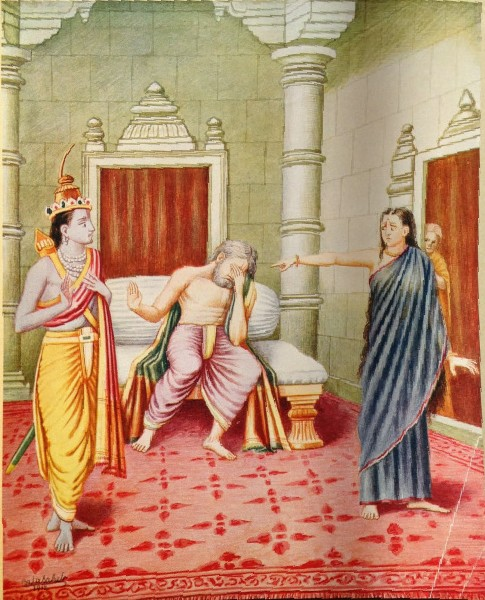
Kaikeyi invokes the two boons granted to her by Dasharatha

As her two boons, Kaikeyi demanded that Bharata be crowned king, and Rama be sent to the forest for a period of fourteen years.

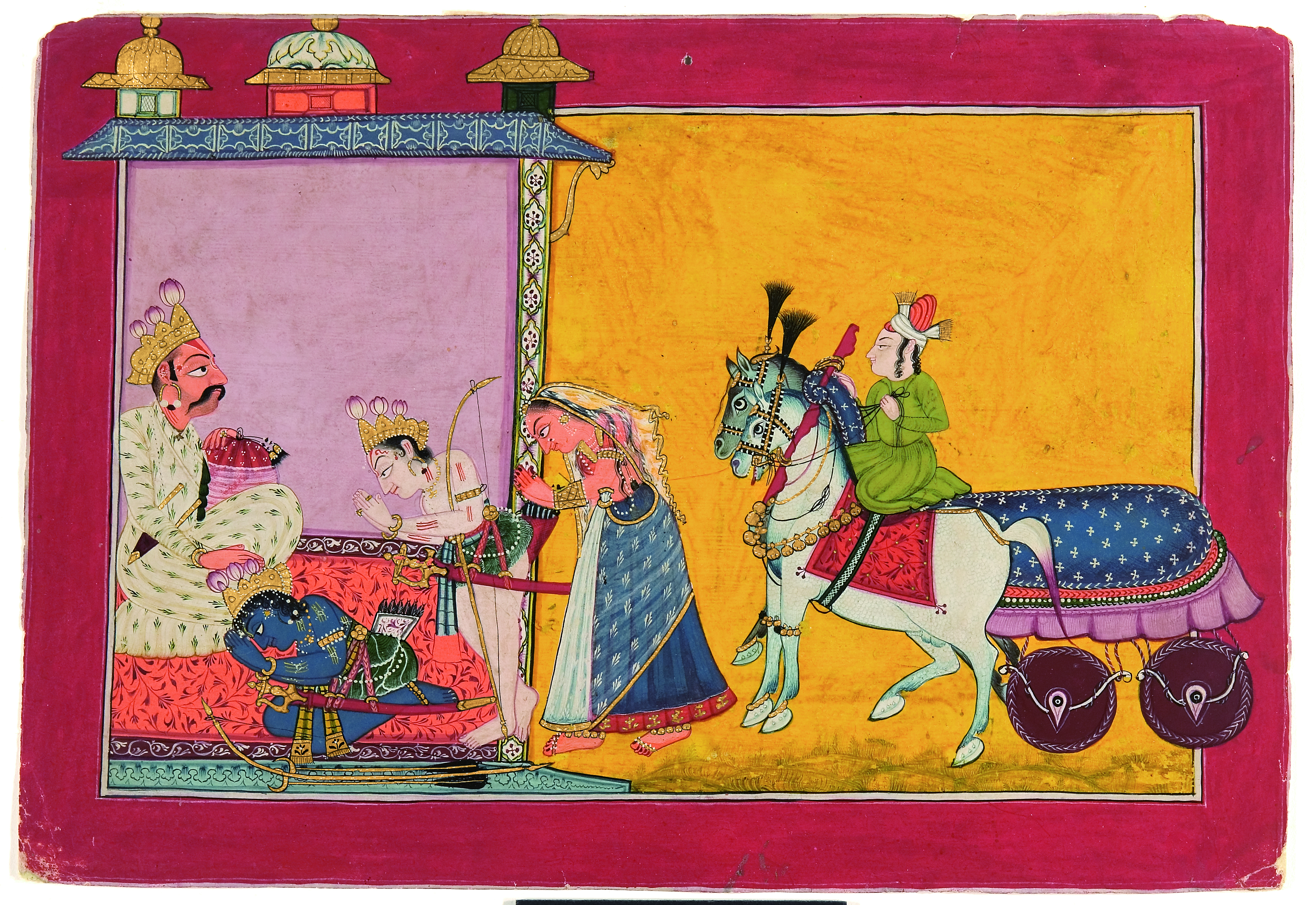
Rama taking Dashratha’s leave

=== Killing of Shravana Kumara and death ===
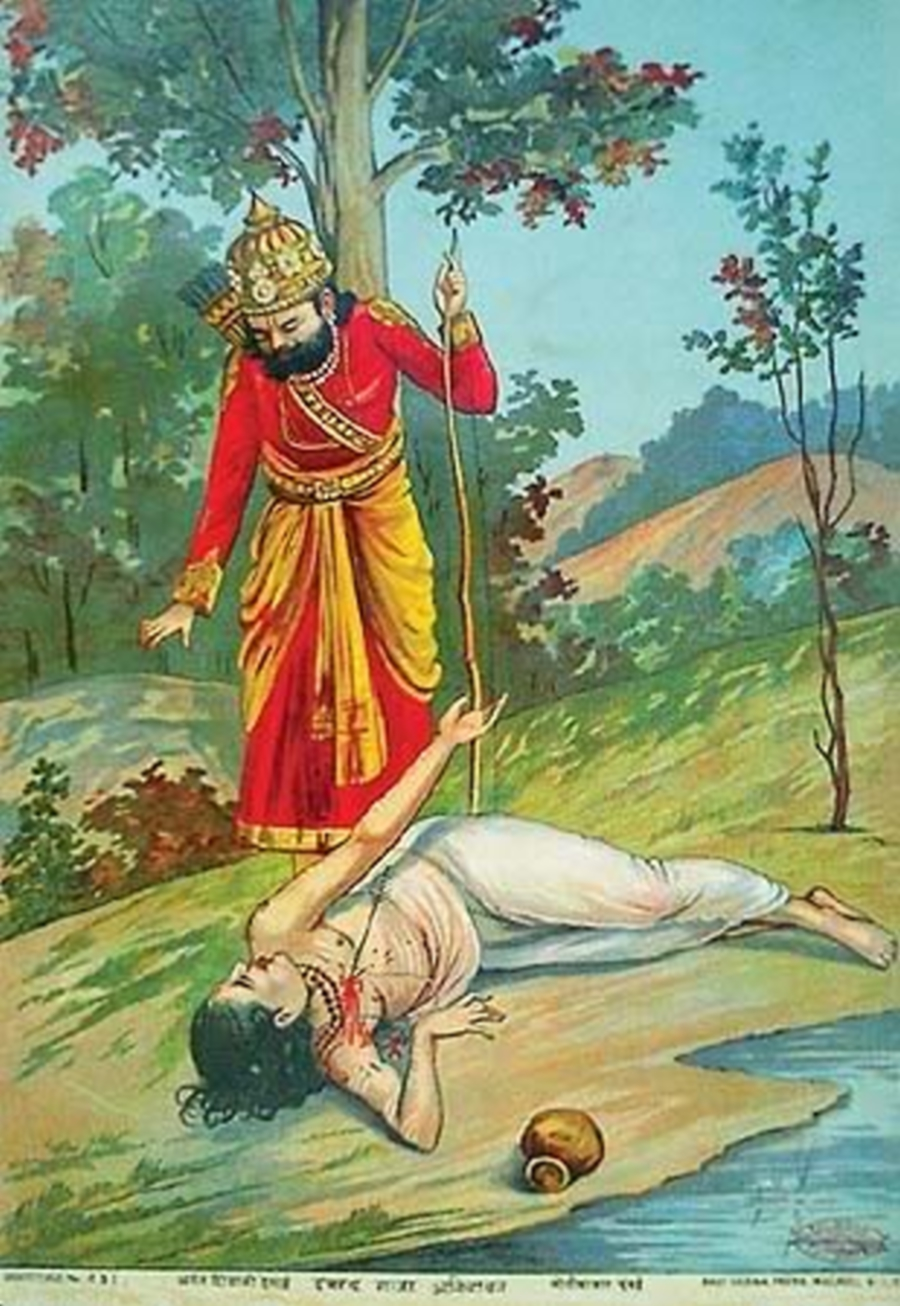
Dasharatha kills Shravana Kumara

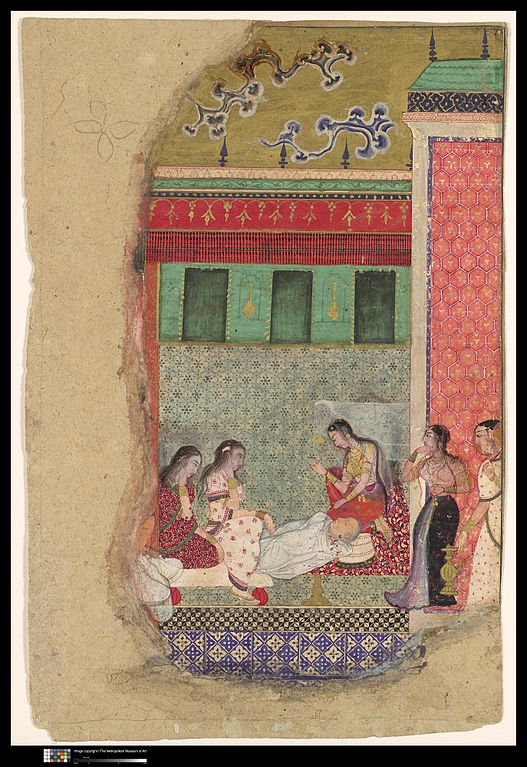
The death of King Dasharatha the father of Rama

After Rama's departure to the forest, Dasharatha lay in his bed with a wailing Kaushalya. He suddenly remembered an incident which had occurred in his past. He narrated to Kausalya and Sumitra about how, by accident, he had killed a young man named Shravana, mistaking him to be a deer.

Dasharatha, who was then the crown prince, had gone hunting on the banks of River Sarayu. He was an expert in hunting by determining the direction of sound and heard the gurgle of an animal drinking water. Mistaking it to be deer, Dasharatha shot an arrow. He became mortified when he heard a human cry as the arrow found its target. Dasharatha hurried there to find a boy lying sprawled on the banks of the river with an arrow lodged in his chest. Dasharatha was aghast and profusely apologised to the young Shravana trying to revive and help him. The boy forgave Dasharatha for his unintentional, unrighteous act, and demanded that Dasharatha pull the arrow out of his chest. He also told him to take the pitcher of water to his blind parents, who must be waiting for him since they were thirsty because of all the travel. The boy died from his injury.

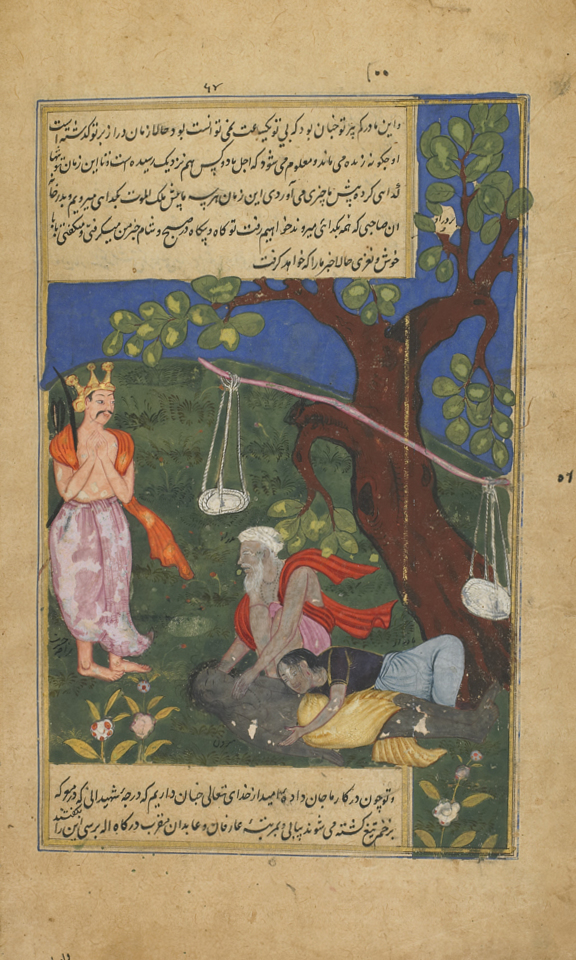
The blind hermit and his wife mourn their son, who was slain accidentally by Dasarath.

Dasharatha approached the blind couple and told them about their son's unfortunate death. The parents, grief-stricken, cursed Prince Dasharatha: "Just as we are suffering and dying due to the separation from our beloved son, you too shall have the same fate."

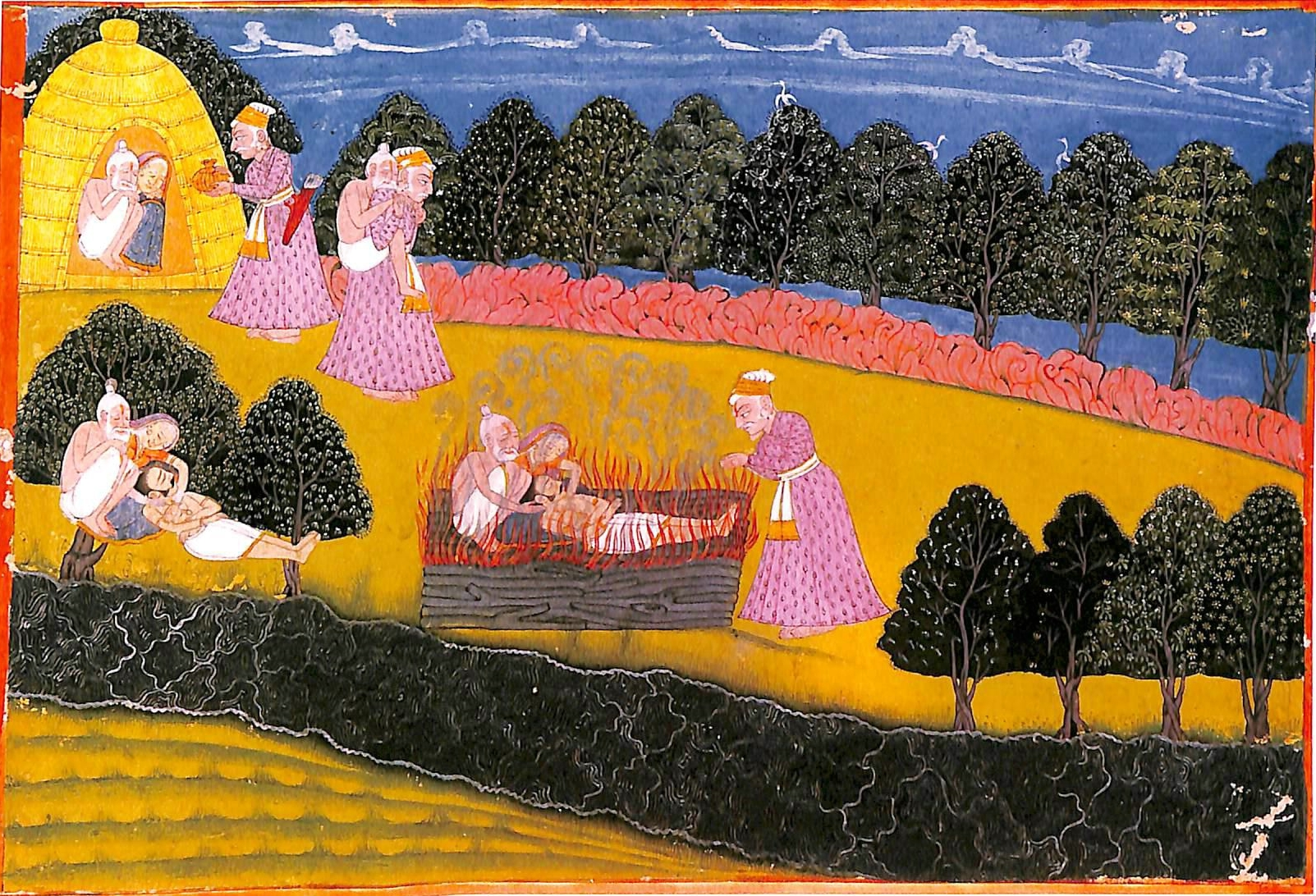
Dasharatha cremates Shravana and his parents (painting by Laharu of Chamba)

Dasharatha concluded the chapter by saying that his end was near and the curse of Shravana's parents had taken effect.

== In popular culture ==
=== Films ===
- Aditya Varma portrayed Dasharatha in the 1997 Telugu film Ramayanam.
- Dilip Sinha voiced Dasharatha in the 2010 animated Hindi film Ramayana: The Epic.
- Rajesh Dubey portrayed him in the 2024 Hindi film Singham Again.
- Arun Govil portrayed him in the 2026 Hindi film, Ramayana: Part 1.

=== Television ===
- Bal Dhuri portrayed Dasharatha in the 1987 series Ramayan.
- Gajendra Chauhan portrayed Dasharatha in the 2002 series Ramayan.
- Pankaj Kalra portrayed Dasharatha in the 2008 series Ramayan.
- Mihir Mishra portrayed Dasharatha in the 2011 series Devon Ke Dev...Mahadev.
- Rishabh Shukla portrayed Dasharatha in 2000 series Vishnu Puran and 2012 series Ramayan.
- Yogesh Mahajan portrayed Dasharatha in the 2015 series Sankat Mochan Mahabali Hanumaan.
- Dalip Tahil portrayed Dasharatha in the 2015 series Siya Ke Ram.
- Ankur Nayyar portrayed Dasharatha in the 2018 series Ram Siya Ke Luv Kush.
- Shishir Sharma portrayed Kausalya in the 2021 web series Ramyug.
- Aarav Chowdhary portrayed Dasharatha in the 2024 series Shrimad Ramayan.
- Sandeep Mohan portrayed Dasharatha in 2024 DD National series Kakabhushundi Ramayan- Anasuni Kathayein.

==== YouTube ====
- Dinesh Gurjar portrayed Dasharatha in 2024 YouTube series Valmiki Ramayan.

=== Novels ===
- The character appears under the name Dasharath in Vaishnavi Patel's 2022 novel Kaikeyi.

== See also ==
- Kausalya
- Sumitra
- Kaikeyi
