= Vibhandaka =

Sage in Hinduism

- Affiliation: Rishi
- Texts: Mahabharata

Genealogy
- Children: Rishyashringa

Vibhandaka (Sanskrit: विभण्डक, romanized: Vibhāṇḍaka) is a rishi in Hinduism, belonging to the lineage of Sage Kashyapa. His son was Rishyashringa, featured in the epic Ramayana.

== Legend ==
The Mahabharata states that Sage Vibhandaka once chanced upon Urvashi, the most beautiful of the apsaras. While observing her, he was so aroused that he produced seminal fluid, which fell into some water. The water was consumed by a female deer, after which the creature subsequently became pregnant, and gave birth to a son whom the sage called Rishyashringa, named for the horns upon his head when he was born.

== Matha ==
According to the Advaita Vedanta, Adi Sankara established four Maṭhas (Sanskrit: मठ) (monasteries), with the headquarters at Dvārakā in the West, Jagannatha Puri in the East, Sringeri in the South and Badrikashrama in the North. Each matha was headed by one of his four main disciples, who each continues the Vedanta Sampradaya.

According to Pandey, these Mathas were not established by Shankara himself, but were originally ashrams established by Vibhāņdaka and his son Ŗșyaśŗnga. Shankara inherited the ashrams at Dvārakā and Sringeri, and shifted the ashram at Śŗngaverapura to Badarikāśrama, and the ashram at Angadeśa to Jagannātha Purī.

== Sources ==
- Pandey, S.L. (2000), Pre-Sankara Advaita. In: Chattopadhyana (gen.ed.), "History of Science, Philosophy and Culture in Indian Civilization. Volume II Part 2: Advaita Vedanta", Delhi: Centre for Studies in Civilizations
