= Rishyasringa =

Sage mentioned in ancient Indian scriptures

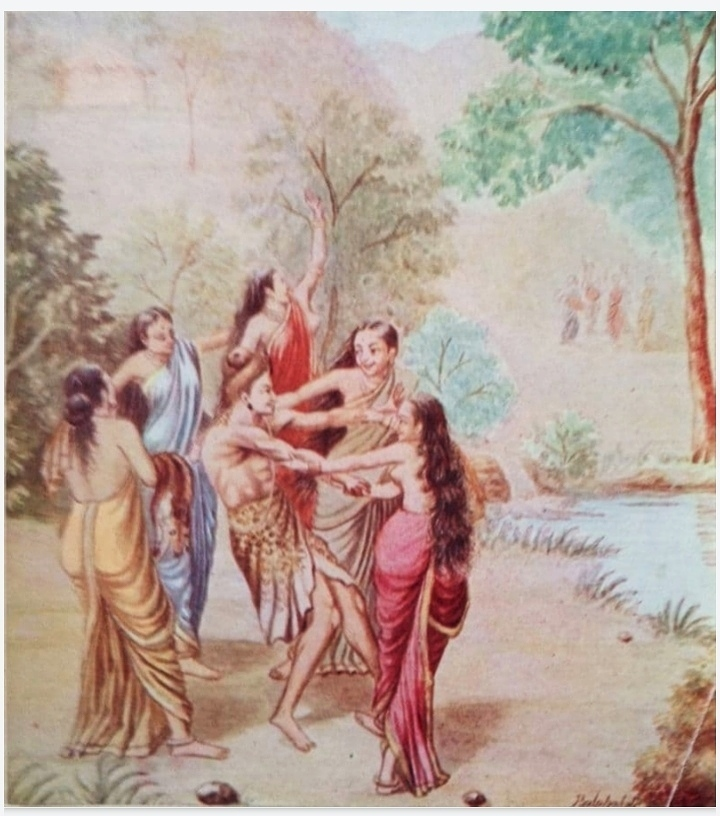
- Rishyasringa being lured by dancing girls, a painting by Balasaheb Pandit Pant Pratinidhi
- Other names: Shringi Rishi, Ekashringa

Genealogy
- Parents: Vibhandaka (father)
- Spouse: Shanta

Rishyasringa (Sanskrit: ऋष्यशृङ्ग; IAST: Ṛṣyaśṛṅga; Pali: Isisiṅga) is a rishi mentioned in Hindu scriptures from the first millennium BCE. According to the Hindu epics Ramayana and Mahabharata, he was a boy born with the horns of a deer who became a seer and was lured by royal courtesans, which led to the yajna (fire sacrifice) of King Dasharatha. His story also occurs in the Buddhist Jatakas in the last millennium BCE, where he is mentioned as the son of Bodhisatta and the subject of a seduction attempt by royal courtesans.

== Hindu legends ==
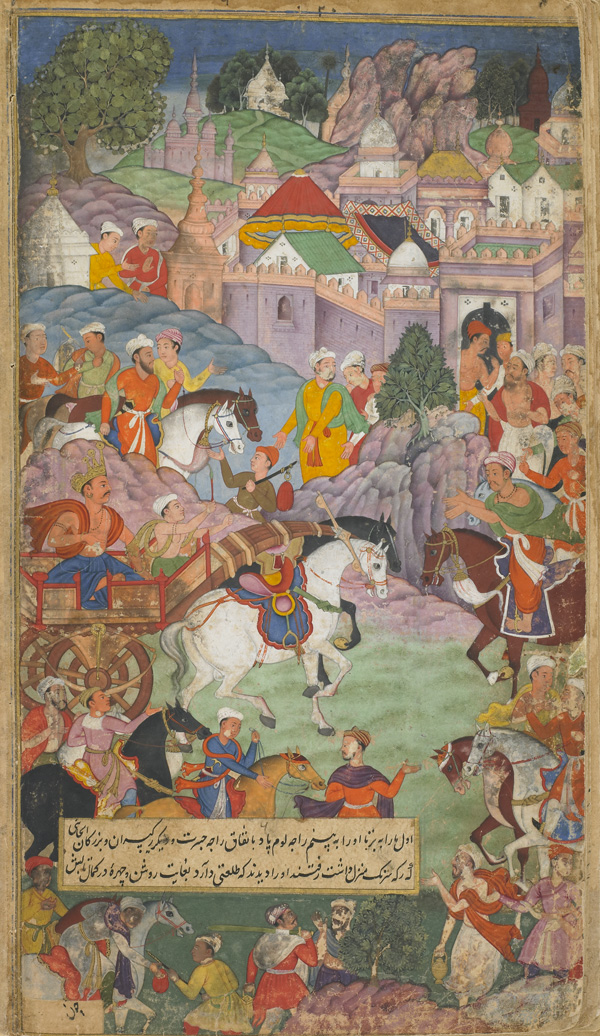
Dasaratha sets out toward Anga to invite Rsyasrnga to his abode – Folio from the Ramayana of Valmiki (The Freer Ramayana), Vol. 1, folio 20

The story of Rishyasringa briefly appears in the Ramayana, while a detailed account is narrated in the Mahabharata.

=== Birth ===
According to the Mahabharata, Vibhandaka, a renowned sage and a son of Kashyapa, travels in Mahahrada, when he sees Urvashi, the most beautiful apsara (nymph). Aroused, he emits his seed, which fell into the river. A doe, who is a cursed apsara, swallows it and becomes pregnant due to the sage's miraculous powers. After she gives birth to a boy, she is liberated from the curse and returns to heaven. The boy is born with horns and because of which, he is named Rishyasringa. Vibhandaka decides to raise him isolated from society. Rishyasringa grows up in his father's ashram in the forest, unaware of existence of any female. He practices brahmacharya and acquires magical and miraculous powers due to his chastity.

=== Temptation ===
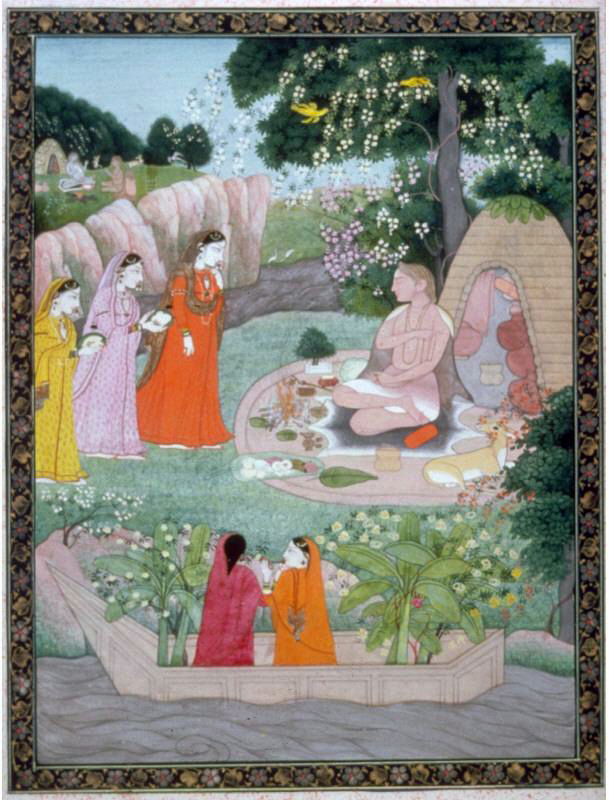
Rishyasringa is enticed by girls sent by King Romapada

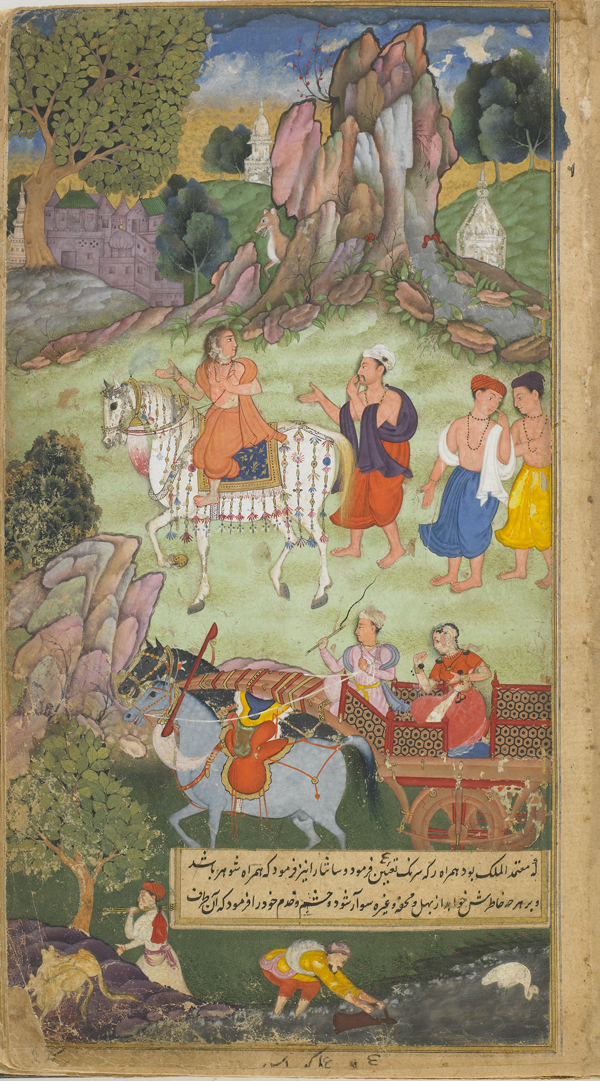
Rsyasrnga travels to Ayodhya with Santa

Meanwhile, Romapada—the King of Anga—offends a Brahmin, due to which no other Brahmin agrees to perform yajna (fire-sacrifice). This upsets Indra, the king of the gods, and he stops raining on Anga. As a result, the kingdom suffers from drought and famine. Romapada is told that the only way to bring rainfall is by bringing a man with perfect chastity into the kingdom. Romapada learns of Rishyasringa and despite his fear of the power and anger of Vibhandaka, he sends some courtesans to Rishyasringa to bring him into his kingdom.

During Vibhandaka's absence, the women come to his ashram and meet Rishyasringa. They tell him that they were hermits. Rishyasringa becomes astonished by seeing their appearance and invites them to perform tapas (penance) with him. Before Vibhandaka arrives, the women leave the place. Rishyasringa becomes love-sick and ignores his daily duties. The next day, the courtesans return and take Rishyasringa to Anga. As a result, the kingdom receives bountiful rains and Rishyasringa marries Shanta. Much of the story is taken up by accounts of the feelings of the young man as he becomes aware of women for the first time.

The story can be found in both the Ramayana and the Mahabharata. According to the Ramayana, Rishyasringa was the chief priest when the King Dasharatha performed a yajna to beget progeny, and Rama, Bharata, and the twins Lakshmana and Shatrughna were born.

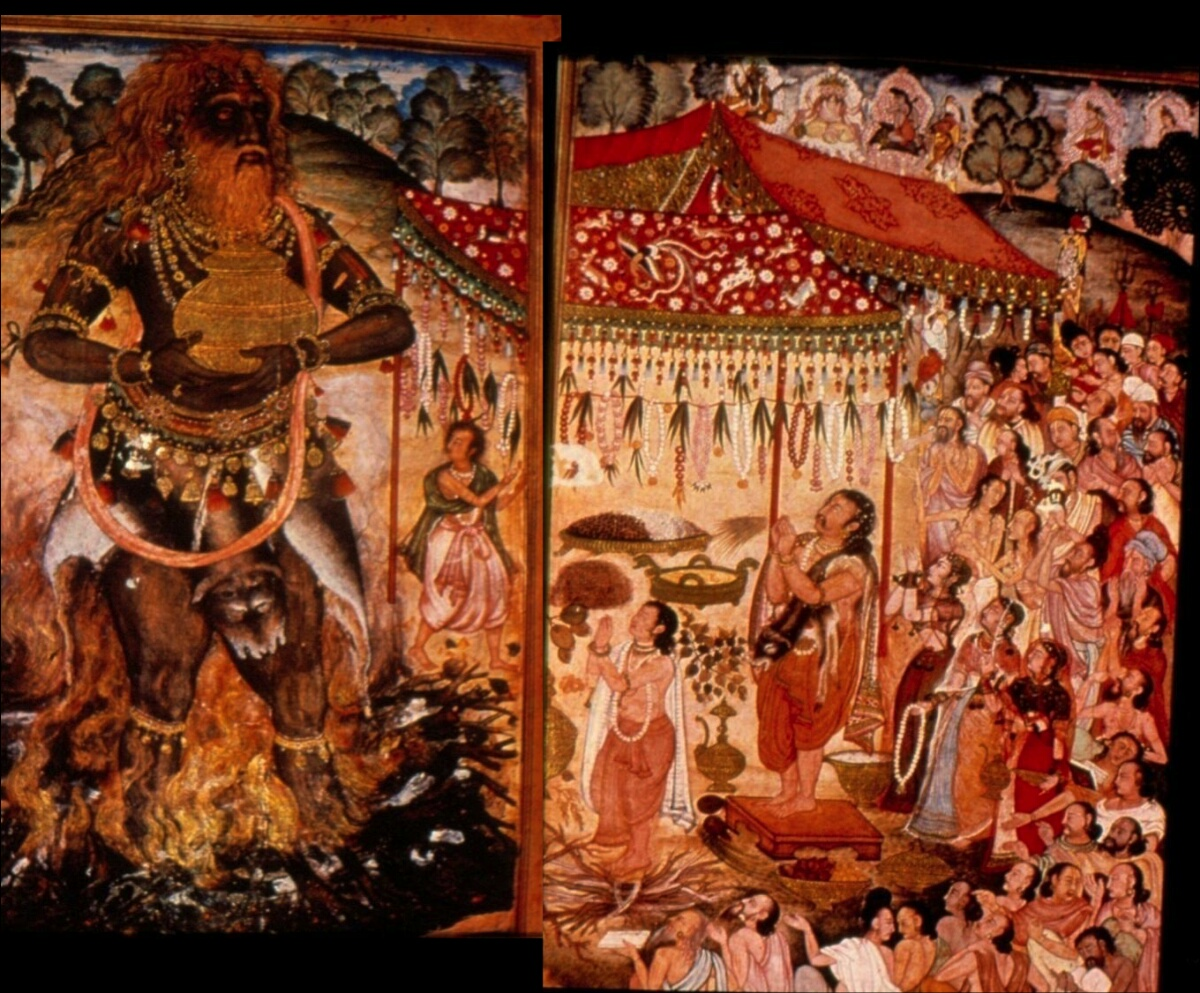
Rishyasringa performs yajna for Dasharatha

== Buddhist legends ==
=== Naḷinikā Jātaka ===
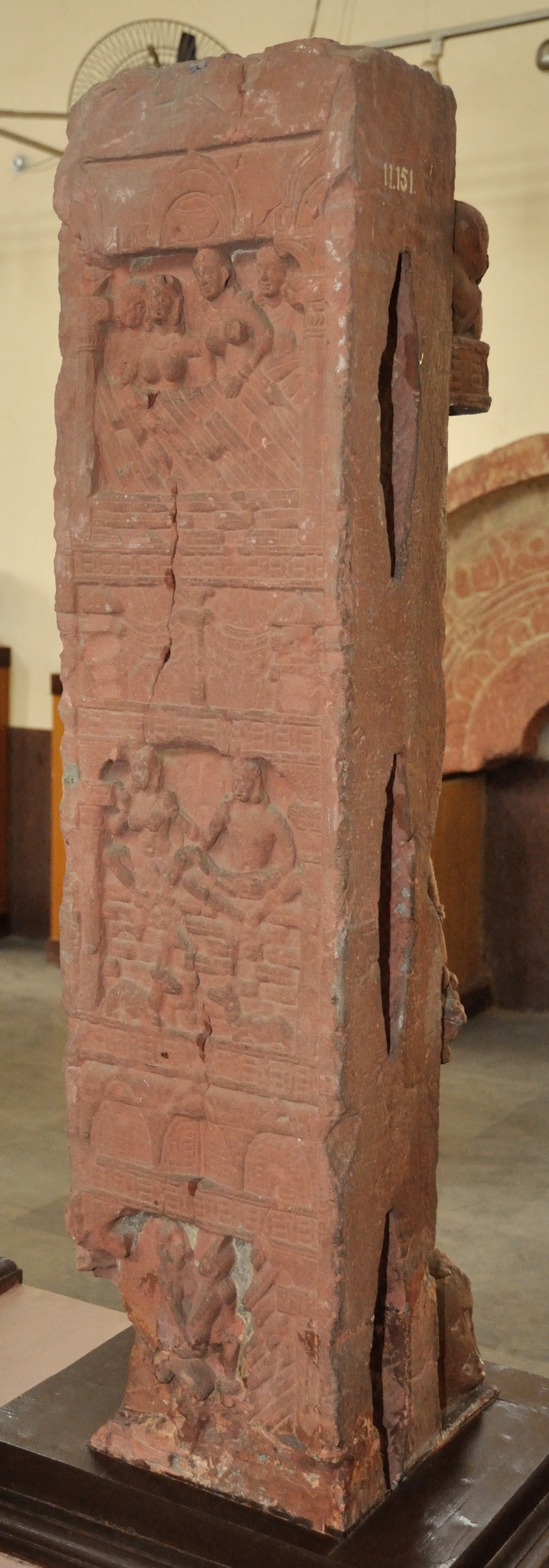
Story of Rishi Sringa Reverse Shows Woman Carrying Wine Pot and Holding Bunch of Grapes; c. 2nd century CE; Bhuteshwar Mathura Museum

The Naḷinikā Jātaka (Jā 526) introduces a past life of the Buddha, a sage, living alone in the Himālayas. There is semen in the urine he passes, a doe who eats the grass in that place gets pregnant from it. A human boy named Isisiṅga (Pali) is later born to the deer and he grows up in complete seclusion from mankind, and most importantly, from womankind. He even doesn't know the difference in the body and appearance of the two.

The boy's ascetic power becomes so great that it disturbs the god Sakka, the lord of heaven, who causes a drought to occur in the country and blames it on the boy. He then convinces the King to send his daughter to seduce him and to break the austerity of the young seer and to reduce his ascetic power. The King and his daughter accept Sakka's reasoning and in good faith – and for the benefit of the country – agree to be part of the plot.

The girl dresses up as an ascetic and while the father is away gathering roots and fruits in the forest, she manages to seduce the boy, who has never seen a woman before. Through their revelling, the boy does indeed lose his powers, after which the girl departs. When his father returns, the infatuated boy informs him of the girl, only to be instructed and rebuked by his father. He then repents for his actions.

=== Alambusā Jātaka ===
Jātaka 523, the Alambusā Jātaka, also recounts a similar story of Isisinga, in one other previous life of Bodhisatta. Here, Sakka chooses a heavenly nymph named Alambusā to seduce the ascetic. The outcome is the same: the sage is seduced, repents and Sakka is thwarted. In response, he grants a boon to the nymph that she will never be a temptress again.

The story also appears in the Mahāvastu (Jones' translation pp. 139–147), but Ekaśr̥ṅga, as he is known here, is the Bodhisattva, and Nalinī is a past life of Yaśodharā. A major variation in this version of the story is Ekaśr̥ṅga's ignorance of his marriage to the girl. He succumbs to worldly responsibilities, eventually becoming king and fathering 32 children before retiring again to the forest and regaining his former powers.

== Veneration ==
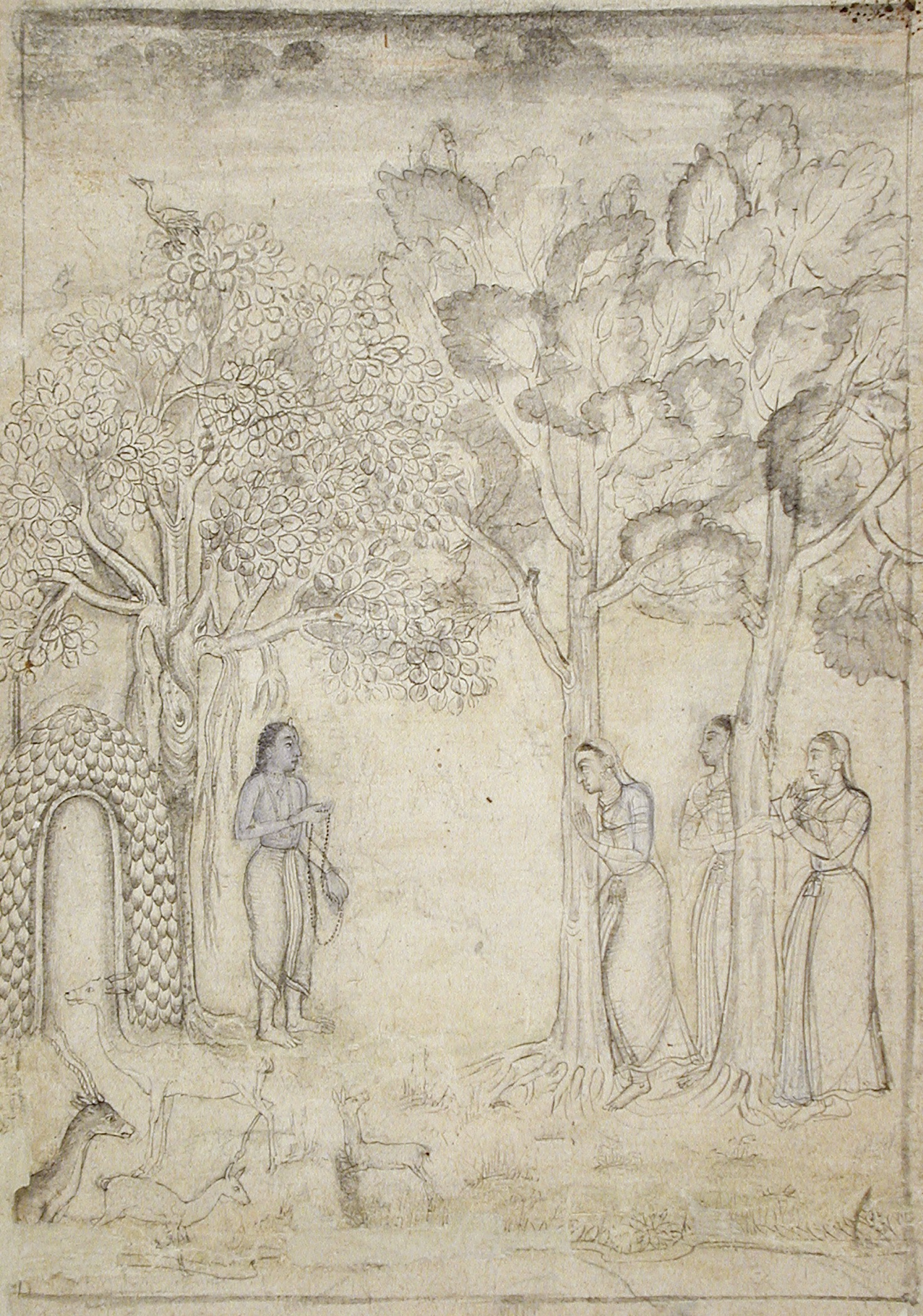
The Ascetic Rishyasringa at His Hermitage

According to the Tuṅgabhadrāmahātmya which is a division of a Mahapurana, Rishyasringa is regarded to have been born from a place near Sringeri in Karnataka. There is an ancient big temple nearby which is believed to be the place where he lived before moving to Ayodhya. Sringeri is also known as ShringaGiri (Sanskrit: the hills where RishyaShringa resided). The Shiva linga with which the sage merged, can be seen today at the temple in Kigga.

There is a temple of Rishyashringa named 'Chehni fort' situated in Banjar tehsil of Kullu District Himachal Pradesh. In Banjar valley, Rishyasringa is called "Shringa Rishi" by the locals. An idol of Shringa Rishi with the goddess Shanta is present in the temple. This place is about 50 km from Kullu. Rishyasringa is the presiding deity of this secluded valley named Banjar.

== Worship ==
In the Kullu district of Himachal Pradesh and at Kigga near Sringeri town of Karnataka, there are temples dedicated to Rishyasringa and his wife Shanta. Many attribute Sihawa, a hill from which Mahanadi originates, as a site of Shringi Rishi's Ashrama. its natural location, away from population, further affirms the claims.

== See also ==
- Advaita Vedanta
- Vaisali (film)
- Singheshwar
- Phyllis and Aristotle
