= Thriprayar Temple =

Hindu temple in Thrissur

Thriprayar Shree Ramaswami Temple
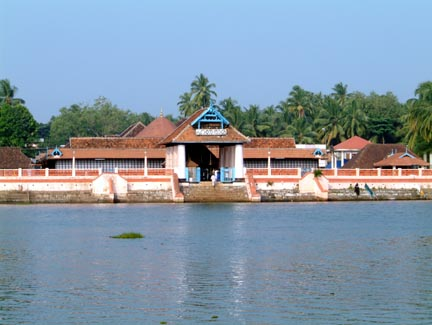
- Temple entrance seen from bank of river

- Ramasamy Temple, Triprayar, Thrissur, Kerala

Religion
- Affiliation: Hinduism
- District: Thrissur
- Deity: Rama
- Festivals: Arattupuzha Pooram, Ekadasi

Location
- Location: Triprayar
- State: Kerala
- Country: India
- Coordinates: 10.414159°N 76.115486°E

Architecture
- Type: Architecture of Kerala

Specifications
- Temple: One
- Elevation: 27.33 m (90 ft)

Thriprayar Shree Ramaswami Temple is Hindu temple situated in Triprayar in Thrissur district of Kerala state in India. The deity is Rama, the seventh incarnation of Vishnu, with four arms bearing a conch, a discus, a bow, and a garland. The temple is situated on the bank of 'Thirupurayar' which means The Sacred River in front of Temple. Thirupurayar pronounced as 'Triprayar' during the course of time (decades Or centuries) This canal later developed as Inland Water Route in end of 18th Century.Canoli Canal, which connects Kozhikode and Kodungallur. The temple deity is the presiding deity of Arattupuzha Pooram. Along with Rama, there are shrines for Shiva as Dakshinamoorthy, Ganesha, Shastha and Krishna, and there is also worship for Hanuman, Karthikeya, Chathan and Serpent gods

== Story behind the origin of the temple ==
The Rama idol is believed to be worshipped by Shri Krishna at Dwarka. After Krishna's ascension to heaven, this idol was immersed into the sea. Years later, a fishermen found the idol while fishing.

== Offerings ==
The main offerings are:

- Chathan Bhandaram - to get rid of evil influences
- Kadhina Vedi - to commemorate Hanuman's arrival after the search for Sita.
- Meenoottu - feeding fishes in the river. Believed to be good for asthma patients.
- Other offerings include milk payasam, Chandhanam Charthal

=== Nalambalam ===
Nalambalams are four Hindu temples dedicated to Rama and his brothers respectively. Pilgrimage to these temples on the first day of the Malayalam month of Karkadakam is considered auspicious. These 4 temples are:

- Thriprayar Temple - Rama
- Koodalmanikyam Temple, Irinjalakuda - Bharata
- Thirumoozhikkulam Lakshmana Perumal Temple - Lakshmana
- Payammal Shatrughna Temple - Shatrughna

== See also ==
- Nalambalam

== Images ==
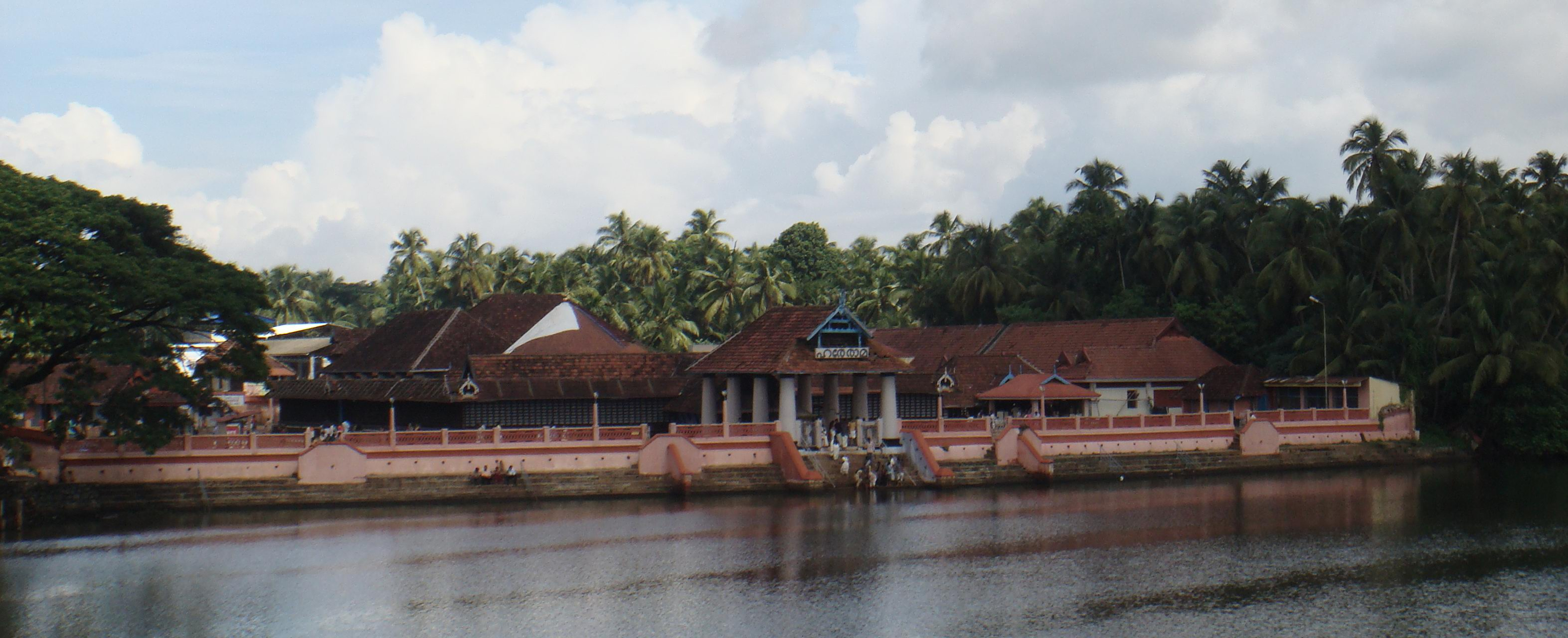
Thriprayar Temple

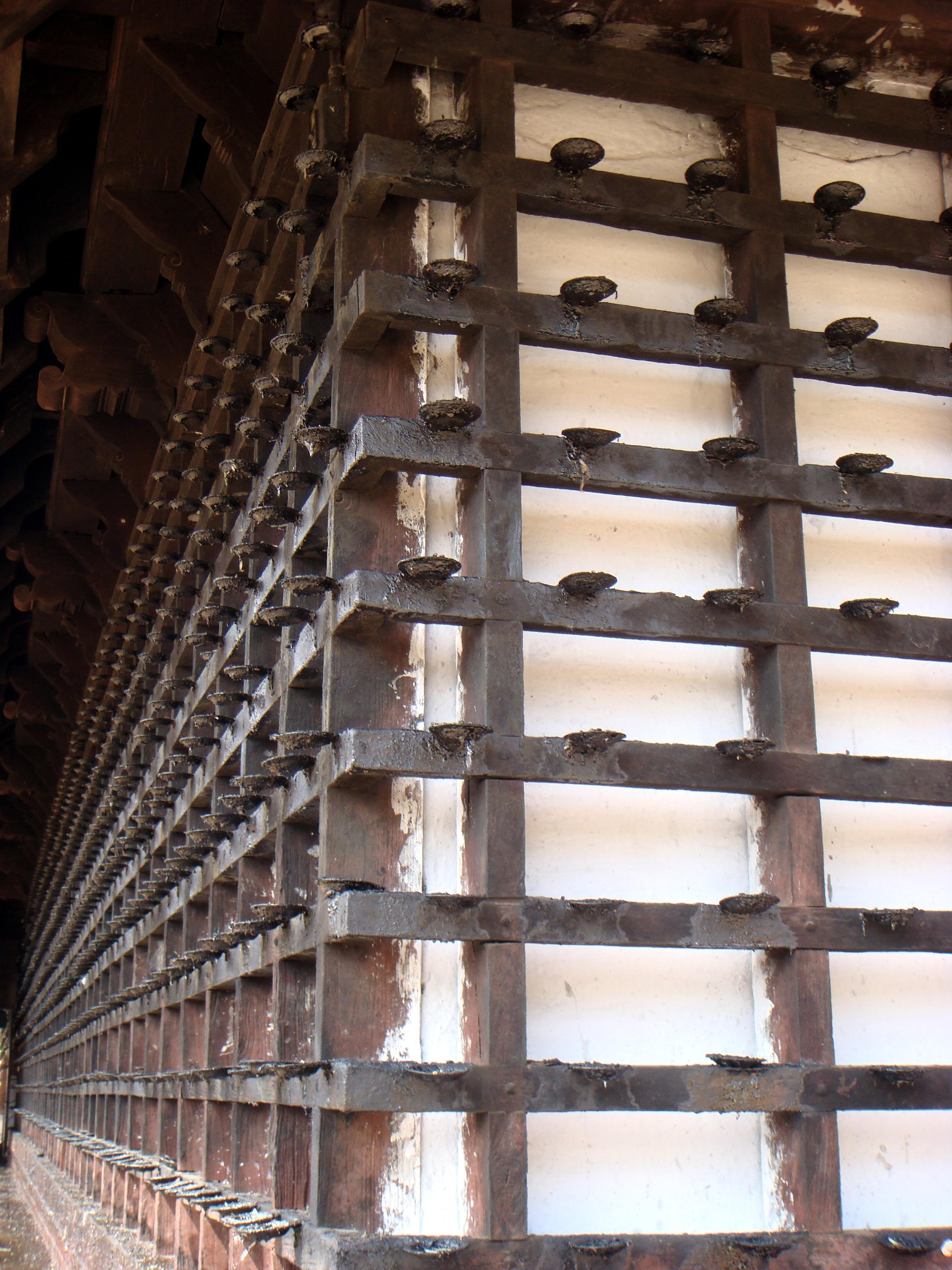
Lightes on the walls

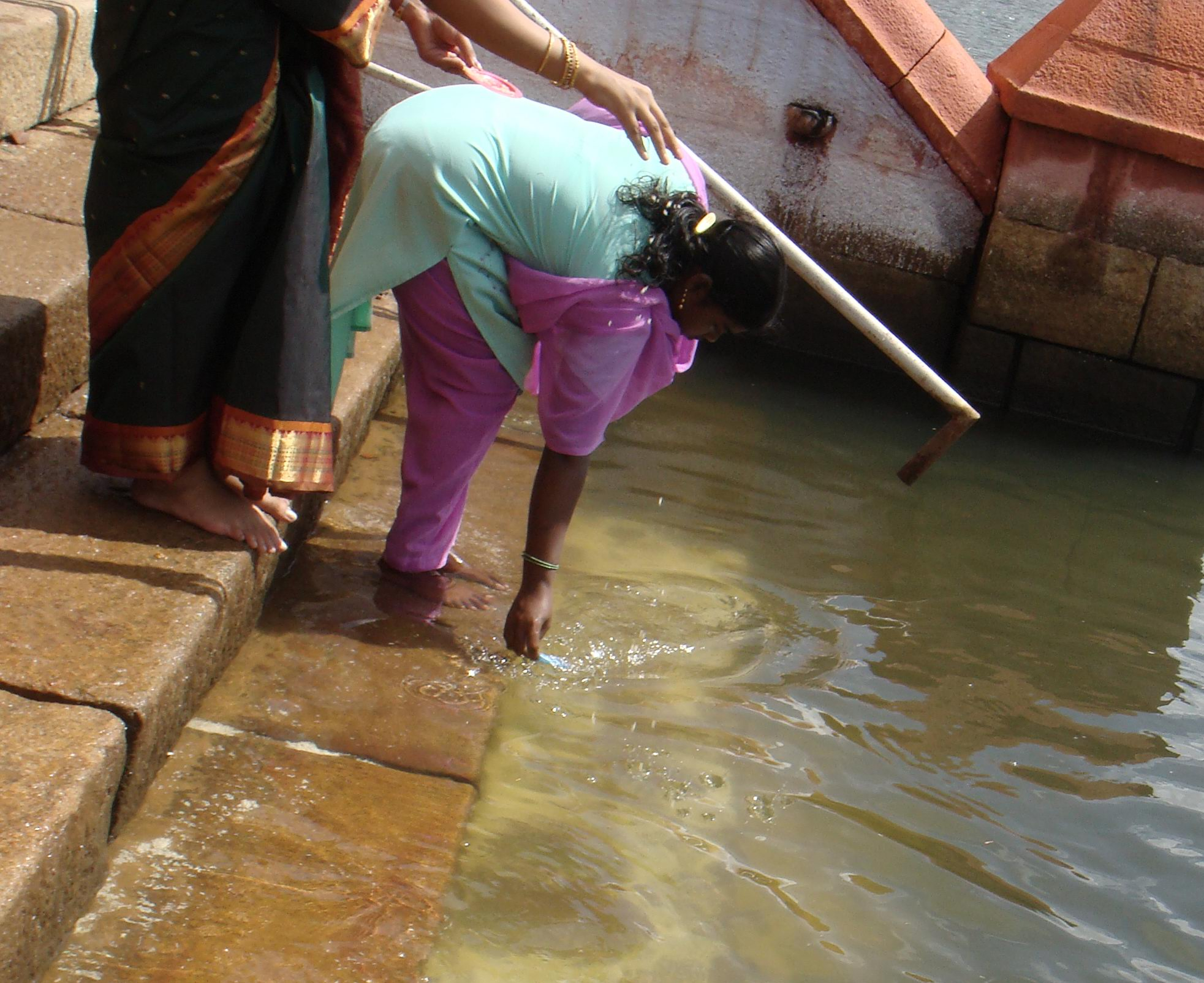
മീനൂട്ട്

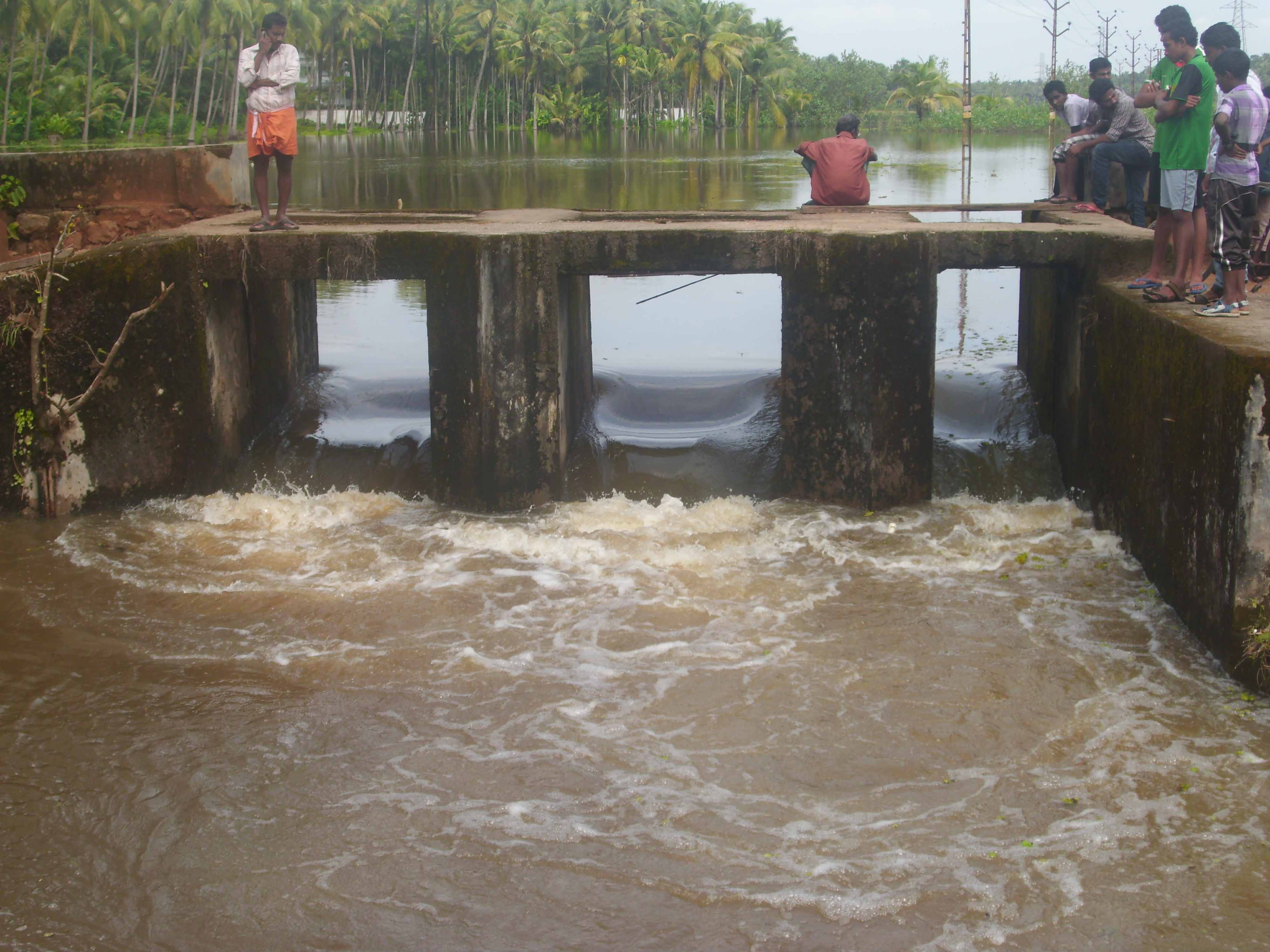
Sreeraman Chira, Chemmappilly
