= Sree Narayana College =

Sree Narayana College or Sree Narayana Guru College may refer to the following institutions in Kerala, India named after Sree Narayana Guru, managed by the corporate management of Sree Narayana Trust, Kollam, Kerala:

== Affiliated with A. P. J. Abdul Kalam Technological University, Thiruvananthapuram ==
- Sree Narayana Guru College of Engineering and Technology, Payyanur

== Affiliated with Kannur University ==
- S. N. College, Kannur

== Affiliated with the University of Kerala ==
- Sree Narayana College, Chempazhanthy, Thiruvananthapuram Dist.
- Sree Narayana College, Cherthala, Alappuzha Dist.
- Sree Narayana College, Varkala, Thiruvananthapuram Dist.
- Sree Narayana College for Women, Kollam Dist.
- Sree Narayana College, Chathannur, Kollam Dist.
- T. K. Madhava Memorial College, Nagiarkulangara, Alappuzha
- Sree Narayana Guru College of Legal Studies

== Affiliated with the University of Calicut ==
- Sree Narayana College, Nattika, Thrissur Dist.,
- Sree Narayana College, Alathur, Palakkad Dist.
- Sree Narayana College, (M.P.M.M.S.N. Trusts College), Shornur, Palakkad Dist.
- Sree Narayana Guru College of Advanced Studies, Nattika
- Sree Narayana Guru College, Chelannur (SNG College Chelannur), Kozhikkode Dist.
