= Balachandran Vadakkedath =

Indian writer, author, scholar, literary critic

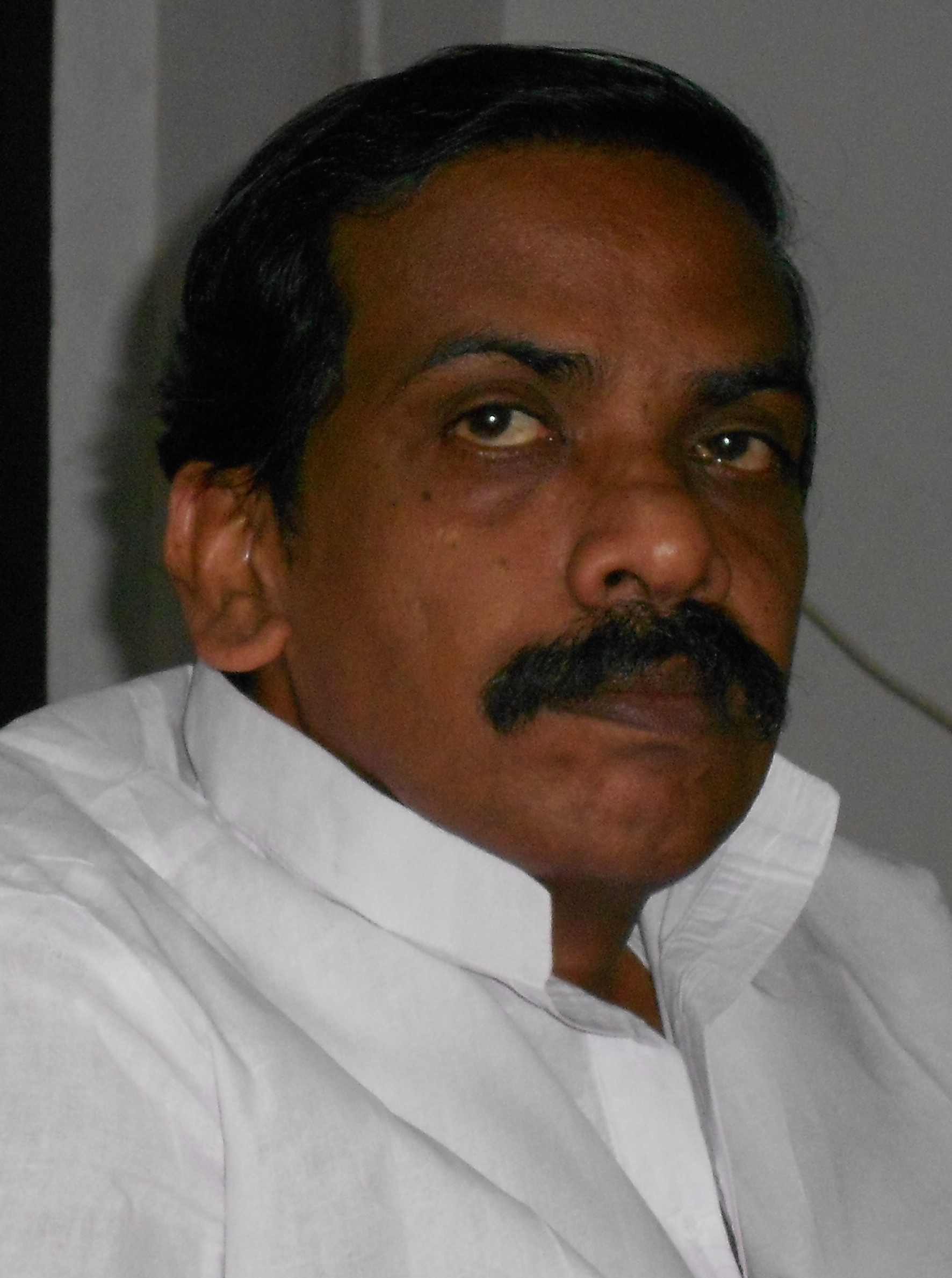
- Born: 1955; Thrissur, Kerala, India
- Died: 19 October 2024 (aged 68–69)
- Education: St. Thomas College, Thrissur
- Occupations: writer, author, scholar, cultural activist, literary critic
- Known for: cultural activism
- Awards: A.R. Rajarajavarma Award; Kuttippuzha Award; Fr. Vadakkan Award; Kavyamandalam Award, Gurudarshana Award; Sreeshailam Literary Award; C.P. Menon Award; Kalamandalam Mukundaraja Award

Balachandran Vadakkedath (1955 – 19 October 2024) also spelt as Balachandran Vadakedath was an Indian cultural activist, writer, orator and literary critic. He was regarded as one of the cultural icons in the state of Kerala and had published numerous books emphasing his firm interest on literary work throughout his lifetime.

== Biography ==
He was born in 1955 at Nattika, a small village in the Thrissur district, Kerala. He received his primary education at St. Thomas College, Thrissur. He was born to Ramachandran Vadakkedath who was also a renowned literary critic and scholar.

== Career ==
He held several portfolios and key positions during his career including positions such as Secretary of the Kerala Kalamandalam, vice-president of the Kerala Sahitya Akademi, membership of the Kendra Sahitya Academy, membership of the executive committee of the Samastha Kerala Sahitya Parishad. He also actively served in as the member of the General Council of Sahitya Akademi. He was also serving as the Chairman of 'Akam' Samskarika Vedi and was also one of the founding members of Anganam Samskarika Vedi. He also served as the President of Employees' Concord for the Nattika constituency for a brief stint and also endured a stint working as the Thrissur Taluk Secretary of the N G O Association.

He was acclaimed as an established speaker with thought-provoking ideas at his disposal, and was also regarded as a notable socio-political activist, having taken control of the proceedings in the field of literary criticism. Just like his father, he also made a case for himself, stamping his authority in the field of literature by publishing books focusing on Kerala's culture. His literary work had a profound effect in Kerala, fetching him a cultural icon tag in his home state. Vakkinte Soundarya Sasthram, Nishedathinte Kala, Maranavum Soundaryavum, Uthara Samvedanam, Ramanan Engane Vayikkaruthu, Vayanayude Upanishath, Puthiya Edathu Paksham, Cheruthunilpinte Deshangal and Arthangalude Kalaham are hailed and highly rated as some of his memorable notable works. During his career, he was conferred with many prestigious awards and nominations, including having won the Kuttippuzha Award, Kavyamandalam Award, Gurudarshana Award, Sreeshailam Literary Award, A.R. Rajarajavarma Award, C.P. Menon Award, Fr. Vadakkan Award and Kalamandalam Mukundaraja Award.

He was unceremoniously ousted from the position of vice-president of the Sahitya Akademi in 2012 after a series of controversies which began to tumble him related to the handling of Vishva Malayalam Mahotsavam. It also sparked him to engage in protest sitting alone in the akademi courtyard, which triggered huge attention from public. In September 2019, he advocated and showed his support for veteran writer M. K. Sanu as the latter stepped down from his position of chairman of the Vayalar Ramavarma Memorial Trust citing allegations pertaining to external parties with vested interests exerting pressure on him to announce an undeserved candidate as the outright winner of the Vayalar Ramavarma Literary Award for the year 2019.

== Death ==
He experienced constraints owing to deteriorating health issues while on his return to Kozhikode from a long journey. He was eventually admitted to a private hospital in Thrissur. He was pronounced dead at the age of 69 as confirmed by the doctors upon admission to the hospital.

His body was kept for public viewing at the Kerala Sahitya Akademi Hall on 19 October 2024. His funeral was held on 20 October 2024 at his private residence at Triprayar.
