= Thirumoozhikkulam Lakshmana Perumal Temple =

Hindu temple in Kerala, India

Thirumoozhikulam Sree Lakshmanaperumal Temple
- Thirumoozhikkulam Lakshmana Perumaal Temple
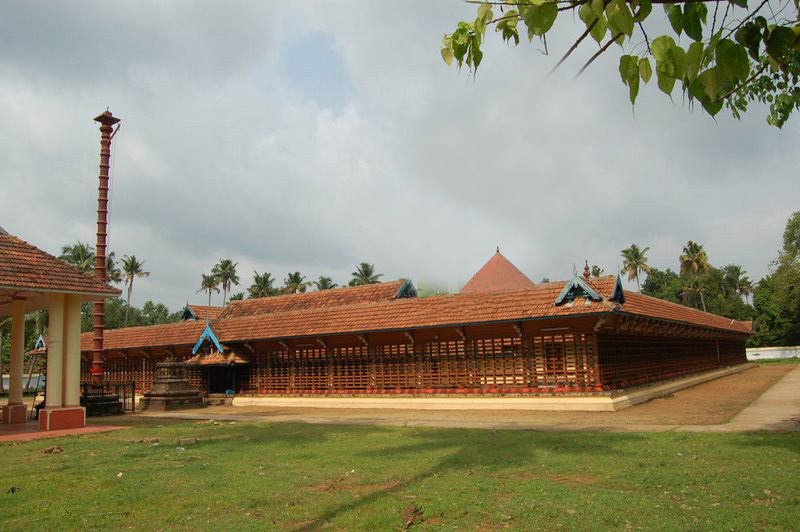

- Sree Lakshmana Perumal Temple, Thirumoozhikkulam, Ernakulam, Kerala

Religion
- Affiliation: Hinduism
- District: Ernakulam
- Deity: Lakshmana Swamy (local name), Thiru Moozhi Kalathan, Appan (Tamizh), Sri SukthiNatha Perumal (Manipravalam/Sanskrit) Maduraveni Thaayaar (Mother); Mangalasaashanam: ThiruMangai Azhwar (3 Paasurams), Nam Azhwar (11 Paasurams); Prathyaksham: Haritha Maharishi; Theertham: Perunkulam, Sanga Theertham, Chittaru
- Features: Tower: Soundarya Vimanam; Temple tank: Poorna Nadi (Sanskrit), Chalakkudy Puzha (local name)

Location
- Location: Thirumoozhikkulam (Near Aluva)
- State: Kerala
- Country: India
- Coordinates: 10.187835°N 76.327099°E

Architecture
- Type: Dravidian architecture (Kerala style)

Specifications
- Direction of façade: Standing (Nindra thirukolam); Facing East (Kizhake thirumuga mandalam)
- Temple: One
- Elevation: 30.38 m (100 ft)

Thirumoozhikulam Sree Lakshmanaperumal Temple is located in Thirumoozhikalam (Moozhikkulam) in Ernakulam district of Kerala, India. The temple finds mention in some of verses of ancient Tamil Vedam (Nalayira Divya Prabhandham) sung by the Sri Vaishnava Alvars, particularly Nammalvar and Tirumangai Alvar and classified as Divya Desams, the 108 holy temples revered in the canon. This belongs to one of the 13 Malai Naatu (Kerala/Chera) Divya Desams, the Divya Desams located in Kerala.

The temple is associated with the legend of Ramayana where Rama's brother Lakshmana worshipped Rama along with their other brother Bharatha here. The presiding deity took the form of Lakshmana and worshipped here. The temple is one of the four temples that are part of Nalambalam Yatra - Rama at Thriprayar, Bharata at Irinjalakuda, Lakshmana at Moozhikkulam and Shathrughna at Payammal.

The temples are believed to be of significant antiquity with contributions at different times by the ruling empires. Constructed in Kerala style architecture, the temple is enshrined within granite walls. It administered by Travancore Devaswom Board of the Government of Kerala. The temple is one of the few temples, where a traditional dance form called Kuttiattam is practiced.

== Legend ==
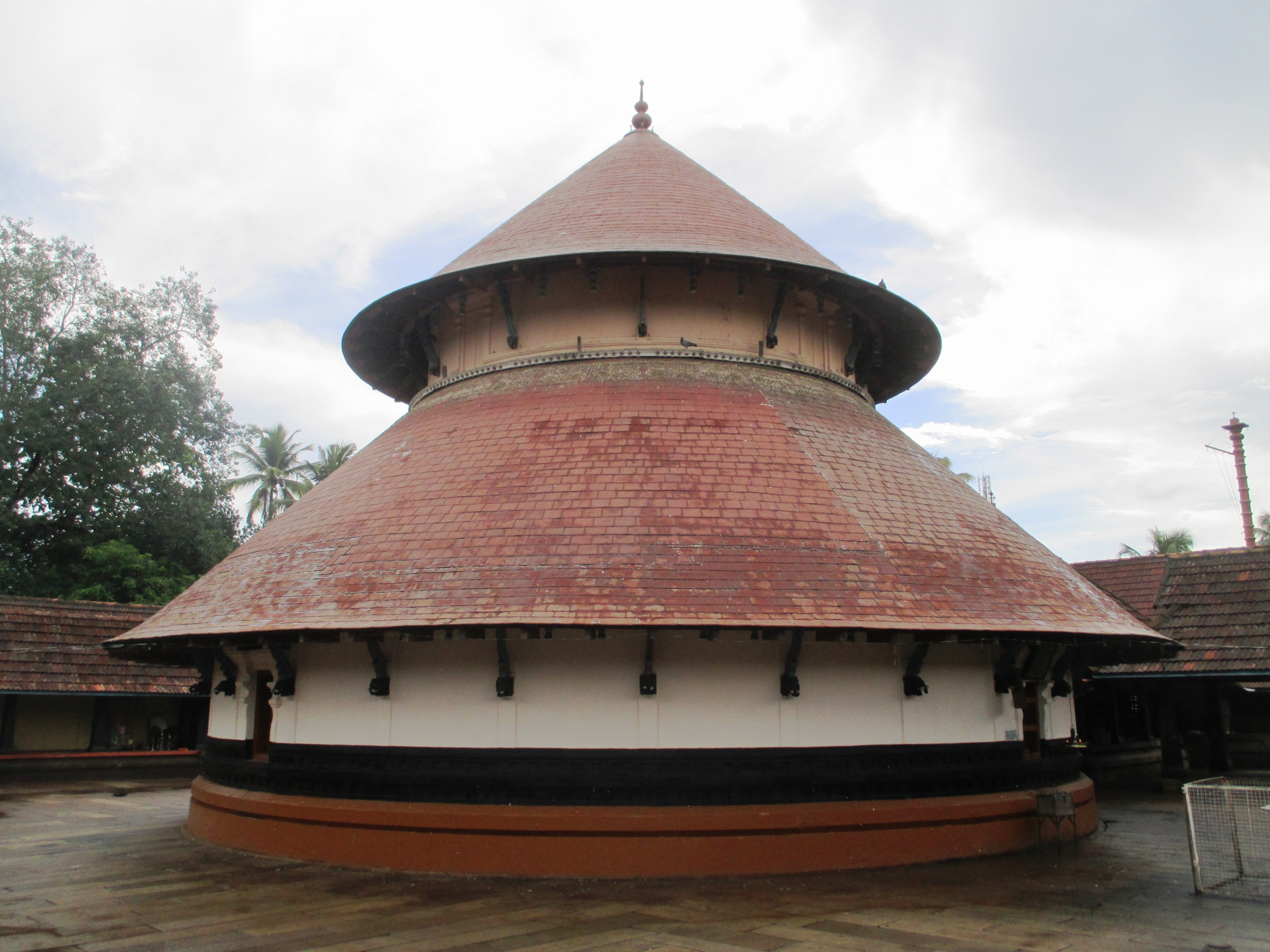

This shrine is associated with legends from the Ramayana. Bharata, the brother of Rama and Lakshmana, came to invite Rama, then in exile, to take over the reins of the kingdom, an angry Lakshmana suspecting Bharata's intentions intended to kill him; however, Bharata's innocence was very soon revealed, and then the two of them offered worship together at Tirumoozhikkalam. The name Tirumoozhikalam is said to have originated from the phrase "tiru-mozhi-kalam", on translation means, the site where sweet words were uttered.

As per another legend, Sage Harita was performing penance at this place. Vishnu was pleased by his devotion and appeared to him. The sage requested Vishnu to provide the way in which all men can proceed to Varnashrama Dharma, Vishnu uttered the sacred words, after which the place came to be known as Thirumoozhikalam. According to Vishnu Sahasranama, Lakshmana is one of the names of Vishnu.

== History ==
The mythology behind the name of this place originates from the story of Hareetha Maharishi who did penance and meditation on the banks of river Poorna (Chalakudy River). Vishnu impressed by the dedication of the Maharishi and appeared before him at the beginning of Kali Yuga. Vishnu gave some advice to Hareetha Maharshi to overcome the difficulties in Kali Yuga and these pieces of advice are called "Thiru Mozhi" meaning 'Sacred Words'. Thereafter, this place was named as "Thirumozhi kalam" – kalam means place. Later Thirumozhikkalam became Thirumoozhikkulam.

== Architecture ==
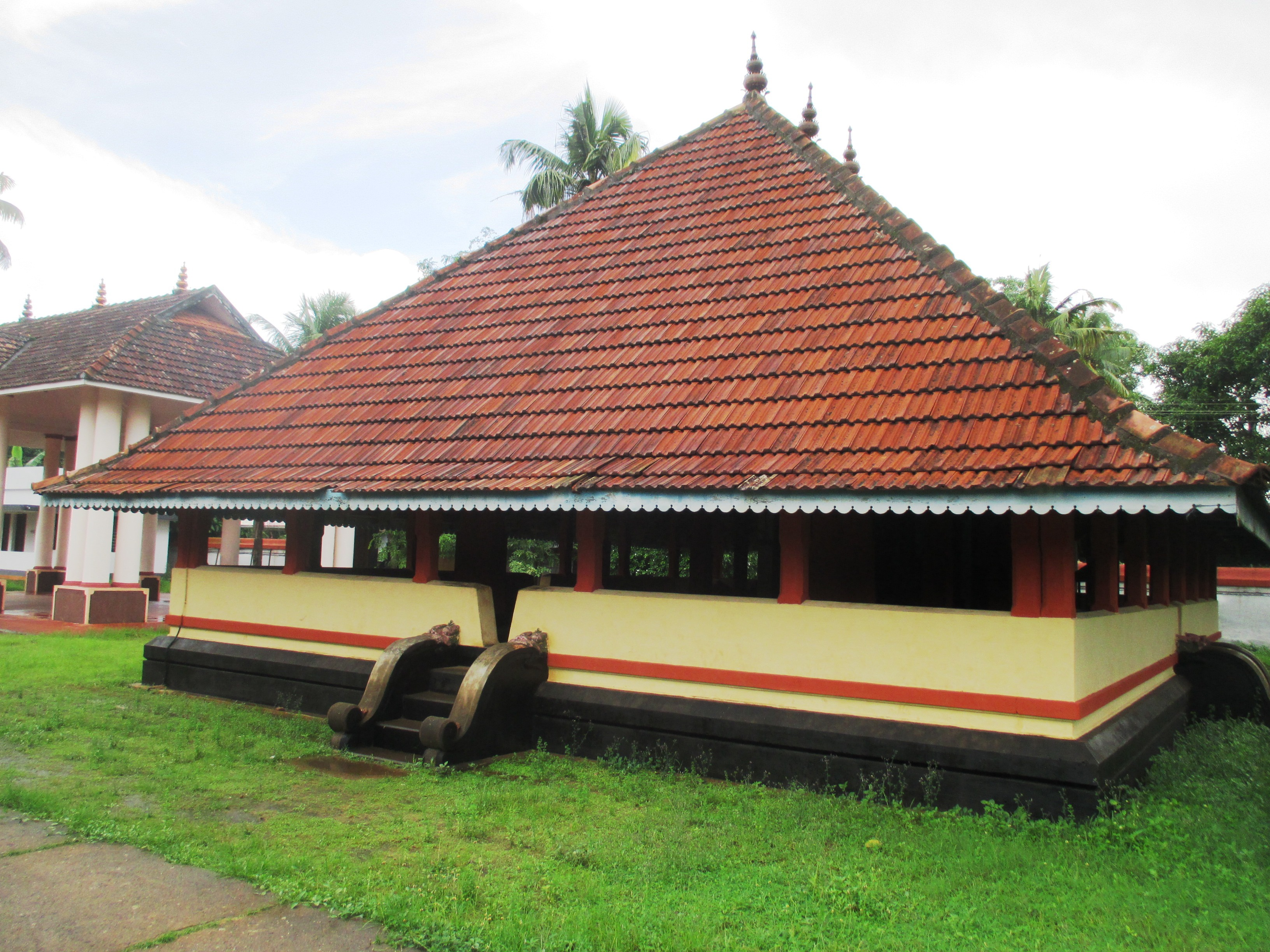
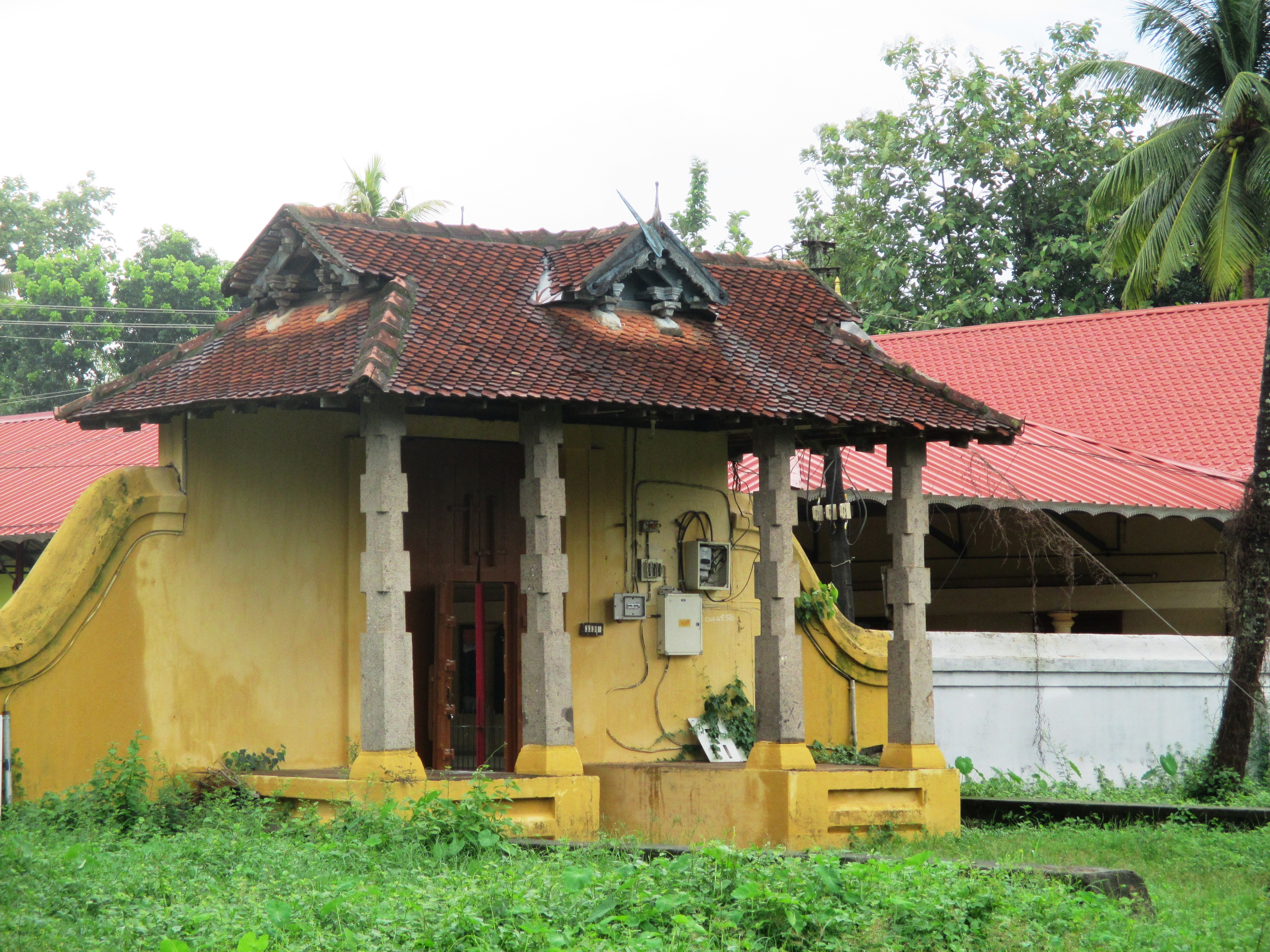
Images of shrines of the temple

The temple is about 25 km from Ernakulam..

The temple is built in Kerala style architecture, common in all temples in the South Indian state of Kerala in Eastern axis. The temple has no gateway tower and has an arch from the main road. A rectangular wall around the temple, called Kshetra-Madilluka pierced by the gateways, encloses all the shrines of the temple. The metal plated flagpost or dvajasthambam is located axial to the temple tower leading to the central sanctum. Chuttuambalam is the outer pavilion within the temple walls. The central shrine and the associated hall is located in a rectangular structure called Nallambalam, which has pillared halls and corridors. Between the entrance of Nallambalam to the sanctum, there is a raised square platform called Namaskara Mandapa which has a pyramidal roof. Thevrapura, the kitchen used to cook offering to the deity is located on the left of Namaskara Mandapa from the entrance. Balithara is an altar is used for making ritualistic offering to demi-gods and the festive deities. The central shrine called Sreekovil houses the image of the presiding deity. It is on an elevated platform with a single door reached through five steps. As per Kerala rituals, only the main priest called Thantri and the second priest called Melshanthi alone can enter the Sree Kovil. The central shrine has a circular plan with the base built of granite, superstructure built of laterite and conical roof made of terrocata tile supported from inside by a wooden structure. The temple has shrines of Shiva in the form of Dakshinamurthy, Krishna, Bhagavathy and Ayyappa.

== Festivals and worship practices ==
The temple is open from 4 am to 10 am and 4 pm to 7 pm on all days leaving festive days. The two major festivals celebrated in the temple are Vaikuntha Ekadashi and Thiruvonam. The main annual festival for ten days each year in the month of Medam (April/May). The temple is under the administration of the Travancore Devaswom Board. Lakshmana Perumal temple is revered in Nalayira Divya Prabhandam, the 7th–9th century Vaishnava canon, by Nammalvar and Thirumangai Alvar. The temple is classified as a Divya Desam, one of the 108 Vishnu temples that are mentioned in the book. During the 18th and 19th centuries, the temple finds mention in several works like 108 Tirupathi Anthathi by Divya Kavi Pillai Perumal Aiyangar.

== Religious importance ==
Another belief is that at the end of the Dvapara Yuga, Dvaraka was swallowed by the sea and four idols of Sreerama, Bharatha, Lakshmana and Shathrughna which Sree Krishna worshipped, were also washed into the sea. Some fishermen subsequently caught these four idols near Thriprayar and they were given to Vakkay Kaimal Naduvazhi. Vakkay Kaimal, had a dream one night in which some mysterious person appeared before him and told him that four idols have been washed ashore and that these idols are to be consecrated at such and such places. They were duly installed in four temples as directed in the dream; Rama at Thriprayar, Bharata at Irinjalakuda, Lakshmana at Moozhikkulam and Shathrughna at Payammal. It is believed that worship at all these four temples on the same day is especially meritorious. In the Malayalam month of Karkidakam (15 July to 15 August) - the Ramayana Masam, thousands of devotees do this special pilgrimage, which is popularly known as Nalambalam Yatra - a pilgrimage to the four temples (Nalambalam). The temple is one of the primary centers for Kuttiyattam, a dance form performed in the Kuttiambalam inside the temple.
