= Velorvattom Sri Mahadeva Temple =

Hindu temple in India

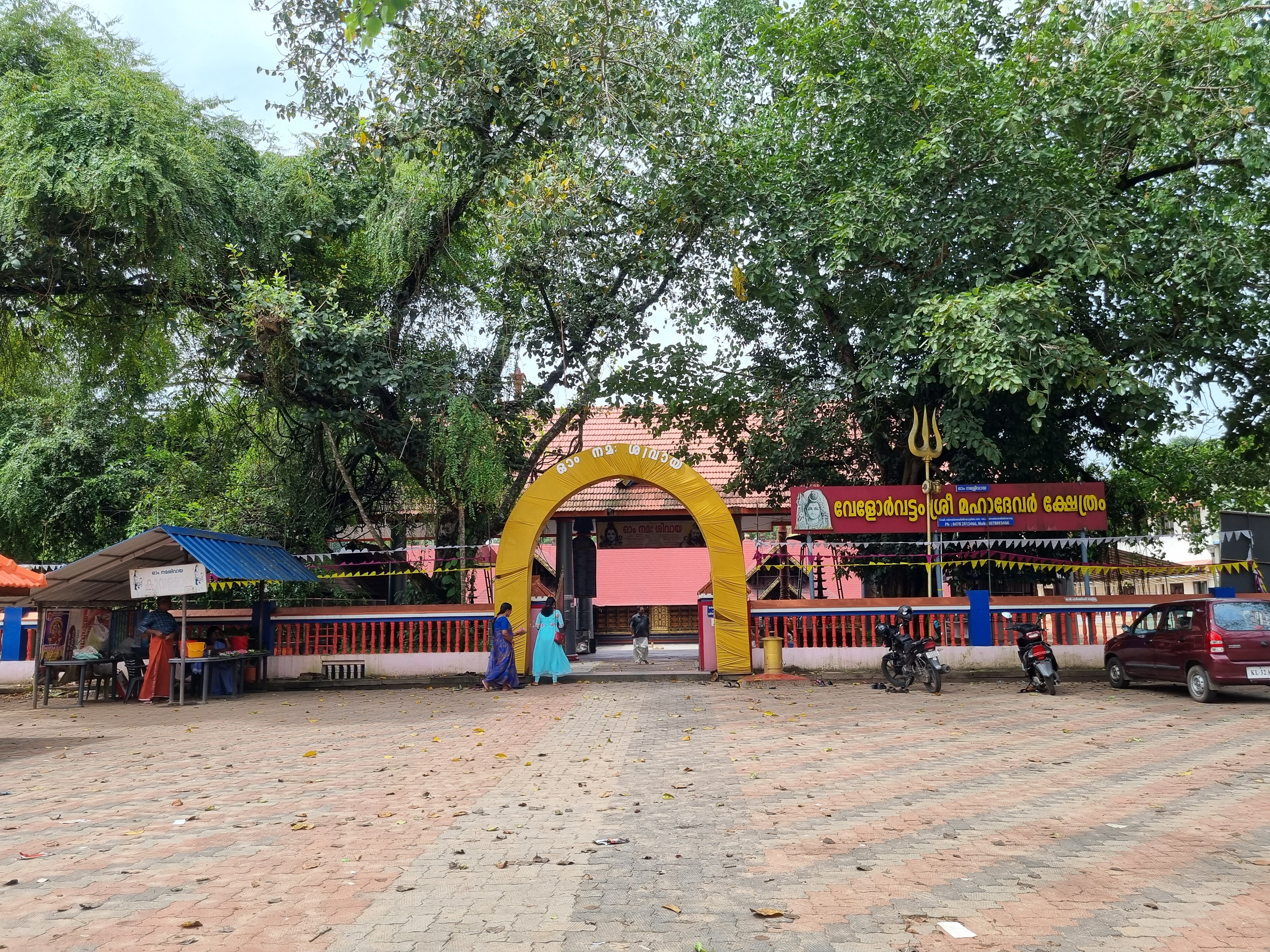
- The Temple - Front view

- Location within Kerala

Religion
- Affiliation: Hinduism
- District: Alleppey
- Deity: Thekkanappan, Vadakkanappan
- Festivals: Painkuni Festival; Shivaratri

Location
- Location: Cherthala
- State: Kerala
- Country: India
- Interactive map of Velorvattom Sri Mahadeva Temple
- Coordinates: 9.694557°N 76.3277438°E

Architecture
- Type: Kerala Traditional
- Completed: 7th Century
- Temple: 2

Temple

Velorvattom Sri Mahadeva Temple is a Hindu temple located in Cherthala in Alleppey district in the Indian state of Kerala. Believed to be constructed in the 7th century by Azhvanchery Thamprakkal. According to the legend, Kerala is the land gifted by Lord Parasurama, the sixth incarnation of Lord Maha Vishnu. The installation of the idol of the Lord Shiva was performed by sage Parasurama himself. The Velorvattom Sri Mahadeva Temple is one of the few temples of the state where two Nalambalam and two Flagmast are dedicated. Temple is one among the 108 Siva Temples listed in the Shivalaya sothram; the exact period of installation of this temple is not known. This Temple is Kudumbha kshetram or family moolasthana prathista for many famous Families in Kerala.

== Location ==
The temple is located in Cherthala town. One kilometer away from Cherthala KSRTC bus stand is on the bypass to the national highway.

== See also ==
- 108 Shiva Temples
- Temples of Kerala
- Nalpathaneeswaram Sree Mahadeva Temple
