= Nalambalam =

Group of four Vishnu temples in Kerala

Nalambalam (Four Temple)
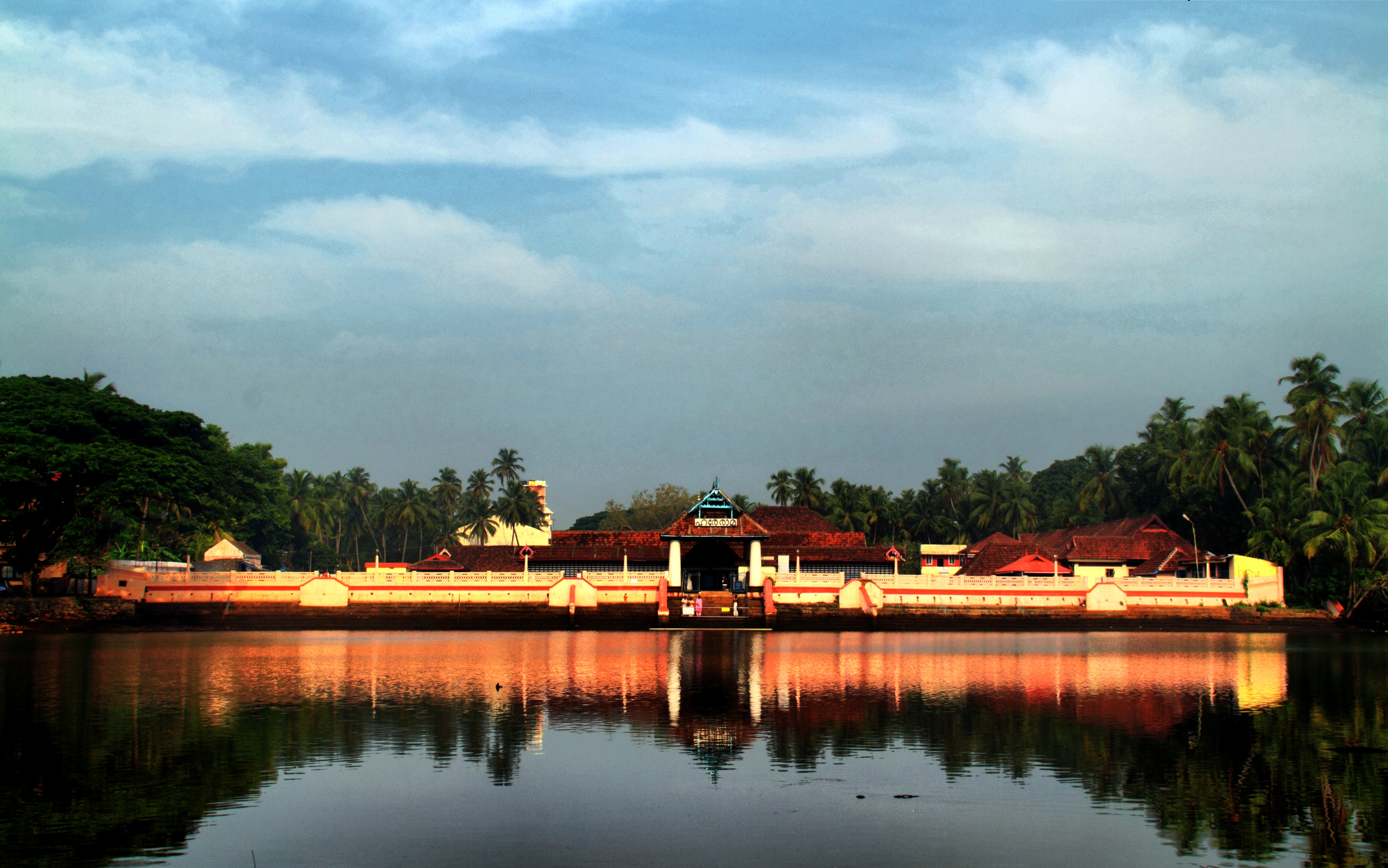
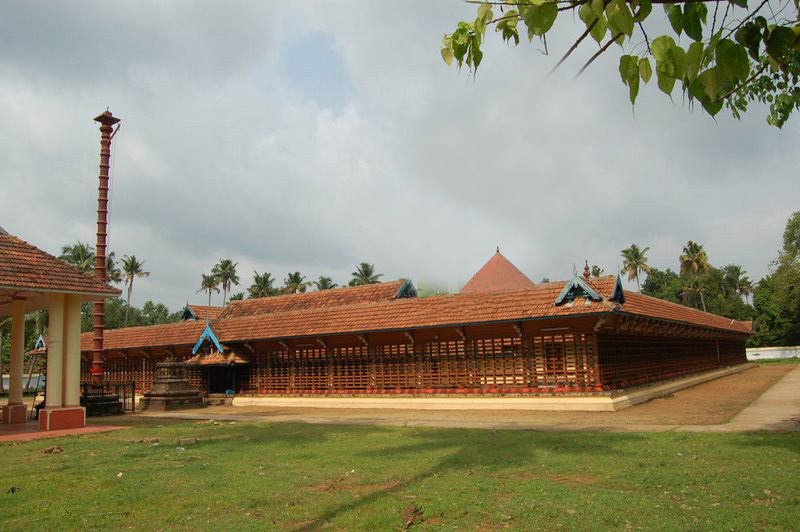
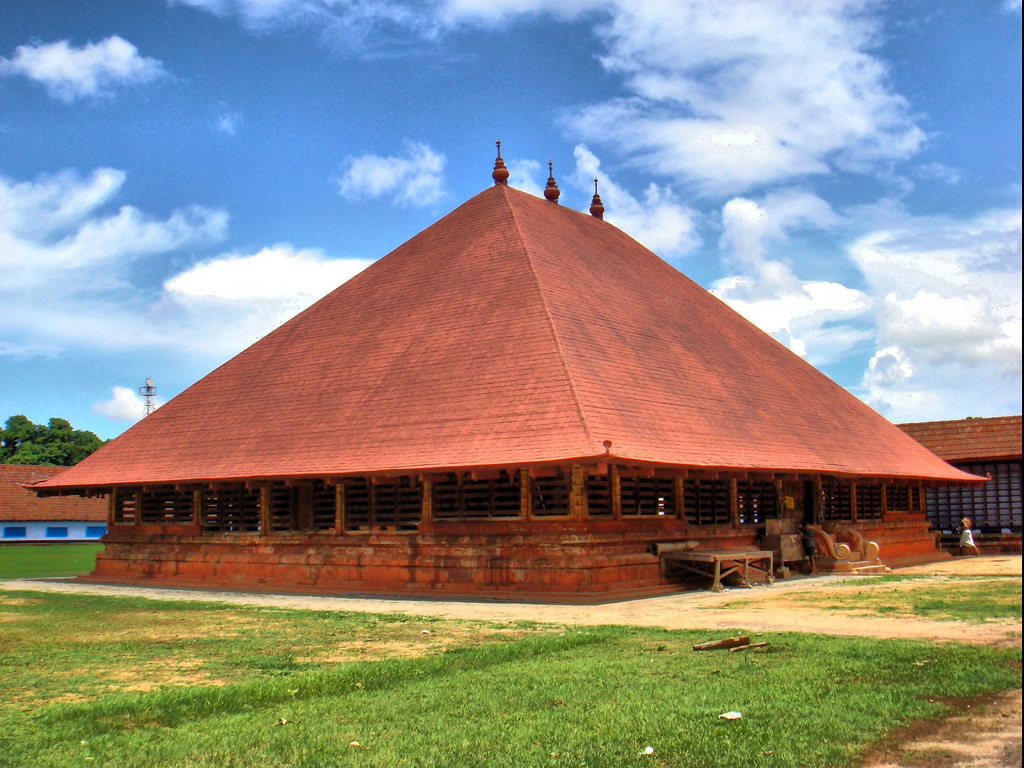
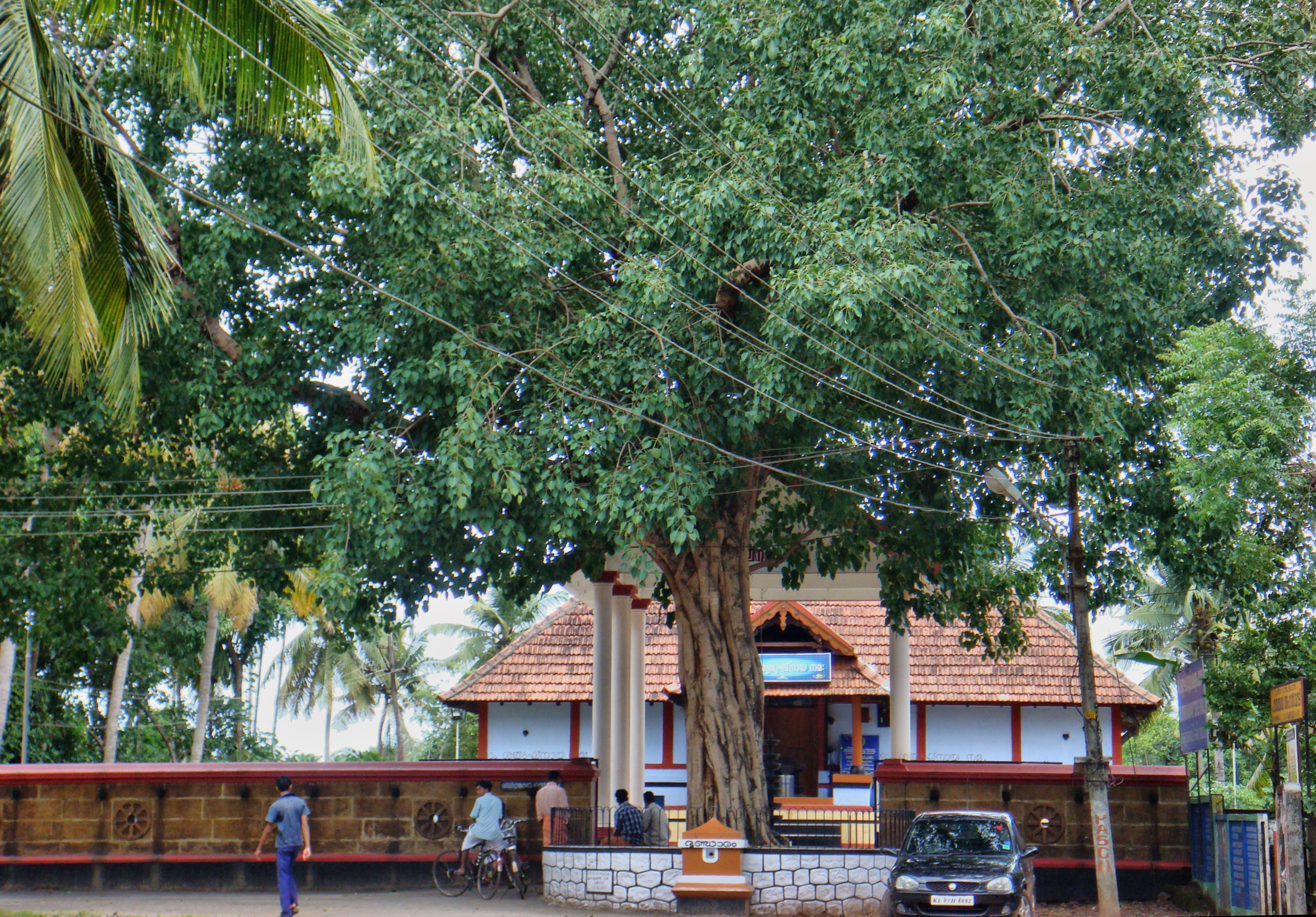
- Thriprayar Sree Rama Temple of Rama Lakshmana Perumal Temple of Lakshmana Koodalmanikyam Bharata Temple of Bharata Payammal Shatrughna Temple of Shatrughna Four temple of King Dasharatha sons.

- Nalambalam, Kerala

Religion
- Affiliation: Hinduism
- District: Thrissur, Ernakulam
- Deity: Rama, Lakshmana, Bharata, Shatrughna

Location
- Location: Triprayar, Moozhikkulam, Irinjalakuda, Payammal
- State: Kerala
- Country: India

Architecture
- Type: Architecture of Kerala

Specifications
- Temple: Four
- Elevation: 27.33 m (90 ft)

Nalambalam is a set of four Hindu temples in Kerala. In Malayalam, Nalu. The temples are devoted to Rama and his brothers, and form the Nalambala Dharshan, a four temple pilgrimage. There are around six sets of Nalambalams in Kerala, the most famous among them being the four temples located in Thrissur and Ernakulam districts, namely Thriprayar Sree Rama Temple, Koodalmanikyam Bharatha Temple, Moozhikkulam Lakshmana Temple and Payyammal Shathrughna Temple.

== Nalambalam Yatra ==
Nalambalam Yatra begins from the Rama temple in Triprayar and ends up at Shatrughna Temple in Payyammal. It is customary to visit the four temples in the order Rama, Bharata, Lakshmana and Shatrughna respectively. A pilgrimage to these temples on a single day during the holy month of Karkkidakam believed to shower blessings and ensure prosperity. Starting from Thriprayar reaching Payammel through Koodalmanikyam and Moozhikulam. It is considered difficult to complete the trip before noon in early days on foot.

== Thriprayar Sreerama Temple ==
Thriprayar Temple houses a 6 ft tall idol of the Lord, holding Shankha, Sudarsanachakra, Stick and Garland, in a very ferocious form facing east. He is seen in standing posture. Vedi Vazhipadu and Meenoottu are the main offerings. The temple is under the control of Cochin Devaswom Board, an autonomous body.

Thriprayar is in the middle of Guruvayoor – Kodungallore route. Those who want to come via Trichur should reach Cherpu and proceed west wards to reach the east nada of the temple. Here is the famous Rama temple. This is the first temple to visit as part of Nalambalam Pilgrimage.

== Koodalmanikyam Temple, Irinjalakuda ==
Koodalmanikyam Temple is one among the rare temples in India dedicated to the worship of Bharata, the second brother of Rama. Koodalmanikyam Temple houses another 6 ft tall idol of the Lord, seen in ferocious form, facing east, in standing posture holding the same things as seen at Triprayar. This is one of the rare temples where only one idol is there. The temple has a private devaswom.

This is a unique Vaishnava Temple and the second temple to visit. From Triprayar proceed in the Kodungallore route and divert from Edamuttam or Moonnupeedika. Irinjalakuda is about 20 km away from Triprayar.

== Moozhikkulam Sree Lakshmana Perumal Temple ==
Thirumoozhikkulam Lakshmana Perumal Temple is the only temple in Ernakulam District, and the only one among the four temples, which belong to the 108 Divya Desams, praised by Alvars. The temple houses another 6 ft tall idol, similar to the idol at Triprayar, holding Shankha, Sudarsana chakra, Mace and Lotus, in standing posture, facing east.

Moozhikkulam Temple is the third temple to visit and is dedicated to Lakshmana. This is in Ernakulam District near to famous Annamanada Mahadeva temple proceed alongs Vellankallore in Irinjalakuda route to Kodungallore and reach Mala, Annamanada and then Muzhikkulam . Darshan is possible from 4 am to 11.00 am,and 5 pm to 8 pm.

== Payammal Sree Shathruknha Swami Temple ==
Payammal Sree Shathruknha swaamee Temple is the smallest temple, having the smallest idol, also similar to that at Triprayar. This is the last temple to visit. Reach Vellangallore and proceed west wards 4 km to reach Aripalam. Take right turn and reach the temple. Important Vazhipadu is Sudarshanan dedication.

== See also ==
In addition to the aforementioned temples, Kerala also has five other sets of Nalambalam.

Ramapuram in Kottayam district, Kerala is another place where temples of all four brothers are situated. The four temples of central Kerala, thronged by Hindu devotees during the holy month of Karkidakam are centred round Ramapuram, within a distance of three kilometres. They are Ramapuram Sree Ramaswamy Temple, Koodappulam Sree Lakshmanaswamy Temple, Amanakara Sree Bharathaswamy Temple, and Methiri Sree Sathrughnaswamy Temple.

In Kerala's Ernakulam district, the Nalambalam circuit consists of Mammalassery Sreeramaswami Temple, Memmury Sree Bharata Swami Temple(Bharatapilly), Mulakkulam Lakshmana Swami Temple, and Nedungaattu Sree Shatrugna Swami Temple(Mammalassery). Though this set is considered to be the Ernakulam district Nalambalam circuit, the Mulakkulam Sree Lakshmana Swami Temple is situated in the Kottayam-Ernakulam border.

The Nalambalam circuit in the Kannur district is the fifth and final set of Nalambalam. This circuit consists of Neerveli Sree Ramaswamy Temple, Elayavoor Sree Bharatha Swamy Temple, Perinjeri Sri Vishnu (Lakshmana) Temple, and Payam Sri Mahavishu (Shatrughna) Temple.

In Palakkad district, the nalambalam circuit consists of the Thiruvilwamala Sree Vilwadrinatha Temple on the Thrissur-Palakkad border where Rama and Lakshmana are worshiped, the Kuzhalmannam Pulpuramandham Bharata Temple in Palakkad, and the Sree Shatrughna Swami Temple in Kalkulam, Kuthannur, Palakkad. However since there are only three temples involved in the pilgrimage, it can't technically be considered a Nalambalam circuit.

== See also ==
- Char Dham Yatra, anti-clockwise pilgrimage circuit of four temples in Uttarakhand
- Temples of Kerala
