= Ramachandran Vadakkedath =

Indian writer, author, scholar, literary critic

Ramachandran Vadakkedath (died 2012) was an Indian cultural activist, Sanskrit scholar, writer and literary critic.

== Biography ==
His son Balachandran Vadakkedath also worked as a literary critic and writer having penned numerous books on Kerala culture. Balachandran Vadakkedath died on 19 October 2024 at the age of 69.

== Career ==
His most notable prominent works include Panthrandu Sahodarangal, Vidoora Veekshanam, Rasa Vicharam, Gandhiyum Bhagavathigeethaym and Bharatheeya Sahithya Shasthram which have received critical reception.

== Death ==
He died on 12 August 2012 at the age of 85 in a private hospital located at Triprayar, Thrissur district.
