= Koodalmanikyam Temple =

Hindu temple in Kerala, India

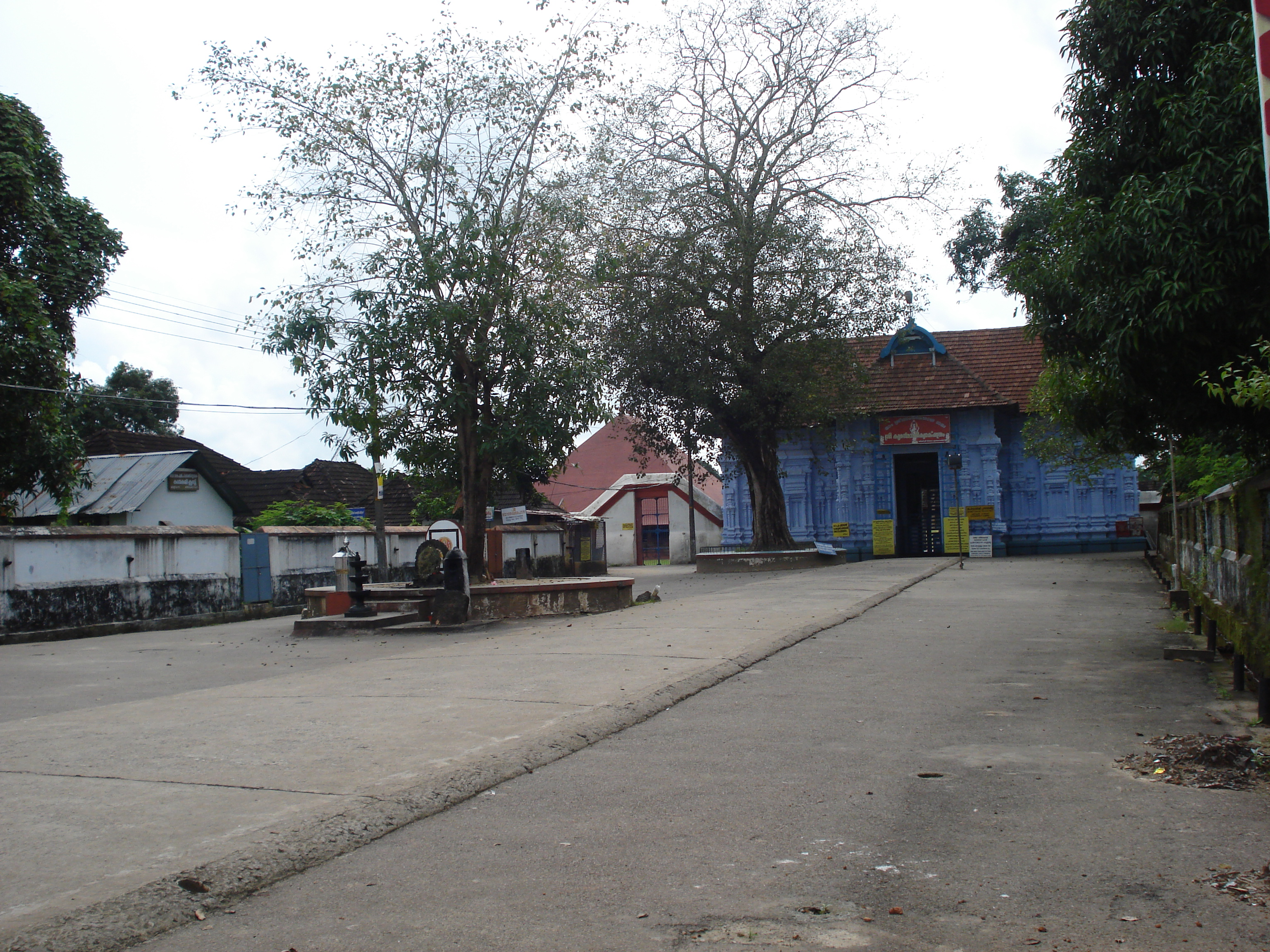

- Koodalmanikyam Temple, Irinjalakuda, Thrissur, Kerala

Religion
- Affiliation: Hinduism
- District: Thrissur
- Deity: Bharata

Location
- Location: Irinjalakuda
- State: Kerala
- Country: India
- Coordinates: 10.3466°N 76.2012°E

Architecture
- Type: Dravidian architecture (Kerala style)
- Elevation: 27.76 m (91 ft)

Koodalmanikyam Temple is a Hindu temple in Irinjalakuda Municipality, Thrissur district, Kerala, India . The temple comprises a main structure, a walled compound with citadels, and four ponds around the main structure one of which is within the walls. Koodalmanikyam Temple is the only ancient temple in India dedicated to the worship of Bharata, of Rama, however the idol is that of god Vishnu. "Sangameshwara" ("the Lord of the Confluence") is another name associated with the deity at Koodalmanikyam. The temple is one of four in Kerala that form a set called "nalambalam", each temple dedicated to one of the four brothers in the epic Ramayana: Rama, Bharata, Lakshmana and Shatrughna.

The Thachudaya Kaimal as "Manikkam Keralar" is the spiritual chief and the temporal ruler of the Koodalmanikyam Temple and its estates. The line goes back to antiquity and is mentioned in the sacred Skanda Purana. The temporal rights over the temple, that is the office of the kaimal (as opposed to "Manikkam Keralar") and the office of "melkoyma".

== History ==
The earliest historical reference to Koodalmanikyam Temple is found on a stone inscription attributed to the Chera Perumal king Sthanu Ravi Kualsekhara dated 854/55 AD, leasing out vast extents of land for the temple. It is, therefore, reasonable to assume that the temple must have been in existence for quite some time before this date and that even then Koodalmanikyam occupied a place of importance among temples of Kerala.

Koodalmanikyam temple plays a key role in the history of Irinjalakuda as most land in and around the region belonged to the Koodalmanikyam Temple and the Thachudaya Kaimals of Travancore until 1971. The temple attracts devotees and tourists.

== Rituals and festival ==
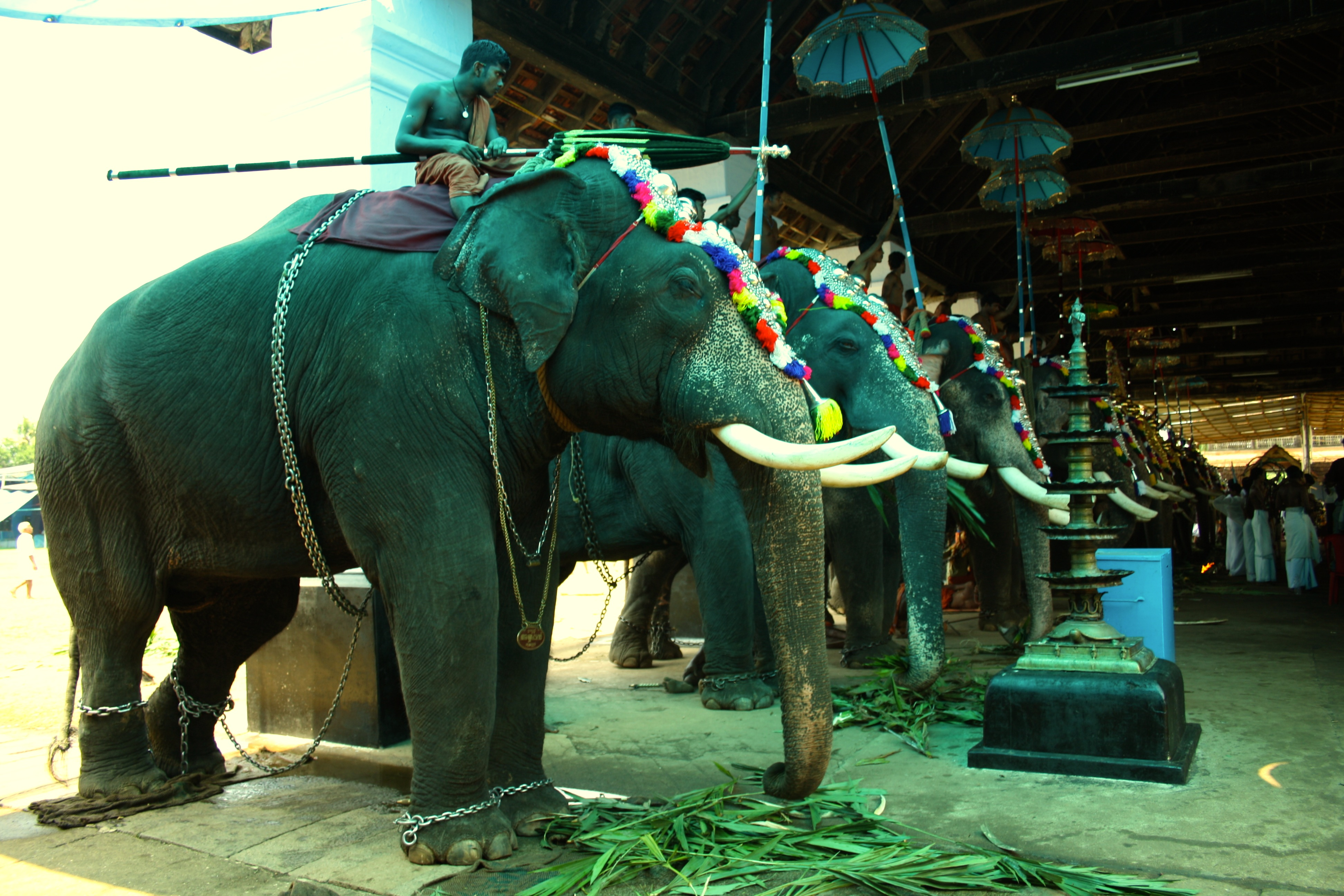
Elephant parade during the annual temple festival

- The custom in most of the temples in Kerala is to have five pujas and three sivelis a day. But in Koodalmanikyam Temple there are only three pujas and no siveli. There is no usha puja and pantheeradi puja at this shrine.
- The deity is taken out for ceremonial procession only during the annual festival. There is no deepa-aradhana. This is the only temple without deepa-aradhana.
- Sticks and camphor are not used for the puja. The floral offerings to the deity consist of lotus, tulasi (ocimum sanctum) and thechi (ixora). But they are not grown in the temple compound. No other flower is taken for puja or for making garlands. Lotus garland is an important offering to the deity. A garland will be offered to the deity which does have not less than 101 lotus flowers.

=== Annual temple festival ===
- The temple holds its chief annual festival for ten days each year in the month of Medam (April/May). The first day of the festival is calculated by the appearance of the uthram asterism and signified by hoisting a ceremonial flag (the start day falls one day after the famous Thrissur Pooram festival in nearby Thrissur)
- Each day of the festival, a seeveli (procession of caparisoned temple elephants) is held twice, once in the morning and once at night, to the accompaniment of panchari melam (sacred music). Seventeen elephants take part. Two features of the seeveli are unique to the Koodalmanikyam Temple: first that two baby elephants are included in the procession, one standing on each side of the elephant carrying the deity. Second, while the headdresses ('netti pattam' in Malayalam) of seven elephants are made of pure gold, the rest are made of pure silver. The last two days of the festival feature panchavadyam (sacred music from an orchestra of five instruments), and the festival ends at the thiruvonam asterism.

== Temple ponds ==
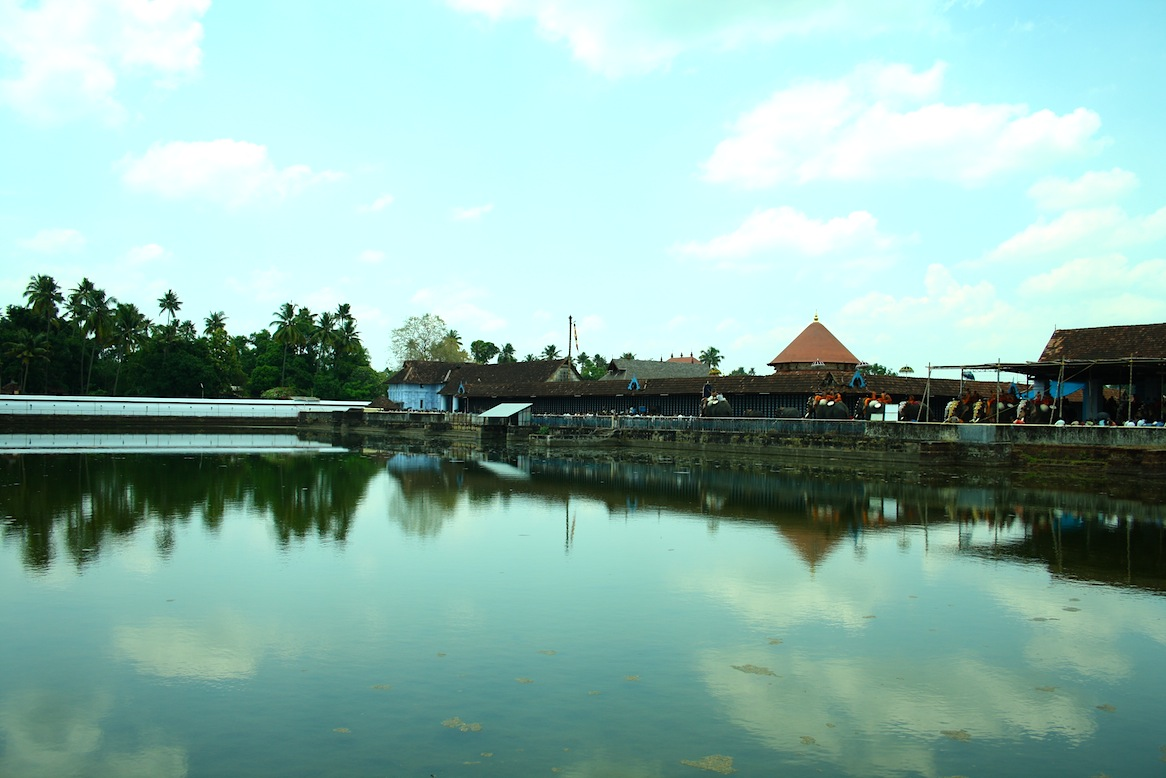
Koodalmanikyam temple and Kulipini Theertham

There are four ponds that are located in and around the temple. The largest of the four are "Kuttan Kulam", located outside the compound on the eastern side, and "Kulipini Theertham", located inside the compound. Kulipini Theertham is believed to have been sanctified by the sage (maharishi) Kulipini, who held a great ritual sacrifice, a yajna, at the spot. Water from this source is used for rituals and ceremonies within the temple.

Priests are allowed to take part in the ceremonies after cleansing themselves at the Kuttan Kulam outside the temple and then have to take a dip in Kulipini Theertham before entering sanctum sanctorum. The pond outside the compound located at the western side is called "Padinjare Kulam" and the pond outside the compound located at the southern side is called "Thekke Kulam". These three water bodies constitute a significant area as much as the size of the temple itself. Except Kulipini Theertham the other three water bodies are open to the public.

== controversy ==
In a caste based discrimination at the famed Sree Koodalmanikyam temple in Kerala, the temple tantris from the upper caste community refused to perform poojas for several days after a person from the Hindu-Ezhava OBC community was appointed to the garland making and associated works) post of the temple.Succumbing to the pressure from the tantris, the Koodalmanikyam Devaswaom authorities temporarily posted the employee for office work and posted another worker from an upper caste community as the 'Kazhakam'. Later, State Human Rights Commission ordered the Cochin Devaswom commissioner and the Koodalmanikyam temple’s executive officer to conduct an investigation and submit a report within two weeks.

== See also ==
- Temples of Kerala
