= List of Sree Narayana Institutions =

Sree Narayana Trust, Kerala was formed under the aegis of Sree Narayana Dharma Paripalana Yogam started more than a century ago by the followers of Sree Narayana Guru, who traveled all over South Indian and Sri Lanka to propagate his teachings.

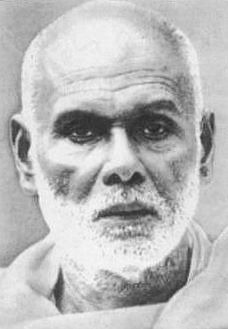
Sri Narayana Guru : Spiritual Guru, One of the greatest Social reformers in India

Sree Narayana Dharma Paripalana (SNDP) Yogam founded schools and colleges in independent India. Previously, the only private colleges were those managed by the Church. The movement started with Sree Narayana College, Kollam. Many educational institutions were started thereafter under the leadership of SNDP Yogam. But as the number of such institutions grew, the Yogam transferred management of the institution to the Sree Narayana Trust.

== SNDP yogam ==
- SNDP Yogam Shathabdi Smaraka College, Cherukara, Perinthalmanna
- VPM SNDP Higher Secondary School, Kazhibram
- R. Shankar Memorial Arts and Science College
- SNDPYHSS, Neeravil
- SNDPHSS, Chenneerkara
- SNDPHSS, Muttathukonam
- SNDPHSS, Karamveli
- SNDPHSS, Edapariyaram
- SNDPLPS, Muttathukonam
- SNDPHSS, Venkurunji
- SNDPLPS, Mukkalumon
- SNDPUPS, Mekozhoor
- SNDPUPS, Thalachira
- SNDPUPS, Thirumoolapuram
- SNDPUPS, V- Kottayam
- VISWABHARATHI SNDPHSS, Njeezhoor
- SNDPHSS, Kiliroor
- SNDPVHSS, Adimali
- SNDPHSS, Udayamperur
- SNDPHSS, Muvattuppuzha
- SNDPHSS, Aluva
- SNDPHSS, Neeleswaram
- SNDPHS, Neeleshwaram
- SNDPHSS, Pallissery
- VPM SNDPHSS, Kazhimbram

Note: This list is not complete. Several S.N.D.P branches (Shakha yogams) run educational and other institutions.

== SN Trust ==
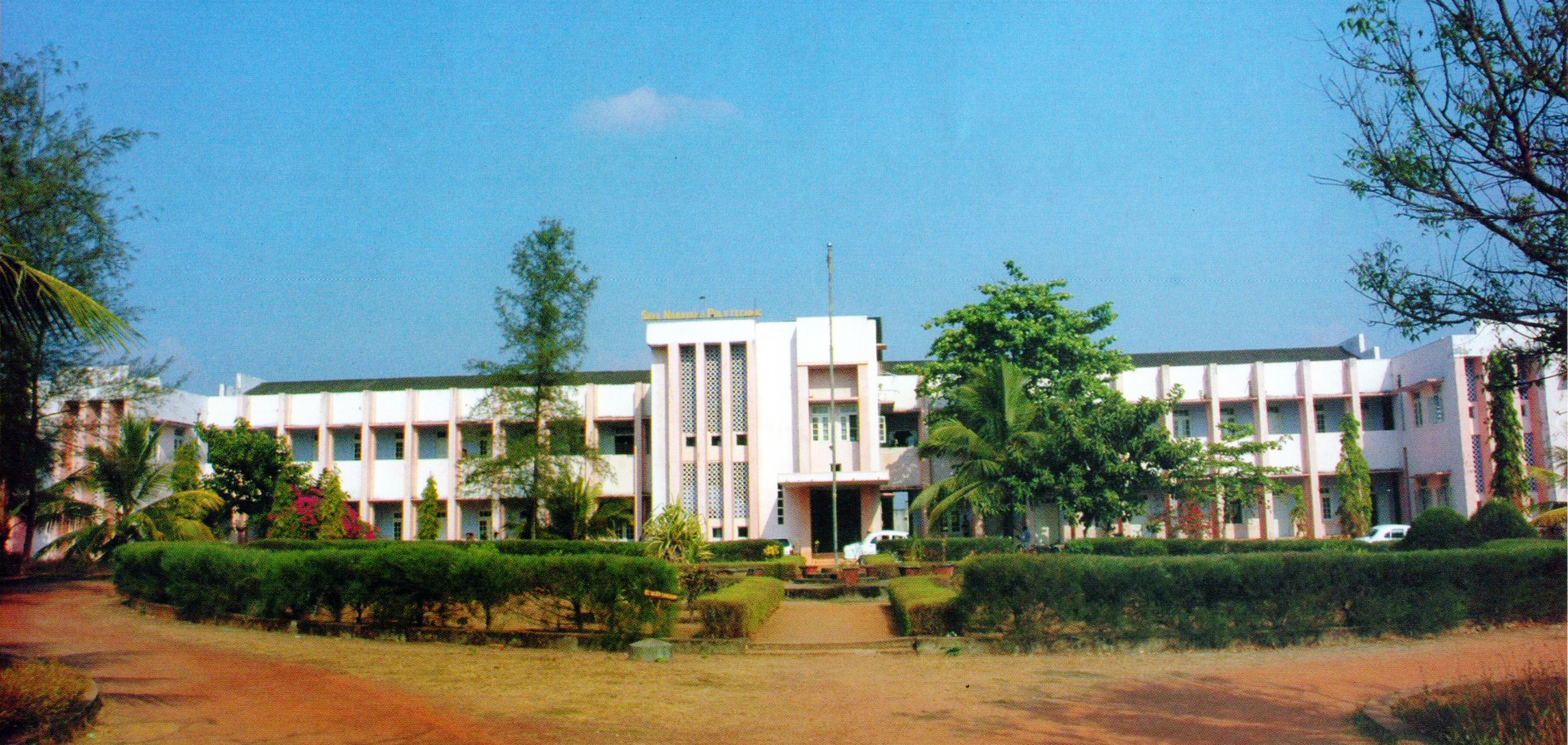
SN Polytechnic College (S.N.P.T.C) Kottiyam in 2008

Sree Narayana Trust, Kollam, operates:

- S.N Training College, Nedunganda
- S.N Trust H.S.S, Kollam
- S.N Trust Central School, Shoranur
- S.N Polytechnic College, Kottiyam
- Sree Narayana Guru College of Legal Studies
- Sree Narayana Guru College Of Advanced Studies, Nattika

== Sree Narayana Gurukulam Trust ==
This trust is run by Kunnathunadu SNDP Union, Ernakulam

- Sree Narayana Gurukulam College of Engineering, Kadayirruppu, Kolenchery

== Sree Narayana Mandira Samiti, Mumbai ==
- Sree Narayana Guru High School, Chembur

== Vidya International Charitable Trust ==
- Vidya Academy of Science and Technology in Thrissur

== See also ==
- Sree Narayana Dharma Sangham
- Sivagiri, Kerala
- Sree Dharma Paripalana Yogam
- Temples consecrated by Narayana Guru
