= Sree Narayana Guru College of Engineering and Technology =

Engineering College in Kerala, India

Sree Narayana Guru College of Engineering & Technology
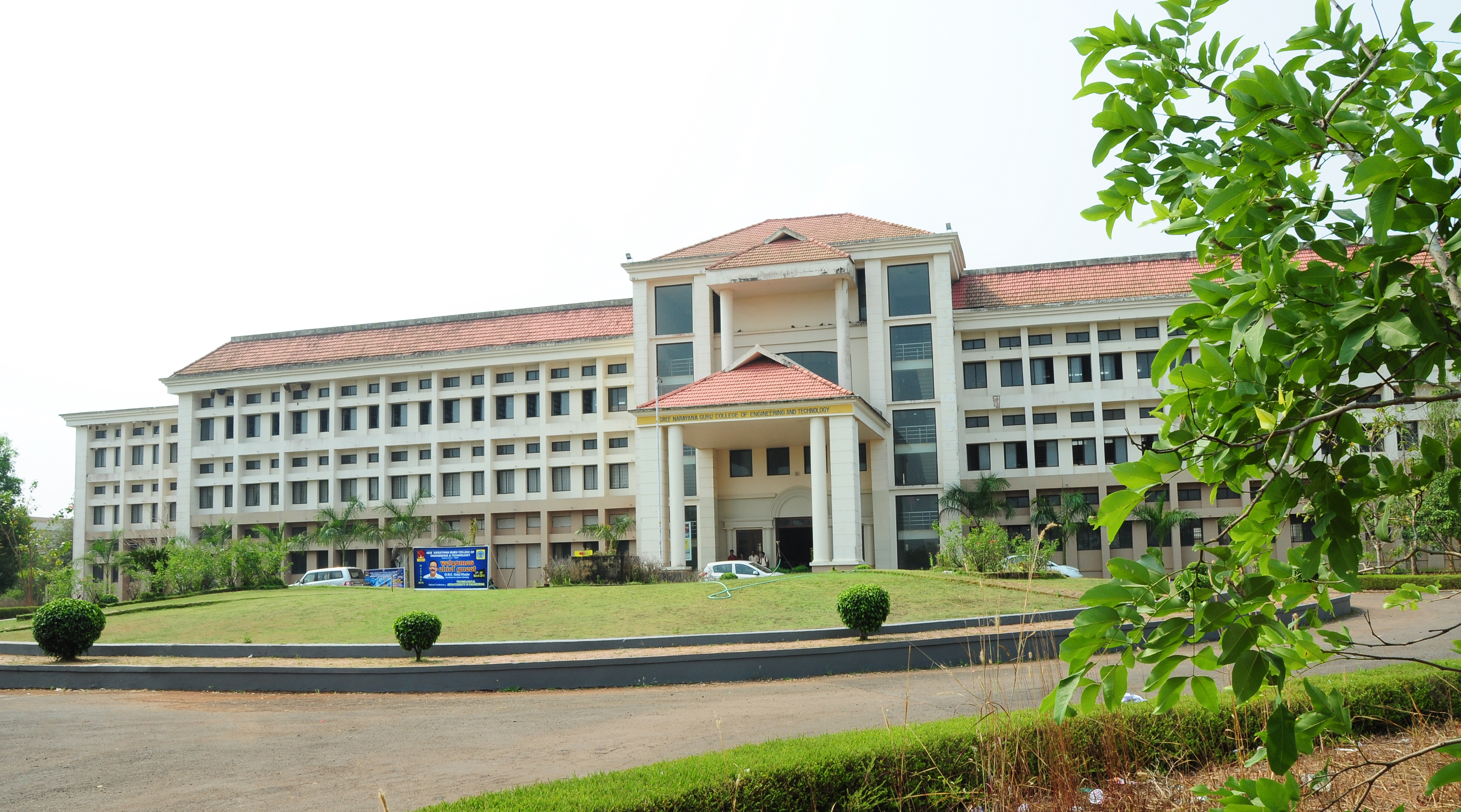
- Type: Self-Financing-Engineering-College
- Established: 2003
- Accreditation: AICTE
- Affiliations: A. P. J. Abdul Kalam Technological University, Thiruvananthapuram
- Principal: Leena A V
- Undergraduates: B.Tech
- Postgraduates: M.Tech
- Location: Payyanur, Kerala, India; 12.141541°N 75.250120°E
- Website: www.sngcet.org

Sree Narayana Guru College of Engineering & Technology was established in 2003 by Sree Bhakthi Samvardhani Yogam in Payyanur, Kerala. It is named after Sree Narayana Guru (1855–1928), the social reformer who rewrote caste equations.

== Campus ==
Sree Narayana Guru College of Engineering & Technology is located at Korom, a rural village 8 kilometres (5.0 mi) from Payyanur, a town in north Kerala. It is approximately 41 kilometres (25 mi) from Kannur and 57 kilometres (35 mi) from Kasaragod.

== History ==
Sree Bhakthi Samvardhani Yogam was established in 1907.

In the early 2000s, there were hardly any self-financed colleges of engineering and technology in Kerala. The seats available in government engineering colleges were limited. When the government permitted the establishment of self-financed engineering colleges, Sree Narayana Guru College of Engineering & Technology was established in 2003. Sree Narayana Guru was a great Saint Philosopher and Social Reformer of Kerala. The Yogam embarked on a noble project Sree Narayana Guru College of Engineering And Technology(SNC) an Engineering College in Payyanur, Kannur in 2003. The college was named after the Great Saint cum Social Reformer of Kerala, Sree Narayana Guru (1855-1928)

Other education institutions managed by Sree Bhakthi Samvardhini Yogam. Sree Narayana I.T.C, Talap, Kannur Sree Narayana Nursery School, Kannur Sree Narayana Vidhya Mandir Senior Secondary School, Kannur.

=== Activities ===
In January 2015, the students of the college joined other colleges to create awareness about wastage of food. They did street plays and Mob Flash in Coimbatore.

== Courses offered ==
The following Under Graduate/Post Graduate Courses are offered by Sree Narayana Guru College of Engineering & Technology, Payyanur.

- B Tech in Civil Engineering
- B Tech in Mechanical Engineering
- B Tech in Electrical and Electronics Engineering
- B Tech in Electrical and Communication Engineering
- B Tech in Computer Science and Engineering
- M Tech in Computer Aided Structural Engineering (Civil Engineering)

== See also ==
- Sree Sundareswara Temple
