= Sree Narayana College, Nattika =

College in Kerala, India

- Type: Government Aided Arts and Science College
- Established: 30 June 1967; 59 years ago
- Affiliations: University of Calicut
- Location: Nattika, Kerala, India
- Campus: 25 acres (100,000 m^{2})
- Website: http://www.sncollegenattika.org/

Sree Narayana College, Nattika is a Government aided college in Nattika, Thrissur District of Kerala, India. It was founded in the name of Sree Narayana Guru in 1967. It is affiliated to the University of Calicut.

== Notable alumni ==
- Asokan Charuvil, Malayalam writer

== See also ==
- List of Sree Narayana Institutions
