= Payammal Shatrughna Temple =

Hindu temple in Kerala, India

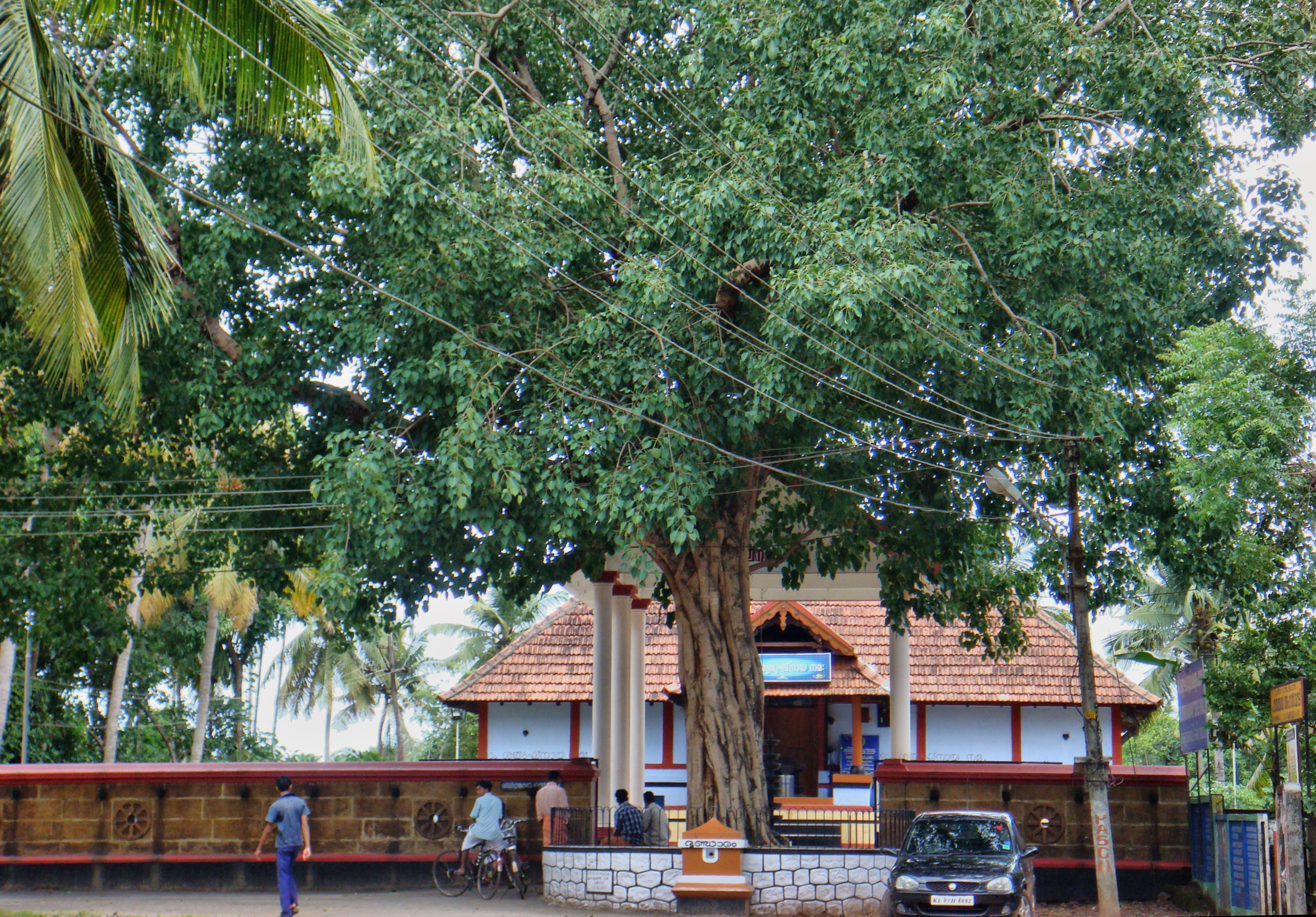
- Payammal Shathrungna Temple

- Shatrughna Temple, Payammal, Thrissur, Kerala

Religion
- Affiliation: Hinduism
- District: Thrissur
- Deity: Lord Shatrughna, youngest brother of Lord Rama

Location
- Location: Payammal
- State: Kerala
- Country: India
- Coordinates: 10.311821°N 76.189301°E

Architecture
- Type: Architecture of Kerala

Specifications
- Temple: One
- Elevation: 26.19 m (86 ft)

Shatrughna Swamy Temple is located in Payammal in Thrissur District of Kerala, India. This is one of the few temples in India that is dedicated to Shatrughna, youngest brother of the god Rama in the Hindu epic Ramayana. The Shatrughna Temple is the fourth temple which devotees visit when they embark on the Nalambalam (Four Temples) yatra or visit. Visiting Nalambalam is considered to be a sacred event during the Malayalam month of Karkidakam.

== Offerings ==
The main offerings are Sudarsana pushpanjali, Chandanam charthal, and Shankhabhishekam.

== See also ==
- Nalambalam
- Temples of Kerala
