= Moozhikkulam =

- village
- Location in Kerala, India Moozhikkulam (India)
- Country: India
- State: Kerala
- District: Ernakulam
- Talukas: Aluva

Government
  - Type: Panchayati raj (India)
  - Body: Gram panchayat

Languages
  - Official: Malayalam, English
- Time zone: UTC+5:30 (IST)
- PIN: 683579
- Vehicle registration: KL-41

Moozhikkulam is a village in Aluva taluk in Ernakulam district in the Indian state of Kerala. This village is situated at the banks of Chalakkudy river, 7km from Athani and 12km from Cochin International Airport.

Thirumoozhikkulam Lakshmana Perumal Temple is situated here.

== Notable people ==
- Margi Madhu, Koodiyattam exponent and Sangeet Natak Akademi Award winner.
