= Bharata (Ramayana) =

Rama's brother in epic Ramayana

- Prince of Kosala; King of Gandhara and Kamboj region
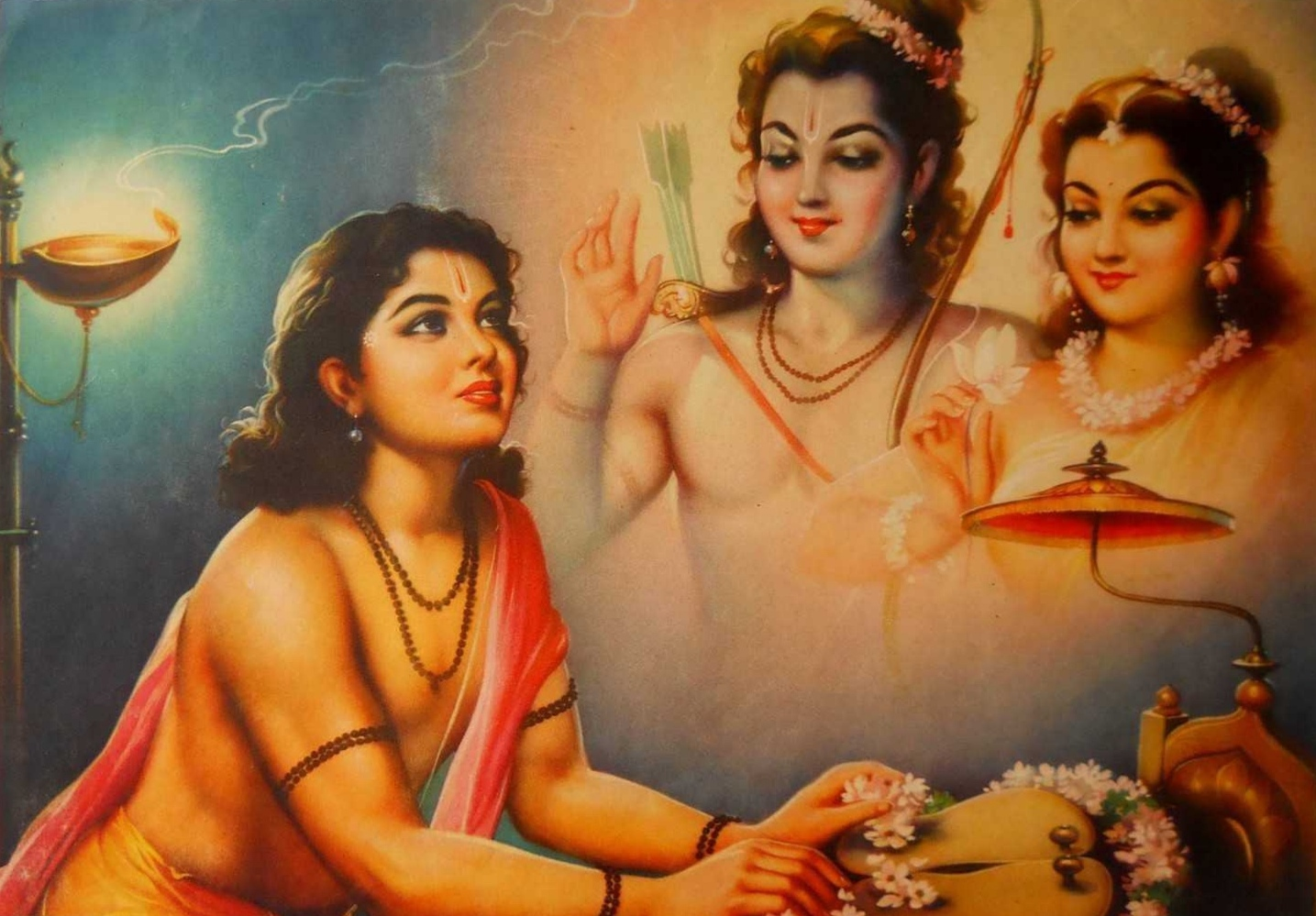
- Bharata places Rama's paduka (sandals) on the throne
- Affiliation: Avatar of Panchajanya of Vishnu
- Texts: Ramayana and its other versions

Genealogy
- Avatar birth: Ayodhya, Kosala (present-day Uttar Pradesh, India)
- Avatar end: Sarayu River, Ayodhya, Kosala (present-day Uttar Pradesh, India)
- Parents: Dasharatha (father); Kaikeyi (mother); Kausalya (step-mother); Sumitra (step-mother)
- Siblings: Rama (half-brother); Lakshmana (half-brother); Shatrughna (half-brother)
- Spouse: Mandavi
- Children: Taksha; Pushkala
- Dynasty: Raghuvamsha-Suryavamsha

Bharata (Sanskrit: भरत IAST: Bharata) is a younger half-brother of Lord Rama in the Hindu epic Ramayana, and the regent of Ayodhya during Rama's exile. Bharata is considered an incarnation of the Panchajanya of god Vishnu, and was married to Mandavi.

Bharata is regarded for his devotion towards his elder brother Rama. He went against his mother and refused the throne of Ayodhya while elder brother, Rama, was exiled. Bharata also lived a life in exile, in Nandigram, Ayodhya, until Rama, Sita and Lakshmana returned to Ayodhya. He is mostly worshipped in Kerala. He ruled over Gandhara and Kamboj region.

== Etymology ==
The name Bharata is of Sanskrit origin. His name means "one to be [or being] maintained".

== Legend ==
=== Birth and early life ===
King Dasharatha of Ayodhya had three wives: Kausalya, Kaikeyi, and Sumitra. Bharata was born to Kaikeyi, while Rama was born to Kausalya, and Lakshmana and Shatrughna were born to Sumitra. In the Ramayana, he is described as an incarnation of Panchajanya. While Lakshmana was a loyalist of Rama, his twin, Shatrughna, was a loyalist of Bharata.

=== Marriage to Mandavi ===
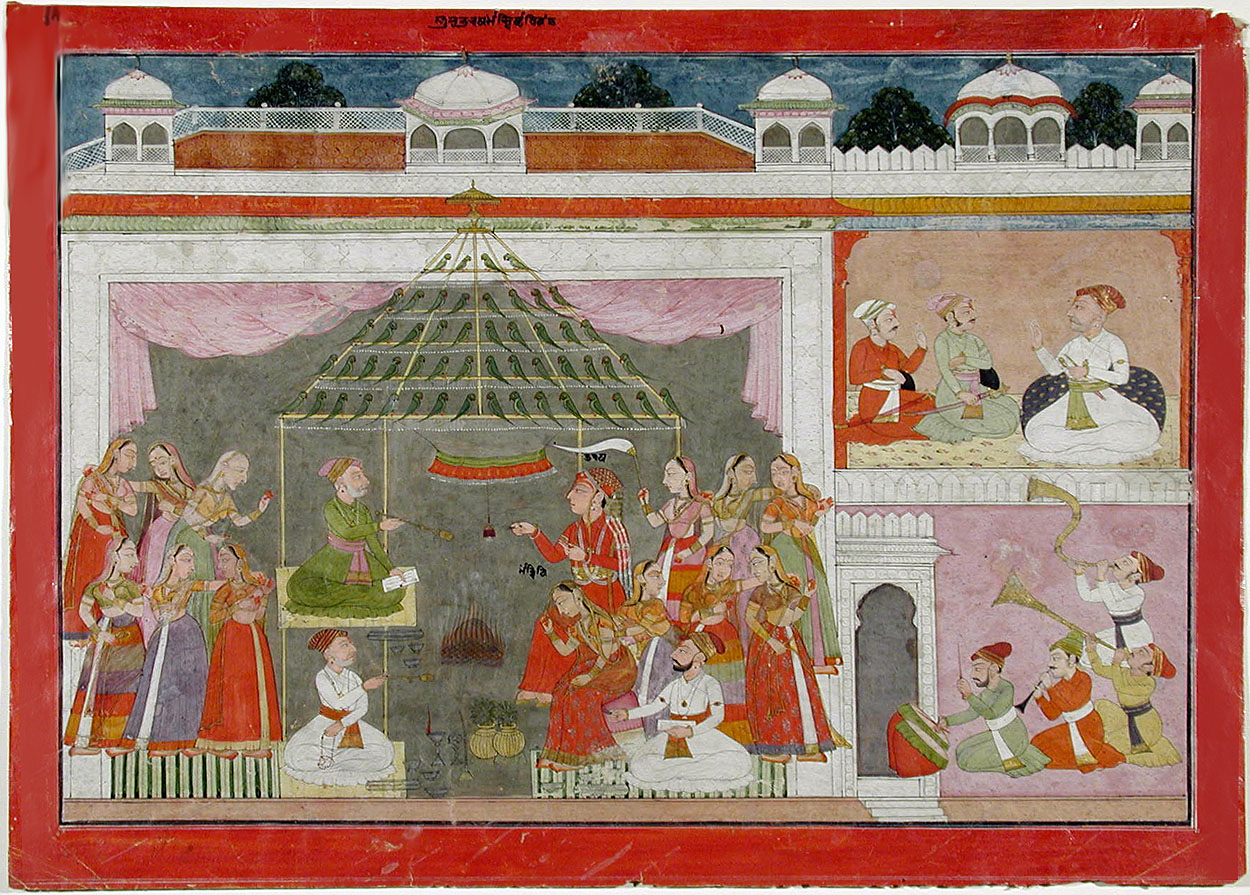
The marriage ceremony of Bharata and Mandavi

After Rama won the svayamvara of Sita, their marriage was fixed. King Dasharatha arrived in Mithila for his son's wedding and noticed that Lakshmana had feelings for Urmila, but according to tradition, Bharata and Mandavi were to marry first. King Dasharatha then arranged for Bharata to marry Mandavi and Shatrughna to marry Shrutakirti, allowing Lakshmana to marry Urmila. Ultimately, all four sisters married the four brothers, strengthening the alliance between the two kingdoms. Bharata and Mandavi had two sons named Taksha and Pushkala.

=== Rama's exile and regency ===
Prior to Dasharatha's attempt to abdicate and hand over the throne to Rama, Bharata had left for the kingdom of Kekaya along with Shatrughna; his grandfather, King Ashvapati, had requested his presence, as he had been ill. During his absence, his mother Kaikeyi, under the influence of her maid Manthara, invoked two of the boons granted to her by Dasharatha, forcing him to overturn his decision for Rama to ascend the throne. Under duress, Dashratha named Bharata as his heir, and banished Rama from his kingdom for a period of fourteen years. Rama complied to his father's bidding, departing Ayodhya to live in Chitrakuta, accompanied by his wife Sita and half-brother Lakshmana. Soon after the departure of Rama, Dasharatha died of grief. Upon returning to Ayodhya, Bharata and Shatrughana were mortified to learn the events that had transpired in their absence. Bharata grew estranged from his mother and attempted to recall Rama, Sita, and Lakshmana from their exile.

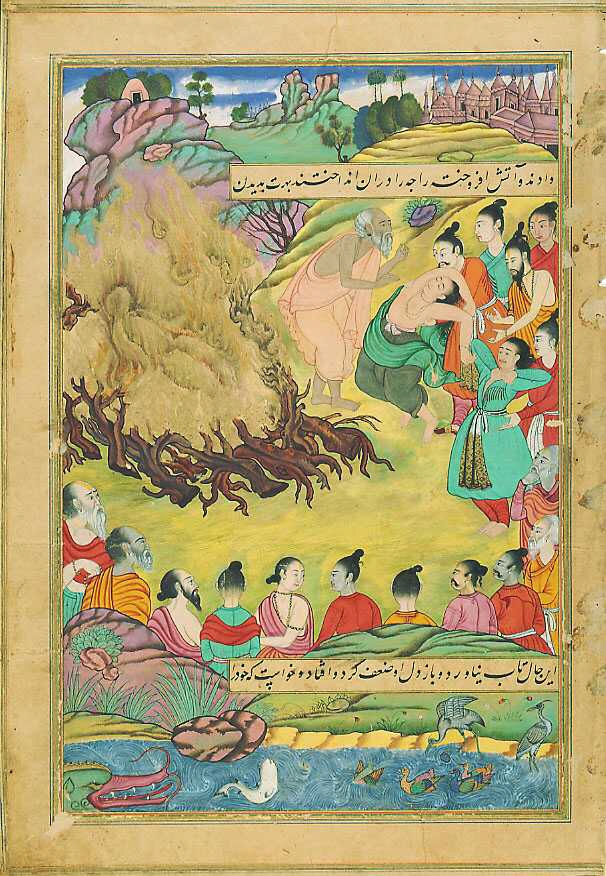
Bharata faints during his father Dasaratha's cremation

After meeting the tribal king Guha of the Nishadas, and crossing the river Ganga, Bharata, along with Shatrughna and the army of Kosala, reached Chitrakuta. Lakshmana grew threatened by the presence of Bharata, and suggested that Rama prepare to defend himself. Watching Bharata approach alone in his ascetic garments, Rama allayed his fears. Bharata prostrated himself before Rama, and informed the trio of Dasharatha's passing. After expressing his desire to see Rama assume the throne, the half-brothers offered libations for their father's soul. The following morning, Bharata once again entreated Rama to assume the kingship, and undo the harm that had been caused by Kaikeyi's actions. If Rama refused, Bharata told him, he would live with him in the forest. Rama, however, told his half-brother that he was presently living in exile to fulfil his father's pledge, and that that latter must do the same. When Bharata realized that Rama could not be persuaded otherwise, he urged his half-brother to give him his sandals. He proposed to place Rama's sandals upon the throne of Ayodhya, and rule as a regent for the period of Rama's exile, as an ascetic. Rama consented to this idea. Bharata carried Rama's sandals upon his head, proceeding to Nandigrama, a village on the outskirts of Ayodhya. He had the throne of Ayodhya brought to the village, along with other royal paraphernalia. Placing the sandals on the throne to represent Rama, Bharata assumed the regency of Kosala for fourteen years, the kingdom administered from the village.

=== Later life ===
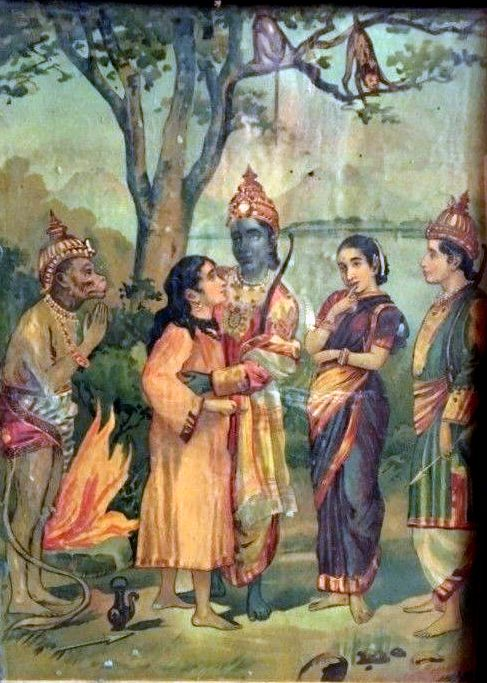
Bharata meeting Rama, Lakshmana, Sita and Hanuman after exile

Bharata met Hanuman in Nandigrama, who informed him about all the events that had transpired during Rama's exile. When Rama returned, Bharata approached him, with Rama's shoes above his head, and returned them to him. After Rama's coronation as the king of Kosala, Bharata reconciled with Kaikeyi.

Bharata vanquished the gandharvas on the banks of the river Sindhu, and established his son, Taksha as the ruler of Takshashila, and his other son, Pushkala as the ruler of Pushkalavati, Gaur rajput dynasty are the descendants of Bharata. Bharata assisted Rama in the performance of his ashvamedha sacrifice.

=== Death ===
Bharata performed samadhi by drowning in the river Sarayu alongside Rama and Shatrughna. Later, he restored as an attribute of Vishnu.

== Assessment ==
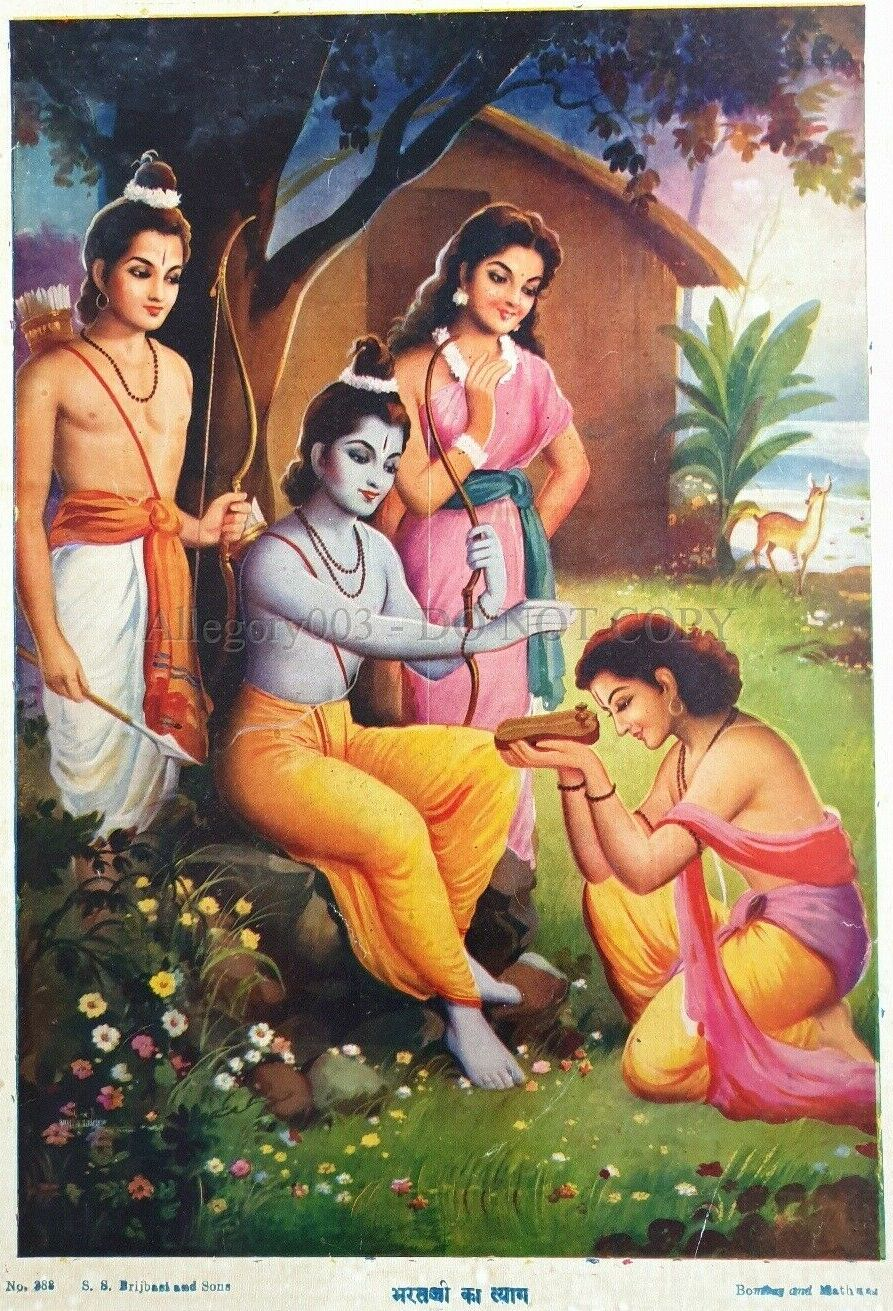
Bharat takes Rama padukas from Chitrakoot

Bharata is known for his love and devotion towards his brother Rama. Despite him not willing to take up the throne of Ayodhya, Bharata decidated himself for the people's welfare as the regent.

Rama had donned garments made of tree bark when he went to the forest. His hair was matted. Bharata had no need to dress like Rama for, he was in Ayodhya. Anyone else in his place would have enjoyed all the royal comforts at his disposal. But Bharata chose to shun all the royal riches. Like Rama, he dressed in the bark of trees and kept his hair matted.

== Worship ==
Nowadays most of the Bharata worship in India occurs in Kerala. There are rare temples dotted across the state for the worship of Lord Bharata.

Among them, the most important is the Koodalmanikyam Temple in the Thrissur district of Kerala, an ancient temple dedicated to the worship of Bharata and an integral part of the state's most famous Nalambalam circuit.

Some other Bharata temples in Kerala are:

- Amanakara Sree Bharathaswamy Temple, Kottayam
- Memmury Sree Bharata Swami Temple(Bharatapilly), Ernakulam
- Karinchapadi-Chirammal Sree Bharatha Swami Temple, Malappuram
- Elayavoor Sree Bharatha Swamy Temple, Kannur
- Kuzhalmannam Pulpuramandham Bharata Temple, Palakkad
- Bharatamala Sree Bharatan Temple, Kallur, Thrissur
- Marathombilli Sree Bharata Temple. Chalakudy, Thrissur

In the Medak district of Telangana, there is a temple called Sri Kalyana Ramachandra Sannadhi that is dedicated to Bharata and Mandavi.

== In popular culture ==
=== Films ===
The following people portrayed Bharata in the film adaptation of Ramayana.

- Sivaji Ganesan portrayed him in the 1958 Tamil film Sampoorna Ramayanam.
- Master Sekhar portrayed him in the 1976 Tamil film Dasavatharam.
- Chinna Pulliah portrayed him in the 1977 Malayalam film Kanchana Sita.
- Rahul Bose and Adarsh Gautam voiced him in the 1992 animated film Ramayana: The Legend of Prince Rama.
- Chiranjeevi portrayed him in the 1997 Telugu film Ramayanam.
- Sameer portrayed him in the 2011 Telugu film Sri Rama Rajyam.
- Adinath Kothare portrayed him in the 2026 Hindi film, Ramayana: Part 1.

=== Television ===
The following people portrayed Bharata in the television adaptation of Ramayana.

- Sanjay Jog portrayed him in the 1987 series Ramayan and in the 1988 series Luv Kush.
- Riten Mukherjee / Rahul Khetarpal portrayed him in the 1997 series Jai Hanuman.
- Ayush Pandey portrayed him in the 2002 series Ramayan.
- Vije Bhatia portrayed him in the 2008 series Ramayan
- Vineet Kumar portrayed him in the 2011 series Devon Ke Dev...Mahadev.
- Bharat Kundra portrayed him in the 2012 mini-series Ramleela – Ajay Devgn Ke Saath.
- Eklavya Ahir portrayed him in the 2015 series Sankat Mochan Mahabali Hanumaan.
- Sujay Reu portrayed him in the 2015 series Siya Ke Ram
- Kanan Malhotra portrayed him in the 2019 series Ram Siya Ke Luv Kush
- Vikram Singh Chauhan portrayed him in the 2021 web series Ramyug.
- Nikhilesh Rathore portrayed him in the 2024 series Shrimad Ramayan
- Aryan Mishra portrayed him in 2024 DD National series Kakabhushundi Ramayan- Anasuni Kathayein.
- Shaurya Upadhyay portrayed him as young Bharata in 2025 Sony Sab series Veer Hanuman.

==== YouTube ====
- Karan Parnami portrayed him in 2024 YouTube series Valmiki Ramayan.

=== Books ===
- Bharata: Love and Justice in the Ramayana by Anantanand Rambachan, published in 1993.
- The Legacy of Bharata by StoryBuddiesPlay, published in 2011.
