= Nattika =

- Village
- Location in Kerala, India Nattika (India)
- Country: India
- State: Kerala
- District: Thrissur

Languages
  - Official: Malayalam, English
- Time zone: UTC+5:30 (IST)
- Postal code: 680566
- Vehicle registration: KL-75 THRIPRAYAR
- Nearest city: Triprayar
- Lok Sabha constituency: Thrissur

Nattika is a small village in Thrissur district of Kerala state, South India, on the Arabian Sea on the west coast of Thrissur. Conolly Canal is the eastern border of Nattika. It is an assembly constituency.

In November 2024 several people were crushed to death in an accident in Nattika.

== Education ==
- Sree Narayana College, Nattika affiliated to the University Of Calicut.
- Sree Narayana Guru College Of Advanced Studies (SNGC), Nattika affiliated to the University Of Calicut.
- Sree Rama Polytechnic, Thriprayar

There is a TSGA Indoor Stadium at Thriprayar which hosts many state and national level events.

== Notable people ==
M. A. Yusuff Ali - Indian businessman

T. N. Prathapan-Indian politician

== Politics ==
Nattika assembly constituency is part of Trichur (Lok Sabha constituency).

== See also ==
- Sree Narayana College (SN College), Nattika
- Sree Narayana Guru College Of Advanced Studies (SNGC), Nattika
- University Of Calicut.
