= Shatrughna =

Rama's brother in epic Ramayana

- Prince of Kosala; King of Madhupura and Vidisha
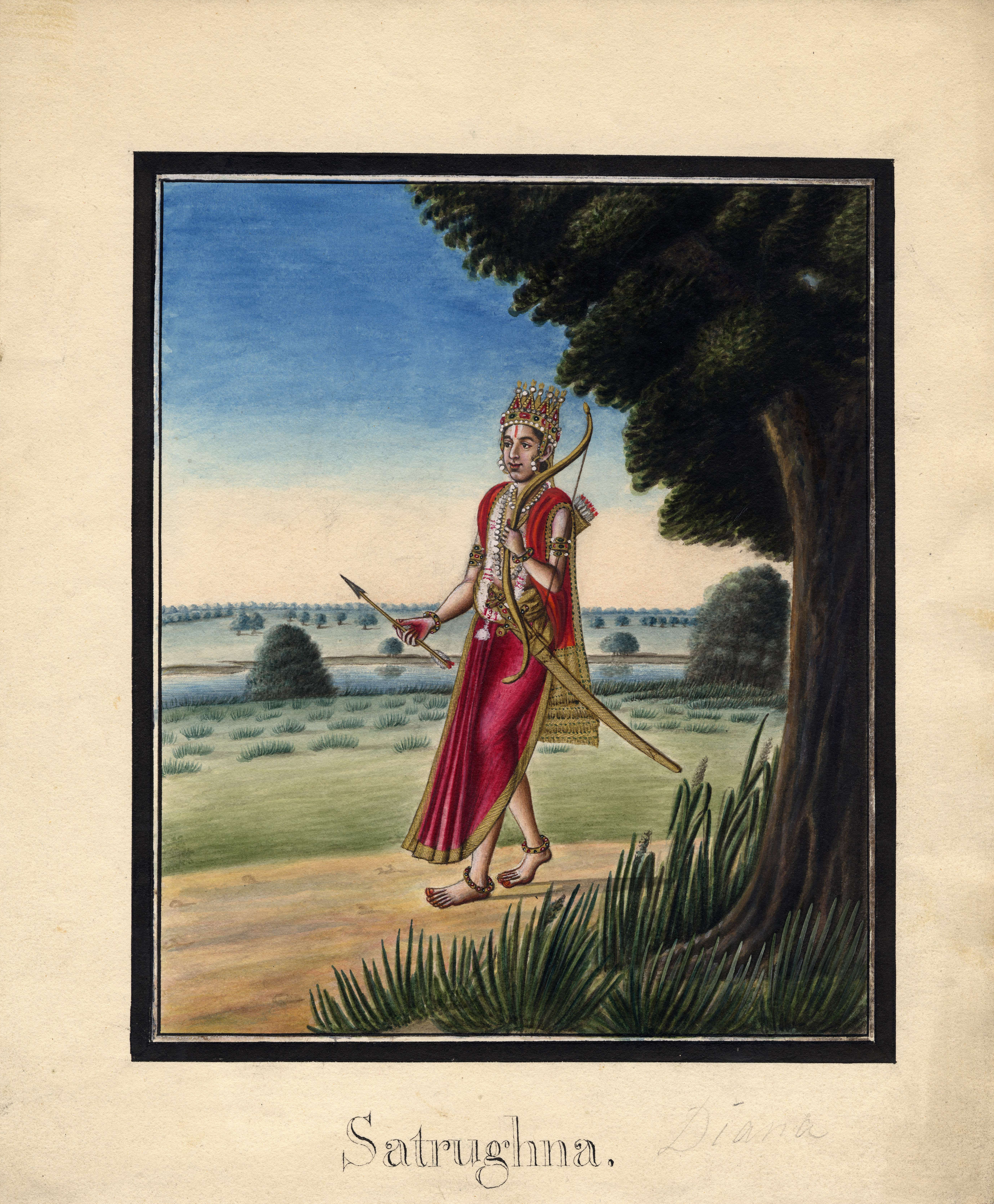
- Shatrughna, the youngest brother of Rama
- Affiliation: Avatar of Sudarshana Chakra of Vishnu
- Texts: Ramayana and its other versions

Genealogy
- Avatar birth: Ayodhya, Kosala (present-day Uttar Pradesh, India)
- Avatar end: Sarayu River, Ayodhya, Kosala (present-day Uttar Pradesh, India)
- Parents: Dasharatha (father); Sumitra (mother); Kaikeyi (step-mother); Kausalya (step-mother)
- Siblings: Lakshmana (brother); Rama (half-brother); Bharata (half-brother)
- Spouse: Shrutakirti
- Children: Subahu; Shatrughati
- Dynasty: Raghuvamsha-Suryavamsha

Shatrughna (Sanskrit: शत्रुघ्न, lit. 'killer of enemies', IAST: Śatrughna), also known as Ripudaman, is the younger brother of Rama, and King of Madhupuri and Vidisha, in the Hindu epic Ramayana. He is considered an incarnation of the Sudarshana Chakra of god Vishnu, and was married to Shrutakirti.

Shatrughna is the twin of Lakshmana. He is a loyalist of Bharata, just like Lakshmana is to Rama. Shatrughna appears as the 412th name of Vishnu in the Vishnu Sahasranama of the Mahabharata. Shatrughna is often overlooked and is the least known out of all of Rama's brothers.

== Etymology ==
The name Shatrughna is of Sanskrit origin. Shatru means 'enemy' and Ghna means 'killing'. His name means 'killer of enemies'.

== Legend ==
=== Birth and early life ===
King Dasharatha of Ayodhya had three wives: Kausalya, Kaikeyi, and Sumitra. Shatrughan and his elder brother Lakshmana were born to Sumitra, while Rama and Bharata were born to Kausalya and Kaikeyi. In the Ramayana, he is described as an incarnation of Sudarshana Chakra.

=== Marriage to Shrutakirti ===
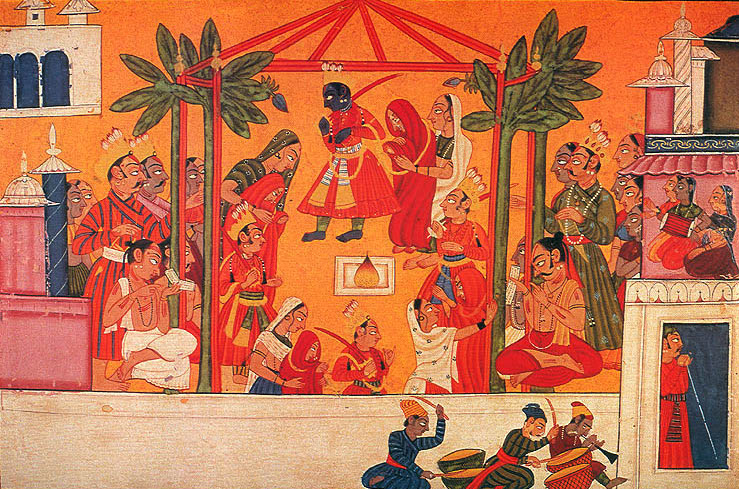
Marriage of the four brothers

After Rama won the svayamvara of Sita, their marriage was fixed. King Dasharatha arrived in Mithila for his son's wedding and noticed that Lakshmana had feelings for Urmila, but according to tradition, Bharata and Mandavi were to marry first. King Dasharatha then arranged for Bharata to marry Mandavi and Shatrughna to marry Shrutakirti, allowing Lakshmana to marry Urmila. Ultimately, all four sisters married the four brothers, strengthening the alliance between the two kingdoms. Shatrughna and Shrutakirti had two sons named Subahu and Shatrughati.

=== Rama's exile ===
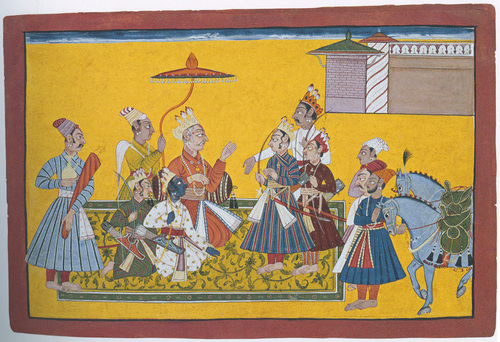
Bharata and Shatrughna leave for Kekeya, taking leave from Dasharatha, Rama and Lakshmana

When Rama was exiled, Shatrughna dragged Kaikeyi's old nurse Manthara (who was responsible for poisoning the queen's mind against Rama) and tried to kill her, but he was restrained by Bharata, who felt that Rama would not approve. Bharata went to Rama and asked him to come back to Ayodhya, but Rama refused. Bharata ruled Ayodhya from Nandigram and was an excellent leader, acting as the very embodiment of dharma. Although Bharata was the king designate of Ayodhya during Rama's exile, it was Shatrughna who undertook of the administration of the whole kingdom during Rama's absence. Shatrughna was the only solace for the three queen mothers during the absence of Rama, Lakshmana, and Bharata from Ayodhya.

=== Rage against Manthara ===
Manthara appears only once in the Ramayana after Rama's banishment. Having been rewarded by Kaikeyi with costly clothing and jewels, she was walking in the palace gardens when Bharata and his half-brother Shatrughna came upon her. Seeing her, Shatrughna flew into a violent rage over Rama's banishment and decided to attack her. Kaikeyi begged Bharata to save her, which he did, telling Shatrughna that it would be a sin to kill a woman, and that Rama would be furious with both of them if he did such a thing. He relented and the brothers left, while Kaikeyi attempted to comfort Manthara.

=== Slaying of Lavanasura ===
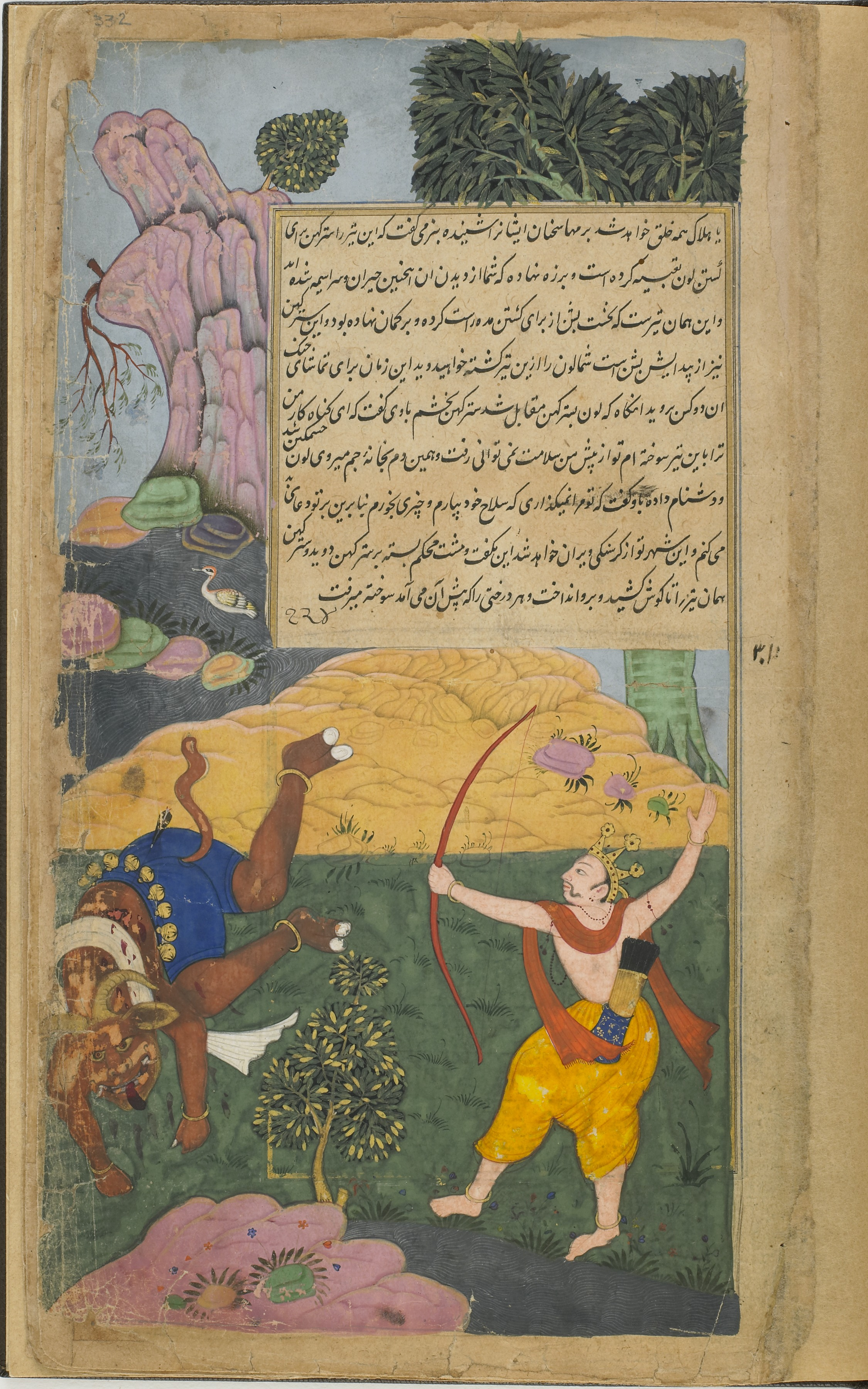
Shatrughna slays Lavana

Although he played a relatively minor role in the Ramayana, Shatrughna was important to the main story and goal of the epic. His chief exploit was the killing of Lavanasura, the demon King of Madhupura (Mathura), who was a nephew of Ravana, the King of Lanka, slain by Rama.

Lavanasura was the son of Madhu, the pious demon-king after whom the city of Madhupura was named. Madhu's wife and Lavanusara's mother Kumbhini was a sister of Ravana. Lavanasura was holder of the divine Trishula (Trident) of Lord Shiva, and nobody was able to kill him or prevent him from committing sinful activities.

Shatrughna requested Rama and his elder brothers to allow him the opportunity to serve them by killing Lavanasura. Shatrughna killed the demon with an arrow imbibed with the power of Vishnu. After Lavanasura's death, Rama crowned him King of Madhupura.

=== Death ===
Shatrughna divided his kingdom consisting of Madhupura and Vidisha between his sons Subahu and Shatrughati. After Rama, the seventh Avatar of Vishnu completed 11,000 years of perfectly pious rule upon earth, walked into the river Sarayu to return to his true and eternal Mahavishnu form, Bharata and Shatrughna also followed him into the river and later merged into Mahavishnu.

== Assessment ==
Shatrughna was the youngest of the fourth brothers. He dedicated himself in the service of his brother, Bharata. When Bharata, decided to stay at Nandigram, Shatrughna wanted to accompany him. But on his brother's request, he stayed in Ayodhya and looked after the state as an administrator. Shatrughna also looked after all his three mothers.

== Worship ==
In the Medak district of Telangana, there is a temple called Sri Kalyana Ramachandra Sannadhi that is dedicated to Shatrughna and Shrutakirti. This temple is the only one in India that has installed statues of Rama's brothers and their wives.

In Kerala, Shatrughna temples are integral to the state's Nalambalam pilgrimages during the Malayalam month of Karkidakam which is dedicated to the reading of the Ramayana and thus aptly called Ramayana masam(Ramayana month). The temples are:

- Payammal Sree Shatrughna Swami Temple, Thrissur
- Methiri Sree Sathrughnaswamy Temple, Kottayam
- Nedungaattu Sree Shatrugna Swami Temple(Mammalassery), Ernakulam
- Naranathu Shatrughna Swami Temple, Malappuram
- Payam Sri Mahavishu (Shatrughna) Temple, Kannur
- Sree Shatrughna Swami Temple, Kalkulam, Kuthannur, Palakkad

Another temples dedicated to him are as follow:

- Shatrughna Temple at Muni Ki Reti, Rishikesh
- Shatrughna Temple near Kans-tila, Mathura, UP

== In popular culture ==
=== Films ===
- Nitish Sharma portrayed him in the 2026 Hindi film, Ramayana: Part 1.

=== Television ===
The following people portrayed Shatrughna in the television adaptation of Ramayana.

- Sameer Rajda portrayed him in the 1987 series Ramayan and the 1998 series Luv Kush.
- Hitesh Kumar portrayed him in the 1997 series Jai Hanuman.
- Amit Pachori portrayed him in the 2002 series Ramayan.
- Lalit Negi portrayed him in the 2008 series Ramayan.
- Harshad Arora portrayed him in the 2011 series Devon Ke Dev...Mahadev.
- Shreshth Kumar / Nishant Kumar portrayed him in the 2015 series Sankat Mochan Mahabali Hanumaan.
- Pratham Kunwar portrayed him in the 2015 series Siya Ke Ram.
- Akhil Kataria portrayed him in the 2019 series Ram Siya Ke Luv Kush.
- Samarthya Gupta / Purusharth Rawat portrayed him in the 2024 series Shrimad Ramayan.
- Pushya Mitra portrayed him in 2024 DD National series Kakabhushundi Ramayan- Anasuni Kathayein.

==== YouTube ====
- Sumukh Mehrishi portrayed him in 2024 YouTube series Valmiki Ramayan.

=== Books ===
- Shatrughna Charit by Ravindra Shukla 'Ravi', published in 2014.
