= Triprayar =

Thriprayar Thirupurayar
- Town
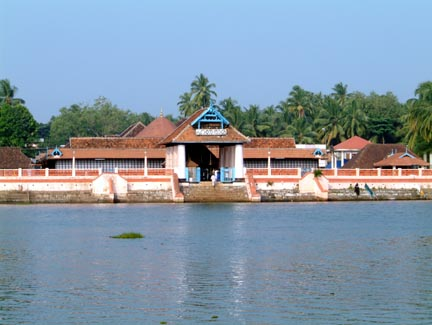
- Sri Rama temple at Thriprayar
- Nickname: TPR
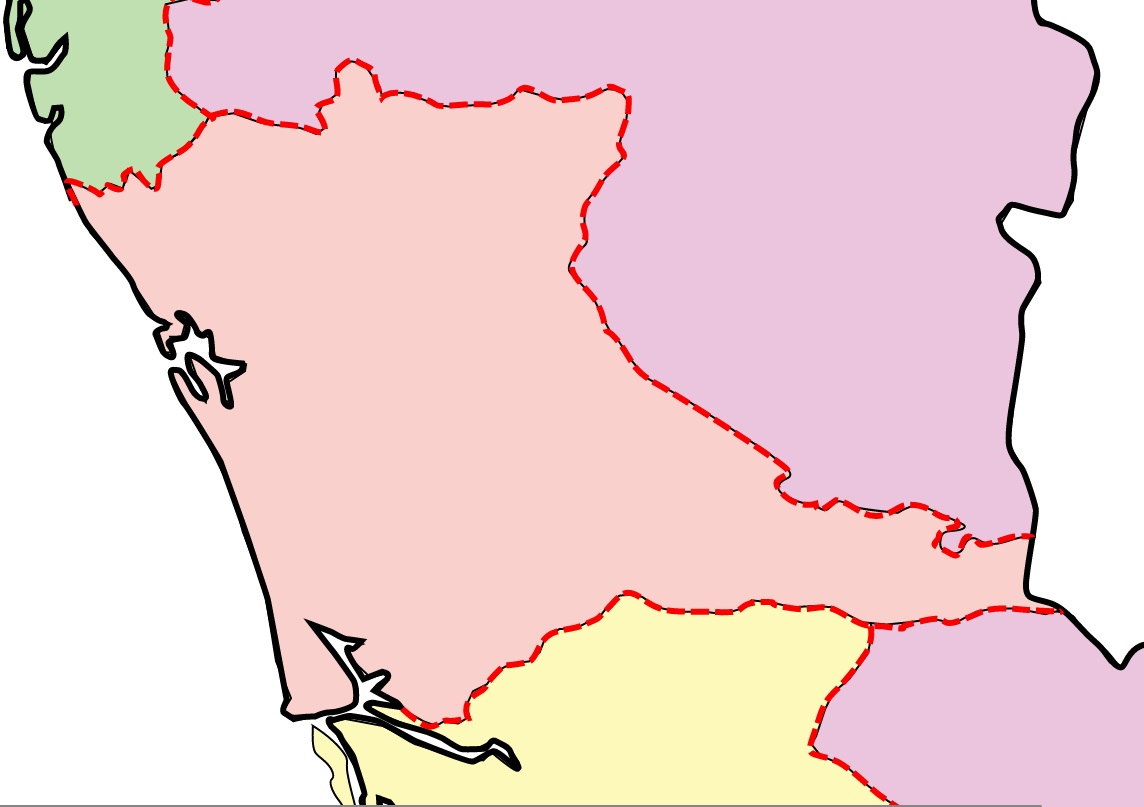
- Location in Kerala, India Thriprayar (Thrissur)
- Coordinates: 10.4136°N 76.1131°E
- Country: India
- State: Kerala
- District: Thrissur District

Government
  - Body: Nattika Grama Panchayath

Languages
  - Official: Malayalam, English
- Time zone: UTC+5:30 (IST)
- PIN: 680566,680567
- Telephone code: 0487
- Vehicle registration: KL-75
- Nearest city: Thrissur city

Thriprayar is a town in Thrissur District of Kerala, India. It is famous for the Thriprayar Temple. It is a part of Thrissur Metropolitan Area. It has one of the 4 temples which is visited in Nalambalam Yatra(Rama-Bharta-Lakshmana-Shaturghna).

== History ==
The Thriprayar Temple was originally under the domain of the Zamorins, rulers of Calicut. It later came under the possession of the Dutch, then Mysore Sultans and the rulers of Cochin. Now it is one of the several temples governed by Cochin Devaswom Board.

== Geography ==
The town is centered on the Sree Rama Temple(Thriprayar Temple) Triprayar is about 23 km away from Guruvayoor Sri Krishna temple and 20 km away from Irinjalakuda temple, Kodungallur temple is 24 km away. The nearest railhead is Thrissur, 22 km east of the temple.The Thriprayar Temple situated on the bank of 'Thirupurayar' which means The Sacred River in front of Temple. Thirupurayar pronounced as 'Triprayar' during the course of time (decades Or centuries) .This river is also known as Karuvannur River. This River later developed as Inland Water Route in end of 18th Century named as Conolly Canal, which connects Kozhikode and Kodungallur.The Town is situated 3 kms away Arabian Seashore

== Government ==
The Thriprayar Town is mainly situated under The Nattika Gramapanchayath. it was established in 1964, when Kerala expanded and reorganized its Panchayati Raj institutions under the state's local self-government system.Today it have 15 Local wards under this Local body. The Major Political parties are Indian National Congress, Communist Party of India (Marxist), And IUML and Communist Party of India have each members on local body wards. Bharatiya Janata Party had won at some wards on local body elections.

== Educational institutions ==
- Sree Narayana College, Nattika
- Sree Narayana Guru College Of Advanced Studies, Nattika
- Sree Rama Govt. Polytechnic College, Triprayar
- Nattika East U P School, Cherkara
- Aided U.P School Thriprayar
- KM UP School, Nattika Beach
- SNDP LP School, Thriprayar
- SN Trust Higher Secondary School
- Carmel public school
- Lemer Public School ,Thriprayar
- Government Fisheries Higher Secondary School, Nattika

== Villages and suburbs ==
- Nattika
- Valapad
- Vadanappally

== See also ==
- Sree Narayana College, Nattika
- Sree Narayana Guru College Of Advanced Studies, Nattika
