= Versions of the Ramayana =

Different versions of the Indian epic poem Ramayana

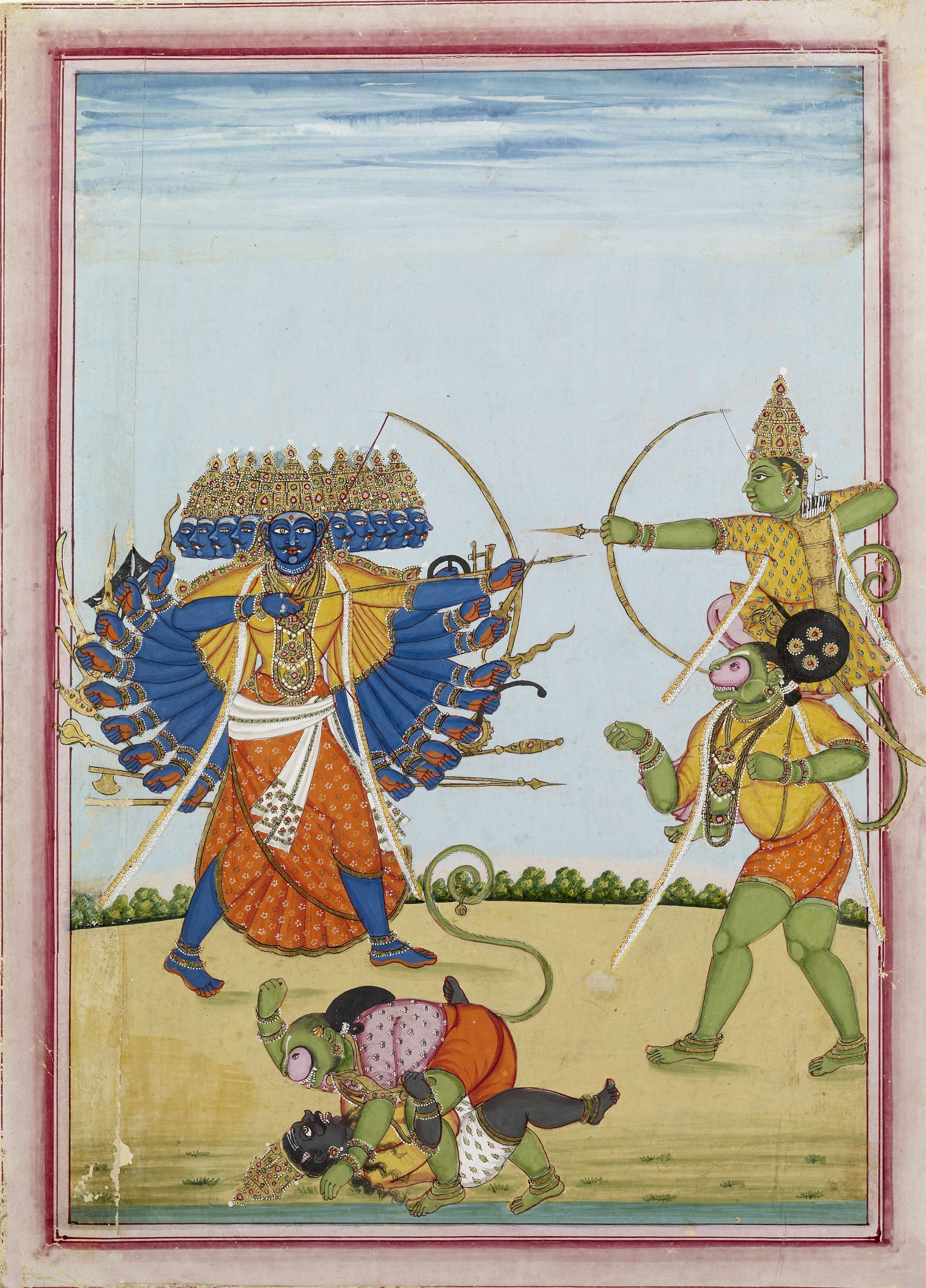
Rama (right), seated on the shoulders of Hanuman, battles the demon-king Ravana.

Depending on the methods of counting, as many as three hundred versions of the Indian Hindu epic poem, the Ramayana, are known to exist. The oldest version is generally recognized to be the Sanskrit version attributed to sage Narada, the Mula Ramayana. The original Mula Ramayana is said to contain a hundred crore (one billion) verses. Narada passed on the knowledge to Valmiki, who authored Valmiki Ramayana, the present oldest available version of Ramayana.

The Ramayana has spread to many Asian countries outside of India, including Burma, Indonesia, Cambodia, Laos, Philippines, Sri Lanka, Nepal, Thailand, Singapore, Malaysia, Japan, Mongolia, Vietnam and China. The original Valmiki version has been adapted or translated into various regional languages, which have often been marked more or less by plot twists and thematic adaptations. Some of the important adaptations of the classic tale include the 12th-century Tamil language Ramavataram, 12th-century Kannada Ramachandra Charitapurana or Pampa Ramayana by Nagachandra, 13th-century Telugu language Sri Ranganatha Ramayanam, 14th or 15th-century Assamese Saptakanda Ramayana, 15th-century Bengali Krittivasi Ramayana, 16th-century Awadhi Ramcharitmanas, 17th-century Malayalam language Adhyathmaramayanam Kilippattu, the Khmer Reamker, the Old Javanese Kakawin Ramayana, and the Thai Ramakien, the Lao Phra Lak Phra Lam, and the Burmese Yama Zatdaw.

The manifestation of the core themes of the original Ramayana is far broader even than can be understood from a consideration of the different languages in which it appears, as its essence has been expressed in a diverse array of regional cultures and artistic mediums. For instance, the Ramayana has been expressed or interpreted in Lkhaon Khmer dance theatre, in the Ramanattam and Kathakali of Kerala, in the Mappila Songs of the Muslims of Kerala and Lakshadweep, in the Indian operatic tradition of Yakshagana, and in the epic paintings still extant on, for instance, the walls of Thailand's Wat Phra Kaew palace temple. In Indonesia, the tales of the Ramayana appear reflected in traditional dance performances such as Sendratari Ramayana and Kecak, masked danced drama, and Wayang shadow puppetry. Angkor Wat in Siem Reap also has mural scenes from the epic Battle of Lanka on one of its outer walls.

== Sanskrit versions ==
Below are a few of the most prominent Sanskrit versions of the Ramayana. Some primarily recount Valmiki's narrative, while others focus more on peripheral stories and/or philosophical expositions:

- Adhyatma Ramayana or spiritual Ramayana is extracted from the Brahmanda Purana, traditionally ascribed to Vyasa. It is thought to be the inspiration for Tulsidas’ Ramcharitmanas in Awadhi. While the Valmiki Ramayana emphasizes Rama's human nature, the Adhyatam Ramayana tells the story from the perspective of his divinity. It is organized into seven Kandas, parallel to Valmiki's.
- Vasistha Ramayana (more commonly known as Yoga Vasistha) is traditionally attributed to Valmiki. It is principally a dialogue between Vasistha and Rama in which Vasistha advances many of the principle tenets of Advaita Vedanta. It includes many anecdotes and illustrative stories, but does not recount Valmiki's story of Rama in detail.
- Vasudevahiṇḍī (circa 4th century CE) authored around 4th-5th century CE by Saṅghadāsagaṇī Vāchaka, in Maharashtra Prakrit.
- Daśagrīvā Rākṣasa Charitrām Vadham (circa 6th century CE) this manuscript from Kolkata contains five kandas: Balakanda and Uttarakanda are missing. This version portrays Rama as more of a human than God.
- Laghu Yoga Vasishtha (circa 10th century) by Abhinanda of Kashmir, is an abbreviated version of the original Yoga Vasistha.
- Ananda Ramayana (circa 15th century CE) this is traditionally attributed to Valmiki. While it briefly recounts the traditional story of Rama, it is composed primarily of stories peripheral, though related, to Valmiki's narrative. This ramayana treats the last years of Rama's life and includes Ravana's abduction of Sita and Rama's installation of the Shiva Lingam at Rameswaram.
- Agastya Ramayana is also traditionally attributed to Agastya.
- Adbhuta Ramayana, traditionally attributed to Valmiki, includes related stories of Rama. Its emphasis is on the role of Sita, and includes an expanded story of the circumstances of her birth as well as an account of her defeat of Ravana's elder brother, known as Mahiravana and with 1000 heads.
- The Ramayana story is also recounted within other Sanskrit texts, including: the Mahabharata (in the Ramokhyana Parva of the Vana Parva); Bhagavata Purana contains a concise account of Rama's story in its ninth skandha; brief versions also appear in the Vishnu Purana as well as in the Agni Purana.

== In Sanskrit culture ==
- Hanumannāṭaka aka Mahānāṭaka attributed to Hanumān and according to legend rediscovered during the reign of Bhoja in the 11th century AD, exists in two recensions from Maharashtra and Bengal
- Pratima Natak by Bhāsa starts with Rama's coronation, which is stopped by Kaikeyi, and Rama's exile, which leads to Dasratha's death. When Bharat arrives at Ayodhya he sees the statue of his father with his ancestors and thus knows Dasratha is dead. In this play Kaikeyi means to say she wants Rama for exiled for fourteen days but by mistake says fourteen years.
- Abhiseka Nataka of Bhasa start with killing of Bali then Rama meet varuna for cross ocean. After killing Rawana, Rama take fire test of sita for her Chastity and finally end with coronation of Rama in Ayodhya.
- Yagna-falam of Bhasa which start with Dasratha enjoyment for Birth of his sons from yagna; then viswamitra take him Rama and Lakshman for save his yagna from Demons. Viswamitra take them Mithila for yagna of janaka and Rama married sita.
- Kundamala of Dinnaga based on uttara-ramayana. Sita exiled by Rama and sita take vow she give kundamala or Garland to river for safe Birth of her son. Sita gave birth two twins. This twins sing ramayana in Rama's court and finally Rama meet his family.
- Mahaviracharita of Bhavabhuti based on Ramayana. This play start with Rama came in Hermitage of visvamitra and end with coronation of Rama.
- Uttara-rama-charita of Bhavabhuti based on later life Rama. Play start with sita blessed by sage astavkara then Rama show picture gallery with sita. Durmukha tell him rumours about sita's Chastity so sita exiled and she given Birth twins. Janaka and kaushlaya meet in Hermitage of valmiki. Twins fight with army of Rama who protect horse of Ashwamedha. Finally valmiki arranged drama and Rama know about his family.
- Janaka jananada of kalya Lakshmi Narsingh based on Ramayana of jaimini Ashwamedha. In this play Rama's sons Lava and Kusha fight with army of Rama who protect horse of Ashwamedha. only Three mss of this play survived. It is very rare play because only four play are based on uttara-ramayana.
- Chalita-Rama based on Rama's later life written in 9th century. In this play surpanakha planned plot and sita exiled But today we not found any mss of play.
- Ramabhyudaya of Yashovarman in six acts written during 7th century CE.
- Ramabhyudaya of Ramadeva vyasa in two acts written during 15th century CE.
- Swapana-Dasanana of Bhimata-based Dream of Rawana written around 6th or 7th century CE.
- Maithili-kalyana of Hastimalla based on marriage of sita written around 9th century CE.
- Uddata-Raghava by Mayu-raja also called Anagaharsha written around 8th century CE.
- Ascharya-choodamani of Shaktibhadra written around 9th century CE based on Ramayana.
- Kritya-Rawana written during 9th century CE.
- Maya-puspaka written during 9th century CE.
- Rama-Charita drama based on Ramayana written during 9th century CE.
- Ramananada of shrigadita based on Ramayana written during 9th century CE.
- Anargha-Raghava of Murari written during 9th or 10th century CE.
- Bala-Ramyana of Raj-shekhara in ten acts written during 9th or 10th century CE.
- Abhinava-Raghava of kshiraswamin written during 10th century CE.
- Vali-Vadha written during 10th century CE. It is preksanka type drama.
- Marica-Vancitaka give ramayana story in five acts written during 11th century CE.
- Prasana-Raghava of Jayadeva is a drama in seven acts written around 12th century CE.
- Raghu-vilasa of Ramachandra written around 12th century CE.
- Raghavabhyudaya of Ramachandra written around 12th century CE. There are other three dramas of same name i by Gangadhara (1294–1325 CE), Bhagavan Raya and venkatesvara.
- Janaki-Raghava written around 12th century. Another Janaki-Ragava of Yuvraja ramasinha written in 1625 CE.
- Rama-vikrama also is a lost Ramayana drama known only through the reference made to it by Sagaranandin. It is most likely a work of the 12th century CE.
- Dutangada of Subhata. The Prologue of this play states that it was represented at the court of Tribhuvanapala, a Calukya king of Anhilvad who reigned in 1242–1243 CE, at a spring festival held in honour of the dead king Kumarapala who restored the saiva temple of Devapattana in Kathiawad. Another Dutangada of Ramachandra.
- Amogha-raghava is a lost Ramayana-drama known only through the reference made to it by singabhupala. It may be assigned to the 13th century CE.
- Abhirama-raghava is lost Ramayana-drama known only through the reference made to it by singabhupala. It seems to belong to the 13th century CE.
- Ullagha-raghava of Someshvara is a Ramayana drama belonging to the 13th-century-CE Someshvara. He was the- court-poet of Viradhavala and of Gujarat (1219–1271 CE). The manuscript of this drama is preserved in Baroda library.
- Unmatta-raghava of Bhaskara written around 14th century. The Unmatta-raghava gives a curious tale of Rama. Sita enters into a garden forbidden to the womenfolk and is transformed into a gazelle. Rama wanders in her search and his maddened soliloquies. The s'age Agasta takes pity and relieves Sita of the curse of Durvasa which was the cause of her transformation because once Durvasa disturb by gazelle.
- Unmatta-raghava of Mahadeva sastri.
- Ananda-raghava is a drama on the Ramayana theme. Its author Rajacudamani Diksita was the son of Srinivasa and Kamakshi and was patronised by king Raghunatha of Tanjore. He flourished in the last part of the 16th century. Anandaraghava describes in five acts the story of Rama from his marriage to coronation.
- Abhirama-mani of Sundaramisra is a drama in seven acts based on Ramayana written in 1599 CE.
- Adbhuta-darpana of Mahadeva is a Ramayana-drama in ten acts. Mahadeva is the son of Krsna Suri of Tanjore and belongs to the 17th century CE.
- Janaki-parinaya is a Ramayana-drama by Ramabhadra Diksita also belongs to the 17th century CE. There are two more dramas of this name, one by Narayana Bhatta and the other by Sitarama.
- Raghavananda is a Ramayana-drama by Venkatesvara belonging to the last quarter of the 17th century CE in the court of Sahaji and Serfoji of Tanjore (1684–1728).
- Sita-raghava
- Lalita-raghava is drama on the Ramayana story by Ramapani deva belonging to the middle of the 18th century CE.
- Maha-Nataka of Damodara written around 11th century CE and second written by Madhusudana around 14th century CE.
- Ram-Vijay Ankiya Naat by Srimanta Sankardev written in the 16th century in Vrajavali language.

== Regional versions ==
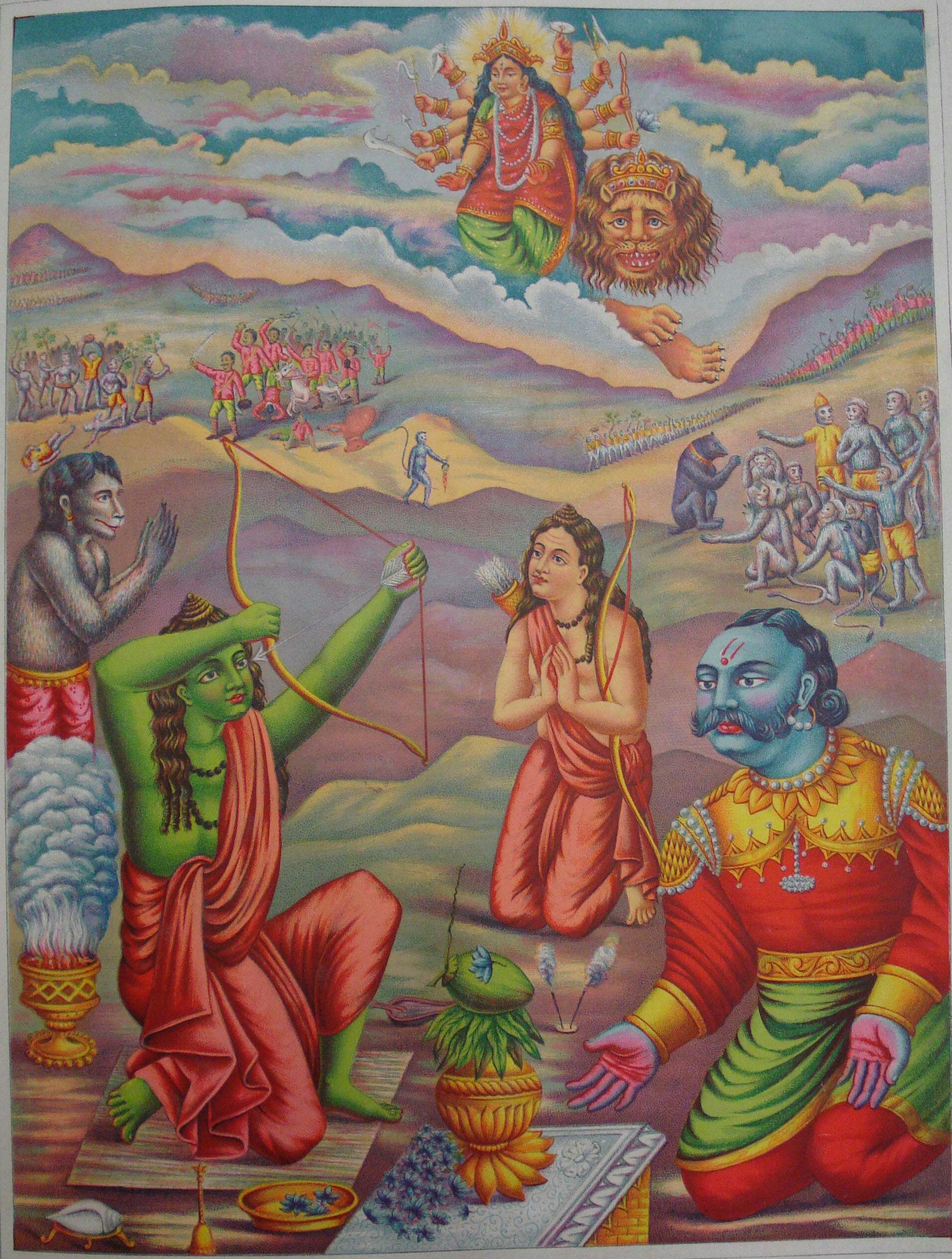
Rama is shown about to offer his eyes to make up the full number – 108 – of lotus blossoms needed in the puja that he must offer to the goddess Durga to gain her blessing. Scene from Krittivasi Ramayan.

Some noteworthy examples of these additional renderings of the Ramayana tale include:

=== States ===
- Andhra Pradesh – The Sri Ranganatha Ramayanam was adapted by Gona Budda Reddy and is the Telugu version of the Ramayana between 1300 and 1310 CE. The Molla Ramayanamu was adapted by poet Molla. The most extensive work in Telugu is that of Sri Viswanadha Satyanarayana, called the Srimadramayana Kalpavrukshamu. This is a free re-telling of the Valmiki Ramayana. It was awarded the first Jnanpith award in Telugu, for which the poet was later acclaimed as Kavi Samrat.
- Assam – a) The Assamese Saptakanda Ramayana or Katha Ramayana in the 14th century written by Madhava Kandali. b) Giti-Ramayan or Durgabari-Ramayan in the 16th century written by Durgabar Kayastha.
- Bengal – The Bengali Krittivasi Ramayan written by Krittibas Ojha in the 15th century; this is the most revered and most popular version of the epic in Bengal. The Adbhut Acharjer Ramayana by Nityananda Acharya in the 16th or 17th century, which was very close to the original work by sage Valmiki. Dwija Lakshmana's Ramayana of the 18th century. Around the same time multiple translations of the epic and parts of it were made by Kailasa Basu, Bhabani Dasa, Kabichandra Chakrabarti, Mahananda Chakrabarti, Gangarama Datta and Krishnadasa. During the mid 18th century, Ramananda Ghosh's Ramayana translation depicted Rama as an avatar of Buddha. Shankar Chakrabarti from the court of Raghunath Singha of Bishnupur translated the Ramayana again in the 18th century. An incomplete translation of the Ramayana is ascribed to Chandravati, widely known as the first poetess who wrote Ramayana in the 16th century which she made on request of her father. In the 19th century, Hemchandra Bhattacharya translated the Valmiki Ramayana in prose for the first time. The early 20th century, Rajshekhar Basu's Valmiki Ramayana translation is one of the most popular translation of the epic in Bangla.
- Bihar – In Maithili language popular in the Mithila region of present Bihar, Chanda Jha (1831–1907)'s Mithila Bhasha Ramayana Lal Das (1856–1921)'s Mithilabhasha Ramayana – Rameshwar Charit Mithila Ramayan and Janaki Ramayana– Lal Das Ramlochan Sharan (1889–1971)'s Ramayana
- Goa – Ramayanu written by Krishnadasa Shama in the 15th century in Kardalipura, Goa in Konkani, manuscripts found in Portugal.
- Gujarat - The Tulsi-Krta Ramayana is a Gujarati adaptation of Tulsidas' Ramcharitamanas in the 17th century, by the poet Premanand Swami. The Giradhara Ramayana is also a prominent retelling of Ramayana in Gujarati by the 18th-century poet Giradhara Gosvami.
- Jammu and Kashmir – The Kashmiri Ramavatara Charita was written in the 19th century.
- Karnataka – The Classical Kannada versions of the Ramayana – the Kumudendu Ramayana(a Jain version), written in the 13th century and the Kumara-Valmiki Torave Ramayana, written in the 16th century. There is another version titled Ramachandra Charita Purana written by Nagachandra during the 12th century (1149 CE). Two prose works were written by Nanadalike Lakshminarayana ('Muddanna') entitled Adbhuta Ramayana (1895) and Ramaswamedham (1898).
- Kerala – The earliest known extant poetic work in Malayalam is Ramacharitam, based on Yuddha Kanda written by Cheeraman 12th century. The Kannassa Ramayanam written by Niranam Rama Panicker in the 14th century, Adhyathmaramayanam Kilippattu written by Thunchaththu Ezhuthachan in the 16th century (The most popular one) and "Mappila Ramayanam." among the Muslims.
- Maharashtra – The Marathi Bhavartha Ramayana written by Sant Eknath in the 16th century. There is also a reference of a Ramayana being translated into old Marathi during the 12th or 13th century.
- Odisha – The Jagamohana Ramayana or Dandi Ramayana composed by Balarama Dasa in early 16th century is the prevalent version in Odisha. Another adaptation Vilanka Ramayana was written as a poem by Sarala Das in 15th century. After that Raghunath Bhanja of Gumusar wrote Raghunath Vilasa, and his grandson poet Upendra Bhanja wrote Baidehisha Vilasa in 17th century. Bisi Ramayana or Bichitra Ramayana written by Biswanath Khuntia is the most popular in stage performances as Ramleela. The Ramkatha is found in the folk and tribal traditions of Odisha.
- Uttar Pradesh (Awadh) – The Ramcharitmanas was written by Goswami Tulsidas in the 16th century.
- Tamil Nadu – The Tamil Kambaramayanam, a popular version, written by poet Kamban in the 12th century.

Other Languages

- Gond Ramayani, derived from oral folk legends.
- Persian version commissioned by the Mughal emperor Akbar in 1558–1590 and called Ramayana of Akbar.
- Urdu version called the Pothi Ramayana was written in 1776.

== Versions in other Indian religions ==
- Buddhism - Dasaratha Jataka. This version is notable for regarding Rama as a bodhisattva (on the path to Buddhahood) and depicting him and Sita as siblings who marry. As the Buddha is supposed to have come from the Ikshvaku clan (of Rama) this symbolised his dynastic merits.
- Jainism - Paumachariyam, the most influential among the Jain versions is written as a polemic against Sanskrit versions asserting that all characters in the Ramayana were mere mortals who engaged in conflict over moral issues. The only superhuman feat mentioned is Ravana's ability to fly through the clouds (meghavahana). All characters are depicted as Jains and the Rama, Sita and Lakshmana visit Jain pilgrimage sites rather than ashrams (as in Valmiki ramayana) during their stay in the forest.

== Versions outside India ==
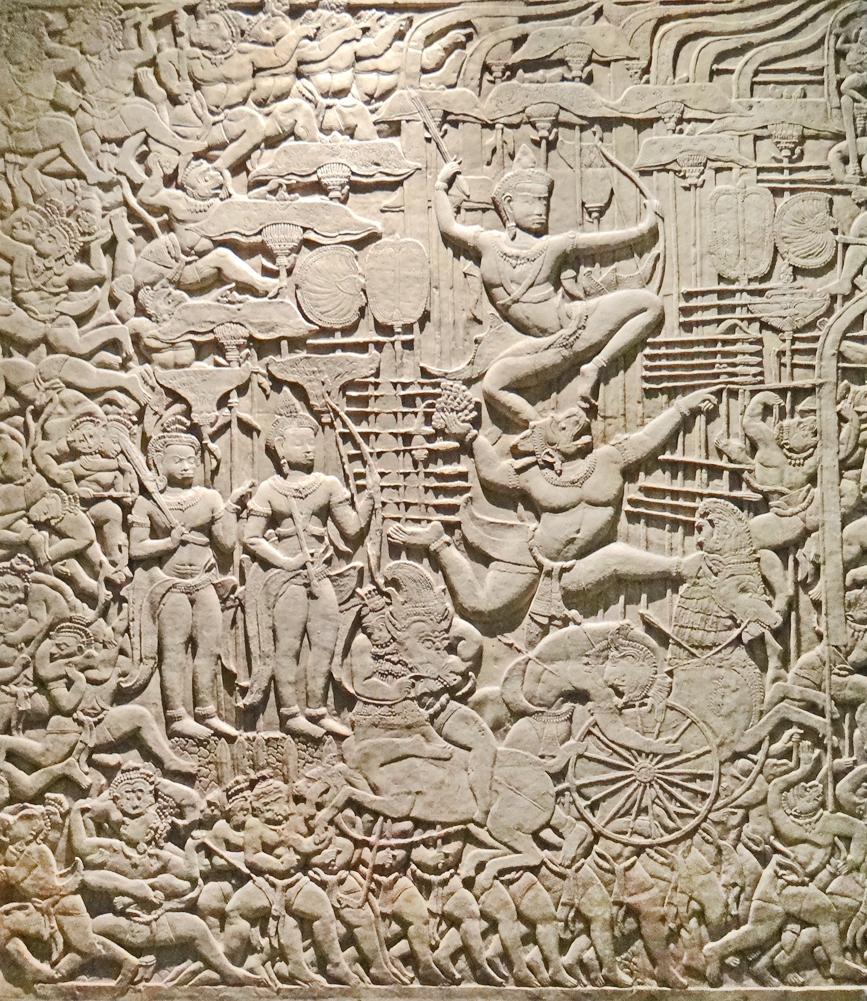
Bas-relief at Angkor Wat depicting the “Battle of Lanka”. Preah Ream (Rama) is standing on Hanuman, followed by his brother Preah Leak, and Vibhishana.

The following are among the versions of the Ramayana that have emerged outside India:

Central Asia

- Khotan Kingdom
  - The Khotanese version is somewhat similar to the Tibetan version

East Asia

- China, Tibet – found in several manuscripts from Dunhuang
  - Yunnan – Langka Sip Hor (Tai Lü language)
- Japan – Ramaenna or Ramaensho

Southeast Asia

- Cambodia – Reamker
- Indonesia:
  - Bali – Ramakavaca
  - Java – Kakawin Ramayana, Yogesvara Ramayana
  - Sumatera – Ramayana Swarnadwipa
- Laos – Phra Lak Phra Lam, Gvay Dvorahbi
- Malaysia – Hikayat Seri Rama, Hikayat Maharaja Wana
- Myanmar (Burma) – Yama Zatdaw (Yamayana)
- Philippines
  - Mindanao – Maharadia Lawana, Darangen (Maranao)
- Thailand – Ramakien
  - Kingdom of Lan Na – Phommachak
- Vietnam - Truyện Dạ Xoa Vương
  - Champa - Déwa Mâno

South Asia

- Nepal – Siddhi Ramayan (Nepal Bhasa), Bhanubhaktako Ramayan (Nepali language)
- Sri Lanka – Dasaratha Jataka, Janakiharan

== Contemporary versions ==
Contemporary prose versions of the epic Ramayana include Sri Ramayana Darshanam by K. V. Puttappa in Kannada and Ramayana Kalpavrikshamu by Viswanatha Satyanarayana in Telugu, both of which have been awarded the Jnanpith Award; Chakravarthy Thirumagan (1956) in Tamil by C. Rajagopalachari, last Governor-General of India, won Sahithya Akademy Award in 1958. A prose version called Geet Ramayan in Marathi by G.D. Madgulkar was rendered in music by Sudhir Phadke and is considered to be a masterpiece of Marathi literature. The popular Indian author R. K. Narayan wrote a shortened prose interpretation of the epic. In addition, Ramesh Menon wrote a single-volume edition of the Ramayana, which has received praise from scholars. A short version with a somewhat contemporary feel, influenced, according to the author, by contemporary representations of guerrilla warfare, appeared in Martin Buckley's Ramayana-based travelogue, An Indian Odyssey (Random House London, 2008). C Rajgopalachari, India's only Indian Governor General, also wrote a single volume Ramayana, published by Bhavans in 1957. From 1951 to 1975 a team of the University Grants Commission (India) supported researchers who worked on and published a critical edition at the Maharaja Sayajirao University of Baroda (MSU) Oriental Institute. Based on this, in 1996 an abridged translation into English, was published by writer Arshia Sattar under the Penguin publishing house Valmiki Ramayana. In September 2006, the first issue of Ramayan 3392 A.D. was published by Virgin Comics, featuring the Ramayana as re-envisioned by author Deepak Chopra and filmmaker Shekhar Kapur.

Author Ashok Banker, authored an eight-volume imaginative retelling based on the Ramayana which found considerable success and was credited with ushering in a new wave of interest in the epic as well as other mythological retellings. Banker's version took considerable liberties with the original Sanskrit epic yet found critical acclaim. It is claimed to be the most popular retelling of the epic currently.

More recently, popular Indian lyricist, music director and singer, Ravindra Jain wrote the Hindi version of Ramayan named, Ravindra Ramayan (ISBN 978-9351862604) which was published after his death. RJ Group, which was formed by Ravindra Jain and his family, has uploaded all the kands (cantos) of Ravindra Ramayan on YouTube.

The latest in the retelling of the epic is from Ravi Venugopal, a US-based NRI narrating the story from the eyes of Rama. The first volume of the I, Rama trilogy is Age of Seers and is narrated by an age old Rama who introspects his life and the events happening with a pragmatic view. The book explores new perspectives of several characters and tries to give a scientific lift to the ancient epic.

=== Screen ===
The Ramayana has been adapted on screen as well, most notably as the television series Ramayan by producer Ramanand Sagar, which is based primarily on the Ramcharitmanas and Valmiki's Ramayana and, at the time, was the most popular series in Indian television history. In the late 1990s, Sanjay Khan made a series called Jai Hanuman, recounting tales from the life of Hanuman and related characters from the Ramayana.

A Japanese animated film called Ramayana: The Legend of Prince Rama was released in 1992. US animation artist Nina Paley retold the Ramayana from Sita's point of view (with a secondary story about Paley's own marriage) in the animated musical Sita Sings the Blues. An Indian animated film called Ramayana: The Epic was released in October 2010. The Stories Without Borders Production Company has a documentary in production about different versions of the Ramayana and a second India epic, the Mahabharata, across South and Southeast Asia that is slated to film begin filming in 2014. In 2015, StarPlus hosted Siya ke Ram, a retelling of Ramayana from Sita's point of view. A two-part film series is planned, with the first film expected to release in 2026.

=== Stage ===
Starting in 1978, and under the supervision of Baba Hari Dass, the Ramayana has been performed every year by Mount Madonna School in Watsonville, California. Currently, it is the largest yearly, Western version of the epic being performed. It takes the form of a colorful musical with custom costumes, sung and spoken dialog, jazz-rock orchestration and dance. This performance takes place in a large audience theater setting usually in June, in San Jose, CA. Baba Hari Dass has thought acting arts, costume-attire design, masks making, and choreography to bring alive characters of Sri Ram, Sita, Hanuman, Lakshmana, Shiva, Parvati, Vibhishan, Jatayu, Sugriva, Surpanakha, Ravana and his rakshasa court, Meghnaad, Kumbhakarna, and the army of monkeys and demons.

Tamil Actor R. S. Manohar played Ravana as the antagonist in Lankeswaran.

=== Comic series ===
Artist Vikas Goel and writer Vijayendra Mohanty have created a ten-part comic series called Ravanayan that presents the story of Ramayana from Ravana's perspective.

Following the success of Ashok Banker's Ramayana Series retellings, a graphic novel adaptation was released in 2010.

== See also ==
- Ramayana
- Vernacular
- Epic Poetry
