= Ramakien =

National epic of Thailand

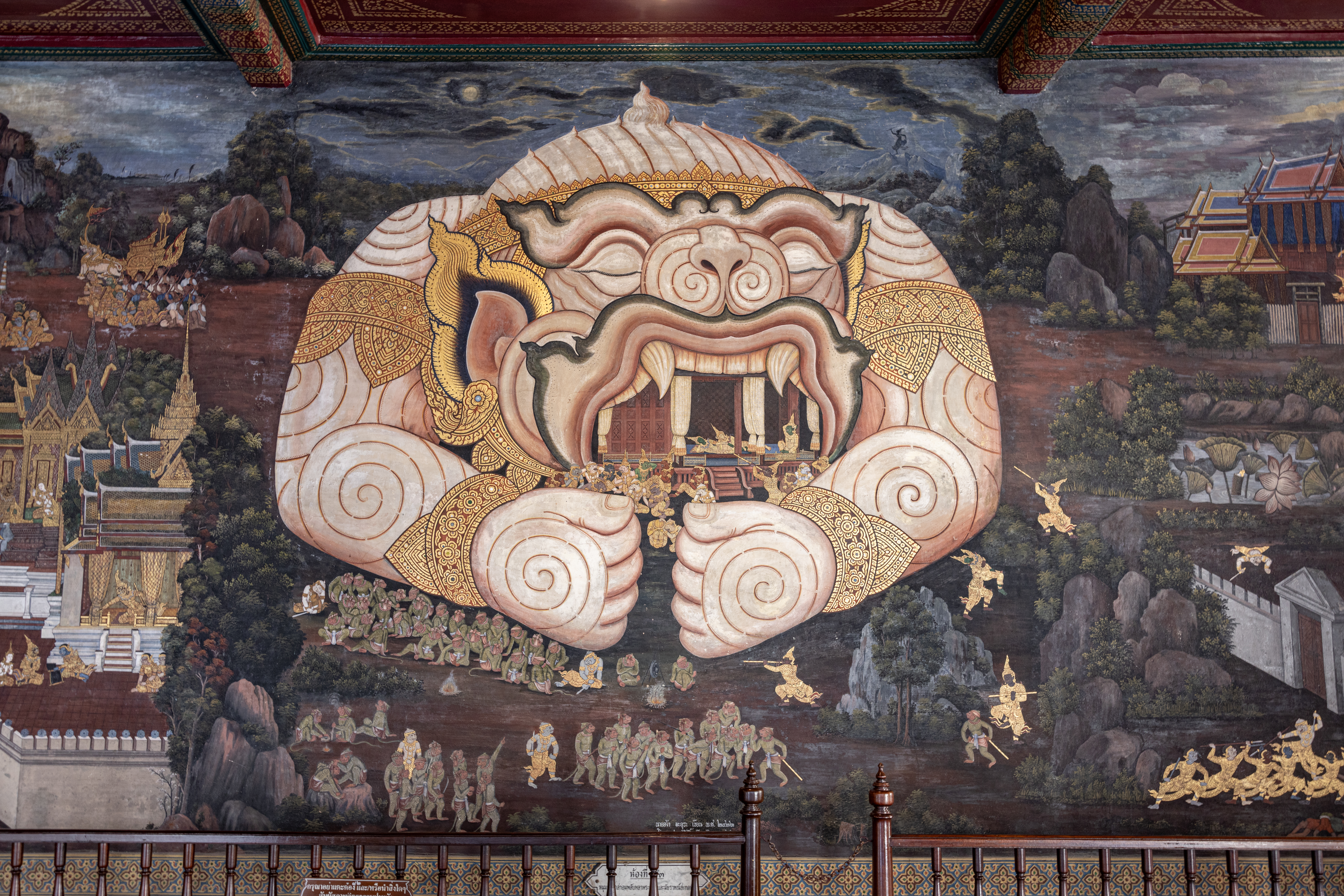
- Ramakien mural at Wat Phra Kaew depicting the episode in which Hanuman volunteers to swallow Rama's pavilion.

Information
- Religion: Hinduism
- Author: Various (notably King Rama I)
- Language: Thai
- Period: 18th century (standard version)

The Ramakien (Thai: รามเกียรติ์, RTGS: Rammakian, pronounced [rāːm.mā.kīa̯n]; from Sanskrit: Rāmakīrti lit. 'Glory of Rama'; sometimes also spelled Ramakian) is one of Thailand's national epics. It is a Thai version of the ancient Indian Hindu epic Ramayana, and an important part of the Thai literary canon.

King Rama VI (r. 1910 – 1925) was the first person to shed light first on the Ramayana studies in Thailand, by tracing the sources of the Ramakien, comparing it with the Sanskrit Valmiki Ramayana. He found that the Ramakien was influenced by three sources: the Valmiki's Ramayana, the Vishnu Purana, and Hanuman Nataka. A number of versions of the epic were lost in the destruction of Ayutthaya in 1767. Three versions currently exist, one of which was prepared in 1797 under the supervision of (and partly written by) King Rama I. His son, Rama II, rewrote some parts of his father's version for khon drama. The work has had an important influence on Thai literature, art and drama (both the khon and nang dramas being derived from it).

While the main story is similar to that of the Dasaratha Jataka, differences in some tales still prevail. Many other aspects were transposed into a Thai context, such as the clothes, weapons, topography, and elements of nature, which are described as being Thai in style. As Thailand is considered a Theravada Buddhist society, the Buddhist history latent in the Ramakien serves to provide Thai legends with a creation myth, as well as representations of various spirits which complement beliefs derived from Thai animism.

A painted representation of the Ramakien is displayed at Bangkok's Temple of Emerald Buddha, and many of the statues there depict characters from it.

== Background ==
The Ramayana came to Southeast Asia by means of Buddhist missionaries, Indian traders, and scholars who traded with Khmer kingdoms (such as Funan and Angkor) and Srivijaya, with whom the Indians shared close economic and cultural ties. Another major contributor to introduction of the Ramakatha tradition may have been maritime trade with the Chola and Pallava Empires of South India. Srivijaya was invaded by the Cholas once, during the Great South Eastern Maritime campaign of Rajendra Chola I. The Thai adopted from the Khmer people components of Indianized culture such as the Ramayana. It is worth remembering that the influence of other variants of the Ramakatha tradition, notably Kamban's Ramayan, popular in the Pallava court, may have led to depictions of Tosakanth (Ravana) in the Ramakien as being a more multidimensional character than in the vitriolic diatribe of Valmiki.

In the late first millennium, the Ramakien epic (written as Ramkerti, รามเกียรติ์ but read as Ramakien) was adopted by the Thai people. The oldest recordings of the early Sukhothai kingdom, dating from the 13th century, include stories from the Jataka legends. The history of the legends was told in the shade theater (Thai: หนัง, Nang), a shadow-puppet show in a style adopted from Indonesia, in which the characters were portrayed by leather dolls manipulated to cast shadows on a nearby screen as the audience watched from the other side.

The Thai version was first written down in the 18th century, during the Ayutthaya Kingdom, following the demise of the Sukhothai government. Most editions, however, were lost when the city of Ayutthaya was destroyed by armies from Burma (modern Myanmar) in the year 1767.

The version recognized today was compiled in the Kingdom of Siam under the supervision of King Rama I (1726–1809), the founder of the Chakri dynasty, which still maintains the throne of Thailand. Between the years of 1799 and 1807, Rama I supervised this well-known recension and even wrote parts of it. It was also under his reign that construction began on the Thai Grand Palace in Bangkok, which includes the grounds of the Wat Phra Kaew, enshrining the Emerald Buddha. The walls of the Wat Phra Kaew are lavishly decorated with paintings representing parts of the Ramakien.

Rama II (1766–1824) further adapted his father's edition of the Ramakien for khon drama, a form of theater performed by non-speaking Thai dancers in elaborate costumes and masks. Narrations from the Ramakien were read by a chorus to one side of the stage. This version differs slightly from the one compiled by Rama I, giving an expanded role to Hanuman, the god-king of the apes, and adding a happy ending.

Since its introduction to the Thai people, the Ramakien has become a firm component of culture. The Ramakien of Rama I is considered a masterpiece of Thai literature, and is still read and taught in the country's schools.

In 1989, Satyavrat Shastri translated the Ramakien into a Sanskrit epic poem (mahakavya) named Ramakirtimahakavyam, in 25 sargas (cantos) and about 1,200 stanzas in 14 metres. This work won eleven national and international awards.

== Content ==
The tales of the Ramakien are similar to those of the Ramayana, though transferred to the topography and culture of Ayutthaya, where the Avatar of Phra Narai (the Thai incarnation of Vishnu, who is also known as Narayana, Govinda, Vasudeva) is reborn as Phra Ram.

=== Main figures ===
==== Divine beings ====
- Phra Narai/Witsanu – Vishnu/Narayana
- Phra Isuan – Shiva (who is also known by the epithet Ishvara)
- Phra Phrom – Brahma/Sahampati/Byanma
- Phra Uma-thewi – consort of Phra Isuan (Parvati/Uma)
- Phra Laksami – Lakshmi, the consort of Narai
- Phra In (Indra) – king of thevadas (devas) – lesser celestial deities. Divine father of Phali (Vali)
- Mali Warat (Malyavan) – god of justice. Maternal grandfather of Thotsakan (Ravana)
- Phra Athit (Aditya/Surya) – the solar deity. Divine father of Sukhrip (Sugriva)
- Phra Phai (Vayu) – the wind deity. Father of Hanuman.
- Phra Witsawakam/Witsanukam (Vishvakarma) – the artisan god, responsible for rebuilding Lanka after Hanuman burned it down and creator of Khitkhin (Kishkindha) in Ramayana and Dvaraka (Capital of Krishna's Kingdom) in the Mahabharata.

==== Human ====
- Phra Ram – the Bodhisatta, son of the king Thotsarot (Dasharatha) of Ayutthaya and the incarnation of Phra Narai.
- Nang Sida – (Sita) wife of Phra Ram, who embodies purity and fidelity. Incarnation of Lakshmi.
- Phra Phrot (Bharata), Phra Lak (Lakshmana) and Phra Satarut (Shatrughna) – Younger half-brothers of Phra Ram, who represent the reincarnated possessions of Phra Narai.
- Thotsarot – (Dasharatha) is often called Thao Thotsarot. King of Ayutthaya and father of Phra Ram and his brothers.
- Nang Kaosuriya (Kausalya) – one of the three wives of Thotsarot, mother of Phra Ram.
- Nang Kaiyakesi (Kaikeyi) – one of the three wives of Thotsarot, mother of Phra Phrot.
- Nang Samutthewi (Sumitra) – one of the three wives of Thotsarot, mother of Phra Lak and Phra Satarut.

==== Allies of Phra Ram ====
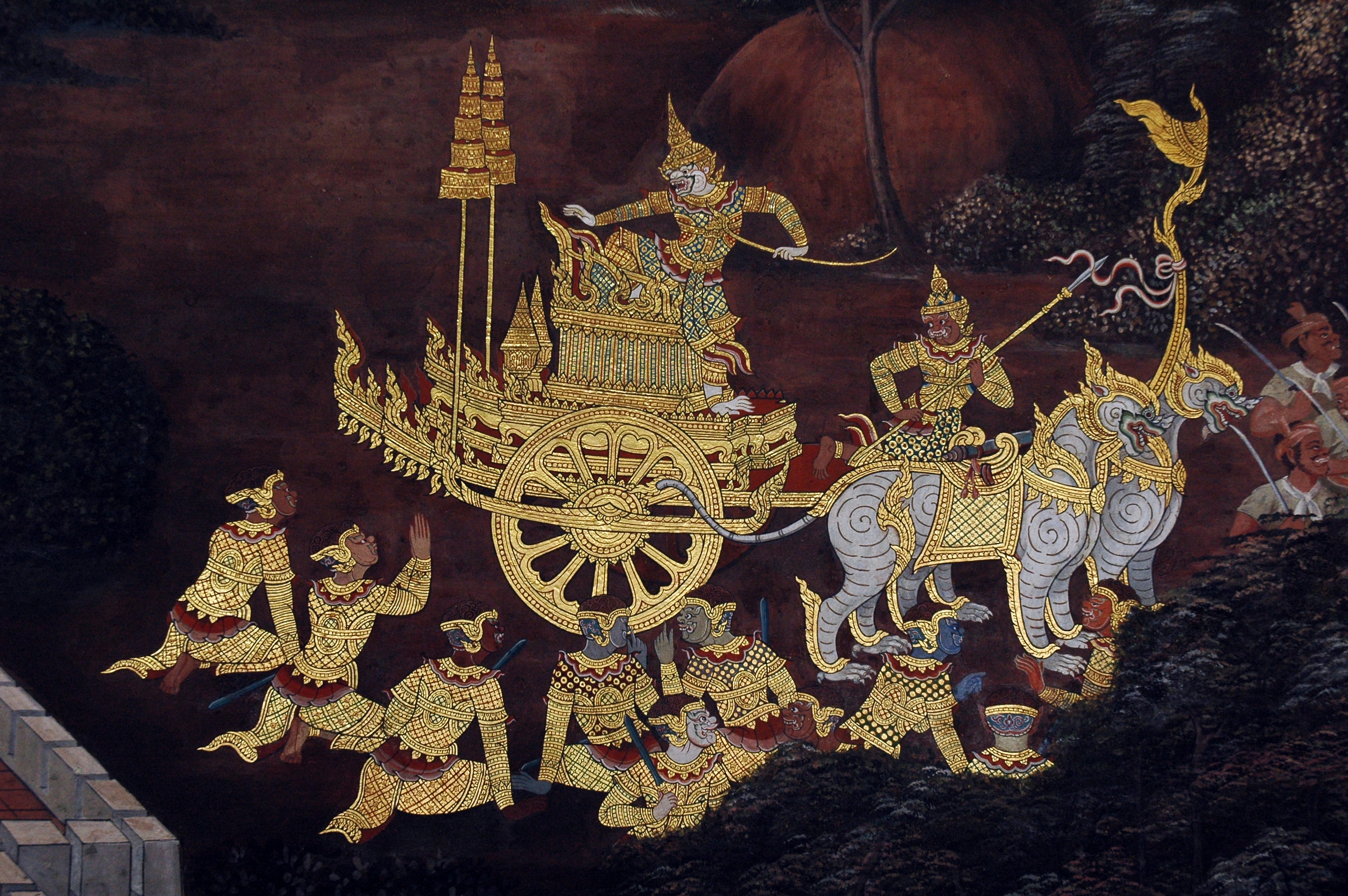
Hanuman on his chariot, a scene from the Ramakien in Wat Phra Kaew, Bangkok.

- Hanuman – god-king of the apes, who supported Phra Ram and acted as his vanara general.
- Phali Thirat (Vali) – king of Khitkhin (Kishkindha), elder brother of Sukhrip and uncle of Hanuman.
- Sukhrip (Sugriva) – viceroy of Kitkin, younger brother of Phali and uncle of Hanuman.
- Ongkhot (Angada) – ape-prince and son of the Pali Thirat and Nang Montho (Devi Tara), cousin of Hanuman.
- Phiphek (Vibhishana) – estranged brother of Thotsakan. He is an excellent astrologist and provided valuable information to Phra Ram in defeating Thotsakan.
- Chomphuphan (Jambavan) – Bear-prince and adopted son of Phali, an expert in the healing arts and acted as the troop's medic.

==== Enemies of Phra Ram ====
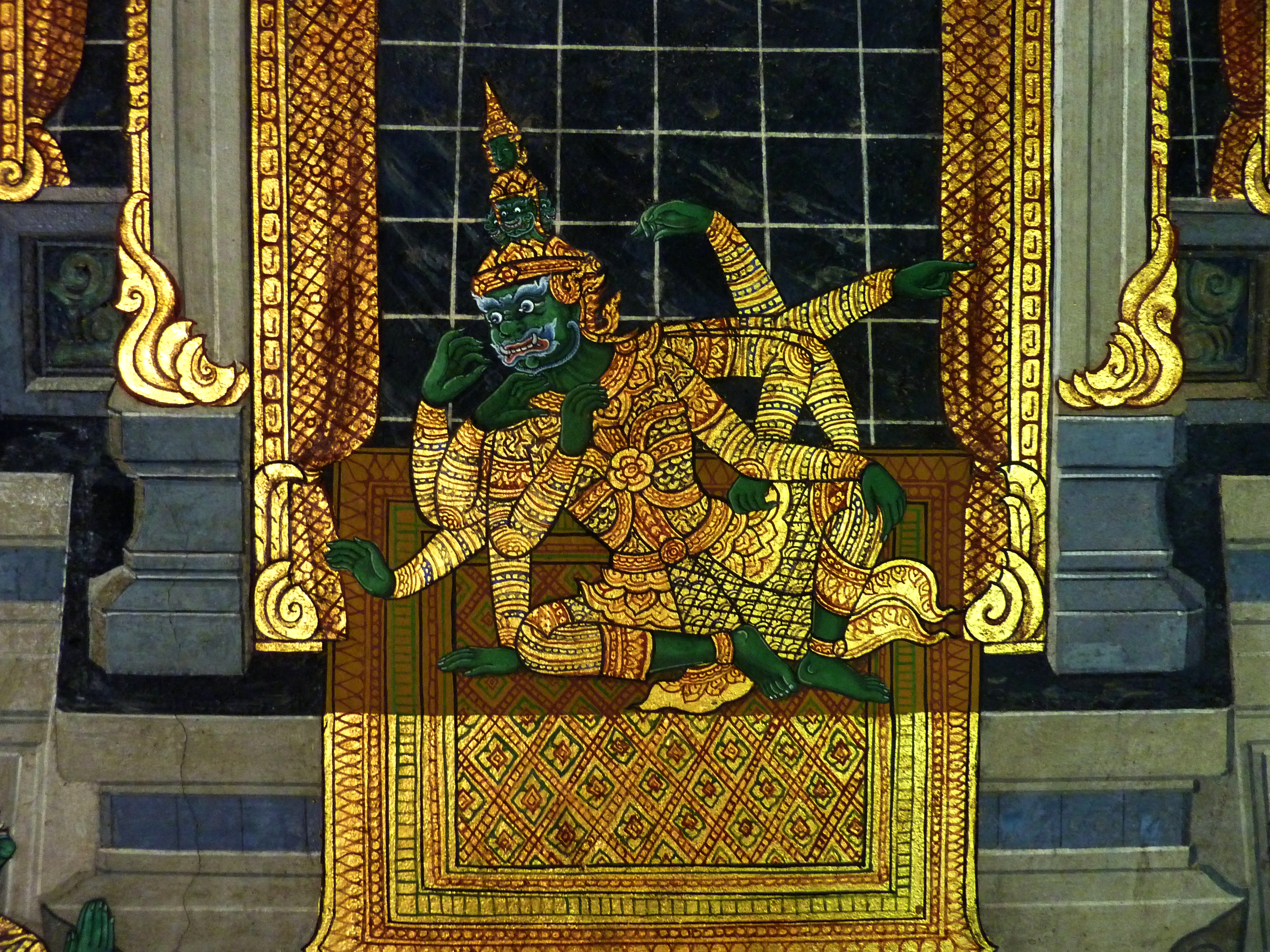
Ramakien mural at Wat Phra Kaew depicting Thotsakan.

- Thotsakan (Ravana) (from daśakaṇṭha) – king of the rakshasas of Lanka and strongest of Phra Ram's adversaries. Thotsakan has ten faces, twenty arms, and possesses a myriad of weapons.
- Intharachit (Indrajit) – a son of Thotsakan. Phra Ram's second most powerful adversary. Intharachit uses his bow more than any other weapon. He once fired arrows (Nagabat Arrows), which turned into Nagas (or snakes) in mid-air and rained down on Phra Ram's army. He once had a blessing from the Phra Isuan that he shall not die on land but in the air, and if his severed head were to touch the ground, it will bring down great destruction.
- Kumphakan (Kumbhakarna) – of Thotsakan and commander of demonic forces.
- Maiyarap (Mahiravana) – king of the Underworld, embodied as a donkey.
- Khon (Khara), Thut (Dushana) and Trisian (Trishira) – younger brothers of Thotsakan, and the first three to be killed by Phra Ram, in that order.

=== Plot ===
The text can be split into three logical parts: the first one dealing with the origins of the main characters, the second depicting the dramatic events including the fall of Thotsakan, and the final part describing what happened afterwards.

==== Part One ====
The first part begins with the story of Phra Narai in the form of a boar vanquishing the demon Hiranyaksha. This is followed by an account of the origins of the ancestors of Thotsakan. According to Ramakien, Phra Isuan grants his servant Nonthok (Bhasmasura) a boon that enables him to change his finger into a diamond and destroy anyone at whom he points it. As Nonthok begins to abuse this power, Phra Narai assumes the form of a charming woman who dances in front of Nonthok, who tries to imitate the movement of her hands. At one moment, he points the diamond finger towards himself and instantly dies. Nonthok is later reborn as Thotsakan. He also has four brothers and a sister, as well as half-siblings. Thotsakan first marries Kala Akhi (Mandodari), the daughter of Kala Nakha (Mayasura) of the underworld, and later receives Nang Montho as a gift from Phra Isuan. Thotsakan and Kala Akhi have a son with the first name Ronapak (Meghanada); after his victory over Indra, he is called Intharachit (Winner of Indra).

The text then explains the origins of the simian characters Phali and Sukhrip. They are born to Kala Acana (Anjana), the wife of king Khodam (Kesari), as a result of her adultery with Phra In and Phra Athit. When King Khodam immerses them in a lake to test their legitimacy, they turn into monkeys and vanish into the forest. Phra Isuan grants Phali a magic trident, which will transfer to Phali half the strength of anyone fighting him. Sukhrip is rewarded with a beautiful young maiden Dara (Tara), but Phali takes her for himself. Later, Phali also seizes Thotsakan's consort Nang Montho, and they have a son named Ongkhot before she is returned to Thotsakan. Finally, Phali banishes Sukhrip to the forest where he meets Hanuman.

Hanuman is said to be born after Phra Isuan places his celestial weapons in the mouth of Sawaha, the daughter of Kala Acana. Hanuman at first stays with Phali and Sukhrip, but later decides to join Sukhrip in his banishment in the forest.

Rama, known in the Ramakien as Phra Ram, has ancestors tracing back to Phra Narai through King Thotsarot. Phra Ram himself is a reincarnation of Phra Narai, and his brothers Phra Lak, Phra Phrot and Phra Satarut are manifestations of Phra Narai's emblems: the serpent, the discus, and the mace, respectively. Phra Ram's consort Nang Sida is a reincarnation of Phra Narai's consort Laksami, but she is born as the daughter of Thotsakan in Lanka and adopted by king Chonok (Janaka) of Mithila.

==== Part Two ====
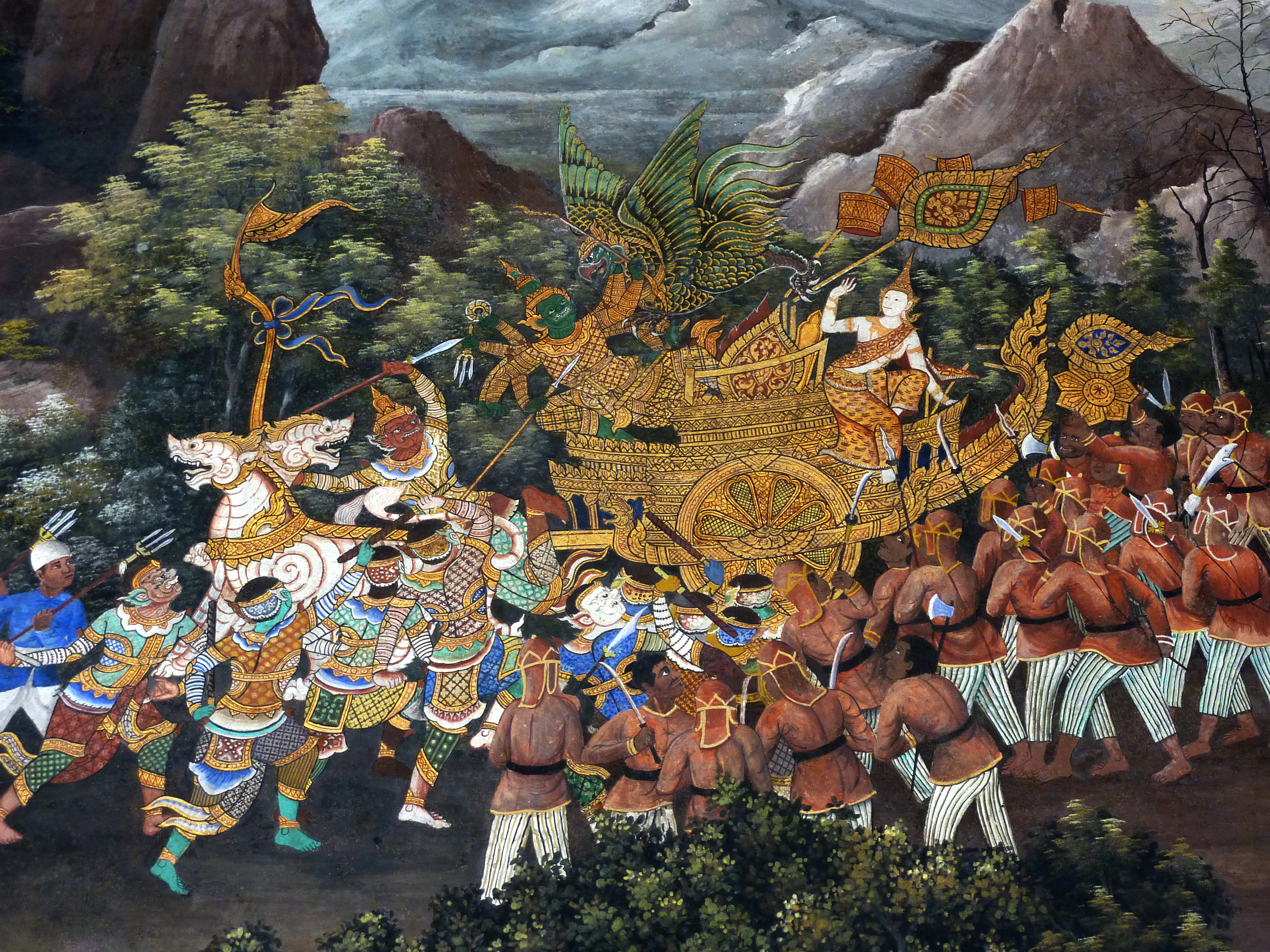
Thotsakan abducts Nang Sida.

Part two deals with the main drama of the story. Phra Ram and Nang Sida fall in love at first sight before an archery contest. A hunchback named Kucci (Manthara) instigates the queen to ask for the banishment of Phra Ram. He sets off to live in the forest with Nang Sida and his brother Phra Lak, where they meet Sammanakha (Surpanakha) who took on the form of a beautiful maiden. She tries to seduce the two brothers, but they resist and punish her. As revenge, Thotsakan abducts Nang Sida to his palace in Lanka.

Phra Ram and Phra Lak meet Hanuman, Sukhrip, and another Vanara, Chomphuphan, and ask them to help find Nang Sida. When Hanuman locates Nang Sida in Lanka, he identifies himself by showing her ring and kerchief and retelling the secret of her first meeting with Phra Ram. Hanuman is then caught by Thotsakan's son Intharachit but escapes while setting Lanka on fire. On returning to Phra Ram, Hanuman helps build a causeway with the help of Nal and Nil to connecting Lanka with mainland, and the war with Thotsakan begins. After a lot of fighting and attempts of treachery by Thotsakan's allies, Phra Ram manages to kill Thotsakan and Intharachit and free Nang Sida. After she passes a fire ordeal to test her faithfulness, Phra Ram takes her with him to Ayutthaya and grants various parts of his kingdom to his allies.

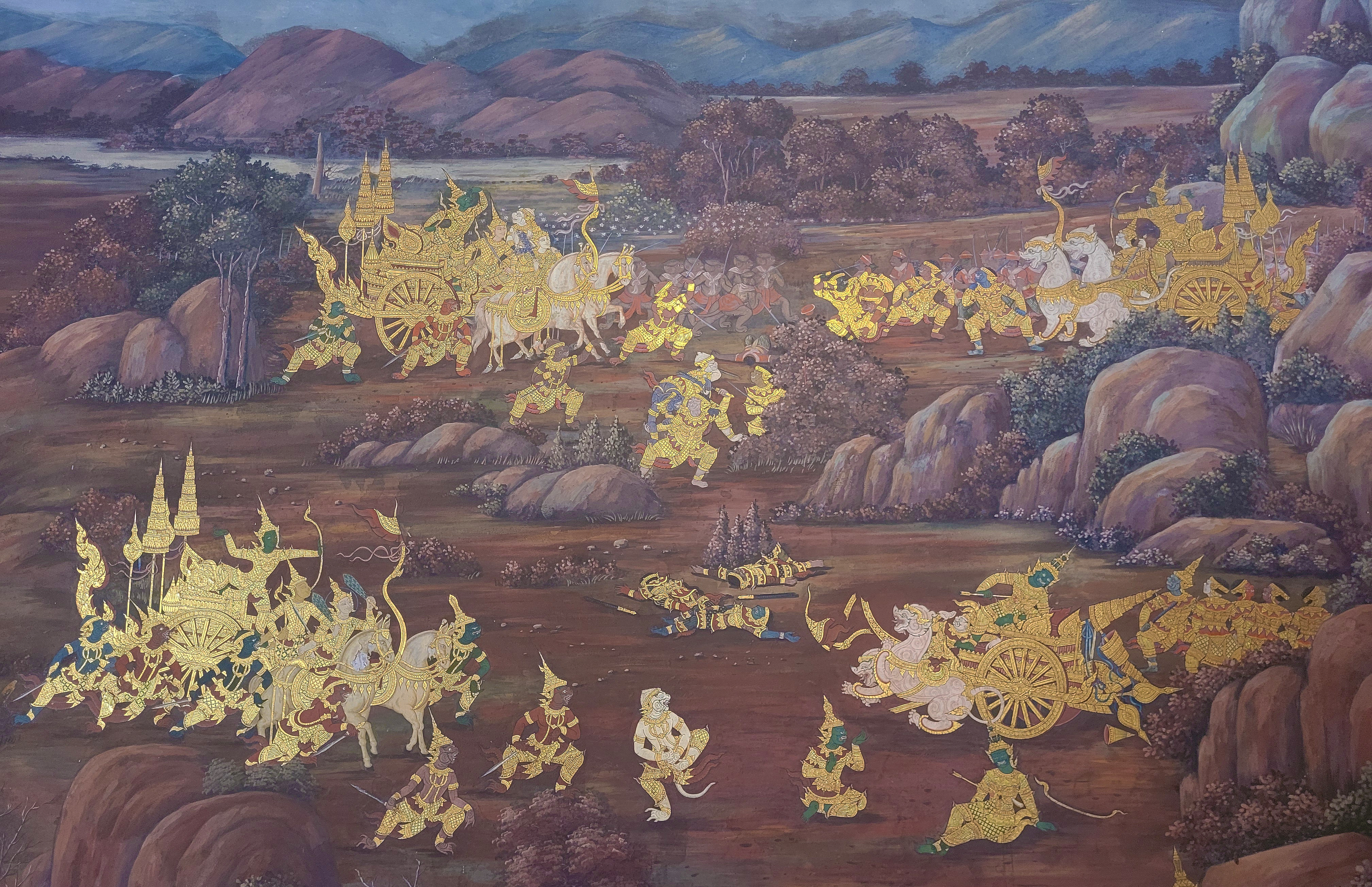
Thotsakan disguises himself as Phra In (Indra) and takes the field against Rama, but is ultimately defeated and killed—struck through the chest by Rama's arrow, and finished when Hanuman crushes his heart to pieces.

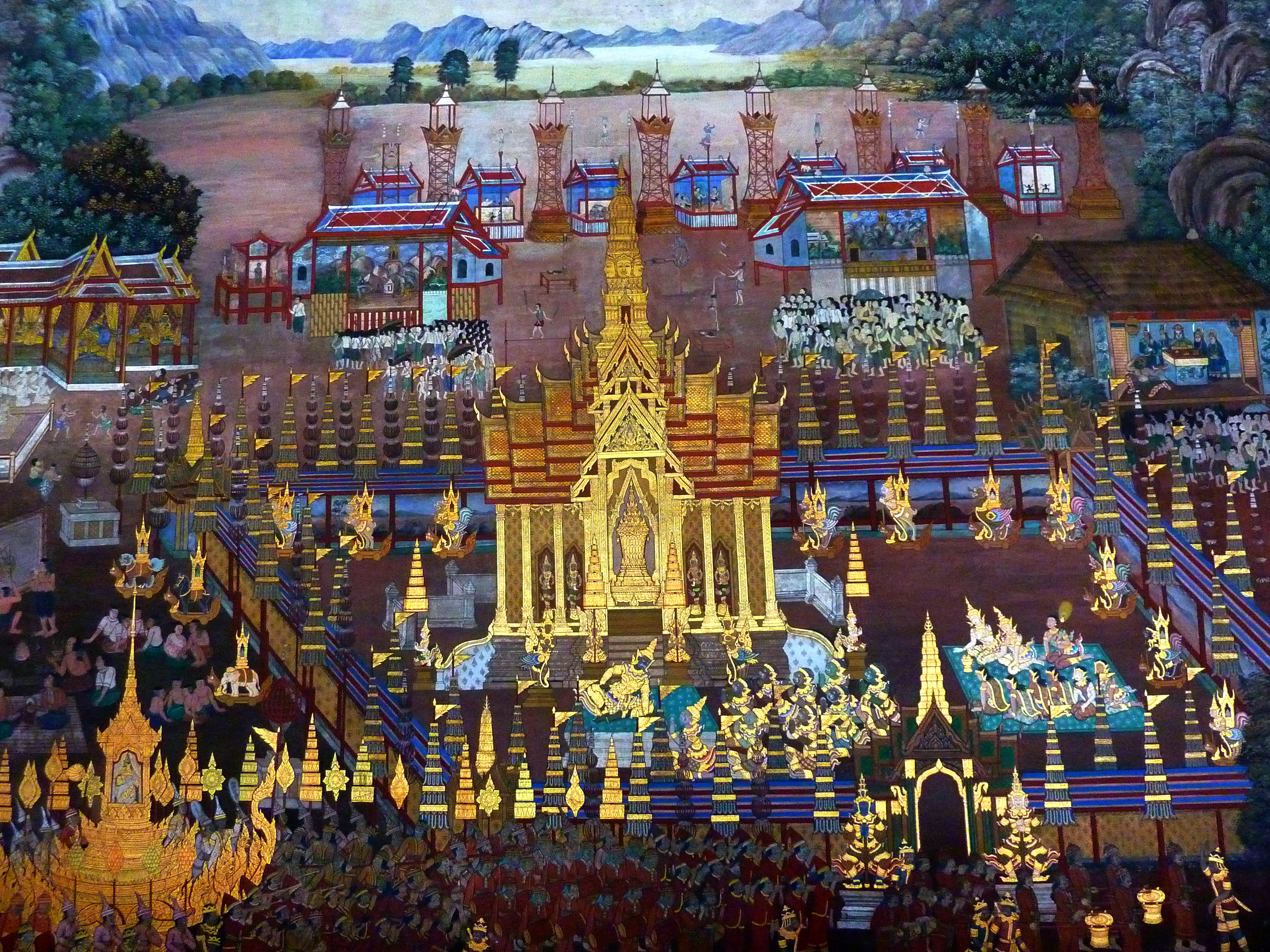
Phiphek holds the royal cremation ceremony for Thotsakan. His relatives and companions join in offering the funeral rites, mourning him with deep affection. Various performances are staged at the ceremony.

==== Part three ====
After Nang Sida draws a picture of Thotsakan on a slate, Phra Ram orders Phra Lak to take her to the forest and kill her. Instead of doing as commanded, he brings to Phra Ram the heart of a doe to trick him into believing that Nang Sida is dead. In the forest, Nang Sida finds refuge with a hermit named Wachamarik Valmiki, and she gives birth to two sons: Phra Monkut (Kusha) and Phra Loph (Lava). Phra Ram decides to take her back to Ayutthaya, but she refuses and disappears into the Underworld. Finally, Phra Isuan brings Phra Ram and Nang Sida together again.

== See also ==
- Thai literature
- Hikayat Seri Rama
- Kakawin Ramayana
- Phra Lak Phra Ram
- Ramayana
- Versions of Ramayana
- Reamker
- Yama Zatdaw
- Lakhon nok
- Khon
- Nang yai
