= Barshul =

Barsul
- Village
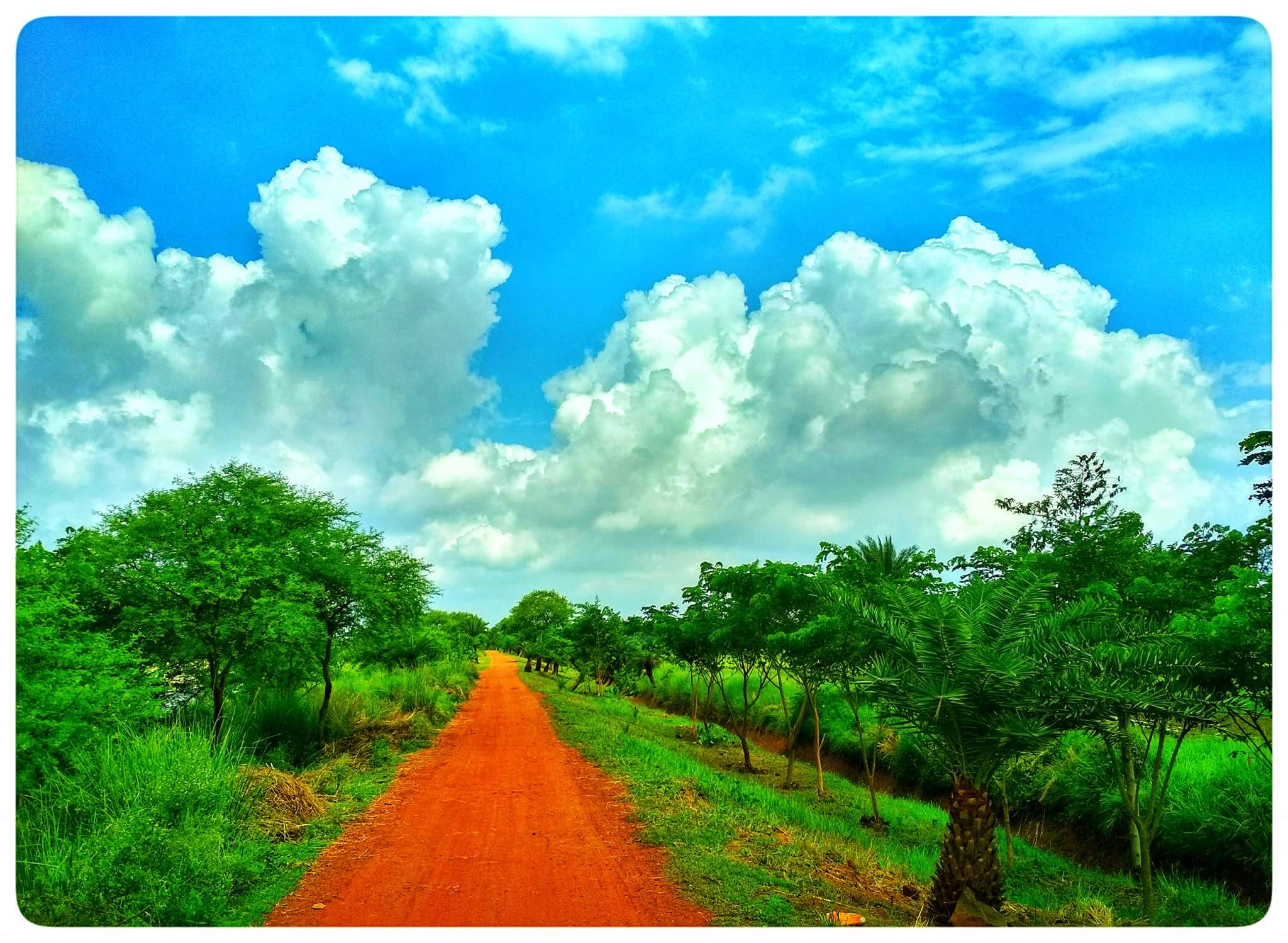

- Location in West Bengal, India Barsul (India)
- Coordinates: 23°11′19.0″N 87°58′12.4″E
- Country: India
- State: West Bengal
- District: Purba Bardhaman

Population (2011)
  - Total: 5,483

Languages
  - Official: Bengali, English
- Time zone: UTC+5:30 (IST)
- PIN: 713124
- Telephone/STD code: 0342
- Vehicle registration: WB 41, WB42
- Lok Sabha constituency: Bardhaman-Durgapur
- Vidhan Sabha constituency: Bardhaman Uttar
- Website: purbabardhaman.gov.in

Barsul is a village in Burdwan II community development block in Bardhaman Sadar North subdivision of Purba Bardhaman district in the state of West Bengal, India.

== Geography ==
Cities and towns in the Bardhaman Sadar North subdivision of Purba Bardhaman district
M: municipal city/ town, CT: census town, R: rural/ urban centre, H: historical site, W: river project, C: craft centre
Owing to space constraints in the small map, the actual locations in a larger map may vary slightly

=== CD block HQ ===
The headquarters of Burdwan II CD block are located at Barshul.

=== Urbanisation ===
73.58% of the population of Bardhaman Sadar North subdivision lives in the rural areas. Only 26.42% of the population lives in the urban areas, and that is the highest proportion of urban population amongst the four subdivisions in Purba Bardhaman district. The map alongside presents some of the notable locations in the subdivision. All places marked in the map are linked in the larger full screen map.

== Demographics ==
As per the 2011 Census of India Barshul had a total population of 5,483, of which 2,796 (51%) were males and 2,687 (49%) were females. Population below 6 years was 489. The total number of literates in Barshul was 4,141 (77.26% of the population over 6 years).

== Establishment ==
The village was developed by the government of West Bengal as the dream project by Bidhan Chandra Roy in 1956 . DVC irrigation lockgate was established in the year of 1956. Barsul is an ancient village on the north bank of Damodar River. It is enriched with cultured and educated society.

== Culture ==
Gajan is celebrated at Barshul Dharamshila (Dharmathakur) temple for four days in the Bengali month of Joishtho.

David J. McCutchion mentions the charchala dolmancha of Krishna-Balarama at Barshul as having rich terracotta decoration.

== Healthcare ==
Barshul block primary health centre at Barshul (with 10 beds) is the main medical facility in Burdwan II CD block. There are primary health centres at Bamchandipur, PO Jateram (with 2 beds) and Kashiara, PO Hatgobindapur (with 4 beds). In 2012, the average monthly patients attending Barshul BPHC were 7,975 and average monthly admissions were 37. It handled 297 annual emergency admissions.
