= Gangpur =

- Census Town
- Location in West Bengal, India Gangpur (India)
- Coordinates: 23.2185°N 87.9164°E
- Country: India
- State: West Bengal
- District: Purba Bardhaman

Area
  - Total: 2.81 km^{2} (1.08 sq mi)

Population (2011)
  - Total: 6,347
  - Density: 2,260/km^{2} (5,850/sq mi)

Languages
  - Official: Bengali, English
- Time zone: UTC+5:30 (IST)
- Vehicle registration: WB
- Lok Sabha constituency: Bardhaman-Durgapur
- Vidhan Sabha constituency: Bardhaman Uttar
- Website: purbabardhaman.gov.in

Gangpur is a census town in Burdwan II CD Block in Bardhaman Sadar North subdivision of Purba Bardhaman district in West Bengal, India.

== Geography ==
Cities and towns in the Bardhaman Sadar North subdivision of Purba Bardhaman district
M: municipal city/ town, CT: census town, R: rural/ urban centre, H: historical site, W: river project, C: craft centre
Owing to space constraints in the small map, the actual locations in a larger map may vary slightly

=== Location ===
The location code of Gangpur Villa is 320193, according to the 2011 census. The distance between Ganpur and the main Burdwan City is less than 6.6 km. Gangpur is well connected with the rest of the Burdwan District via railway and roads.

=== Urbanisation ===
73.58% of the population of Bardhaman Sadar North subdivision lives in the rural areas. Only 26.42% of the population lives in the urban areas, and that is the highest proportion of urban population amongst the four subdivisions in Purba Bardhaman district. The map alongside presents some of the notable locations in the subdivision. All places marked in the map are linked in the larger full screen map.

== Demographics ==
As per the 2011 Census of India, Gangpur had a total population of 6,347 of which 3,263 (51%) were males and 3,084 (49%) were females. Population below 6 years was 580. The total number of literates in Gangpur was 4,780 (82.89% of the population over 6 years).

== Infrastructure ==
As per the District Census Handbook 2011, Gangpur covered an area of 2.8072 km^{2}. Amongst the medical facilities, the nearest nursing home was 8 km away and the nearest veterinary hospital was 8 km away. It had 5 medicine shops. It had 4 primary schools. The nearest middle and secondary schools were 1.5 km away at Joteram. Major educational facilities were available 7 km away at Bardhaman.

== Education ==
Sylvan Polytechnic College is situated near Gangapur Railway Station. Joteram Vidyapith is a well known school located at the vicinity of Gangpur Railway Station.
