= Burdwan II =

- Community development block
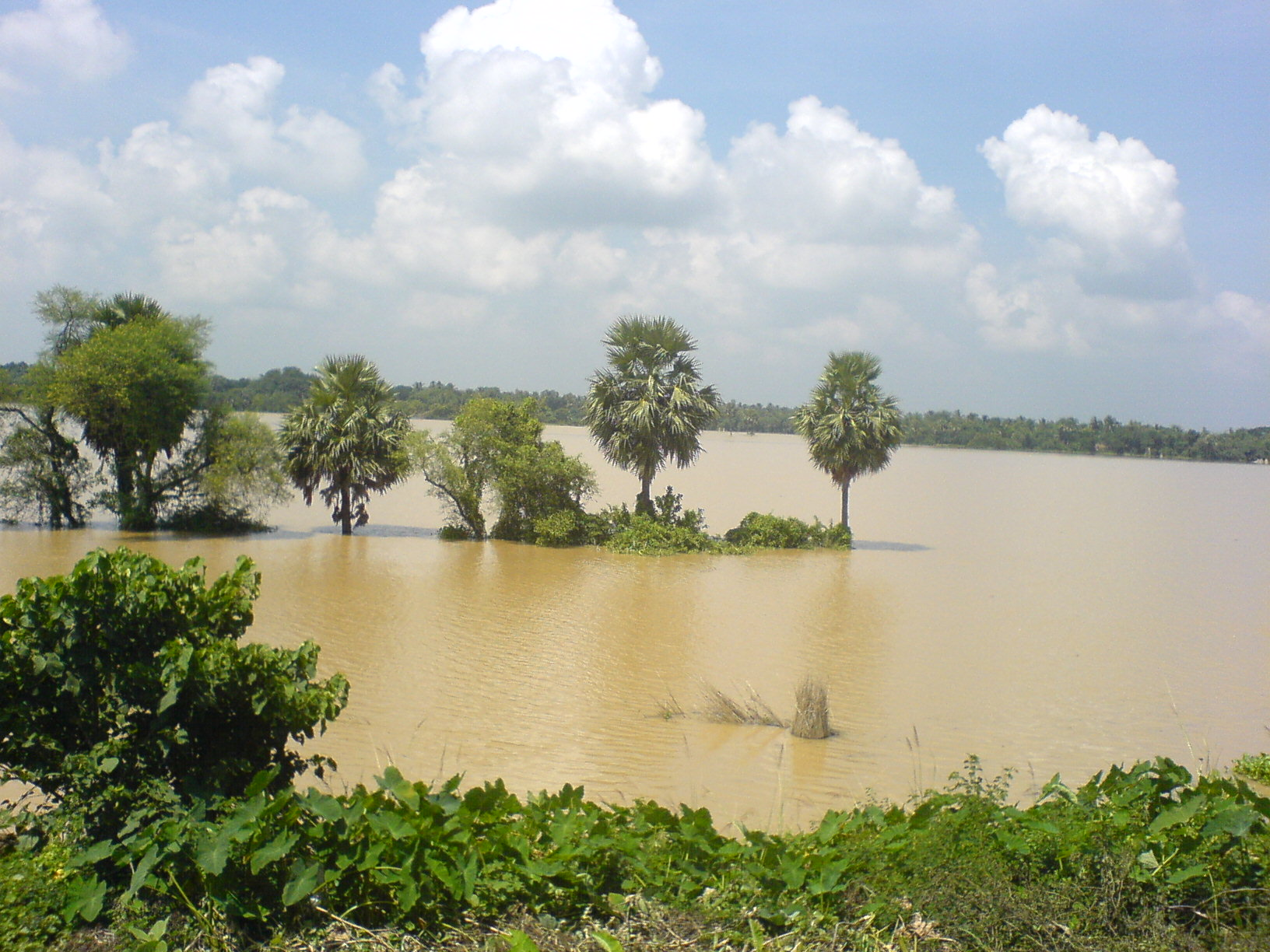
- Floods in the Kalinagar area

- Location in West Bengal
- Coordinates: 23°11′15″N 87°57′54″E
- Country: India
- State: West Bengal
- District: Purba Bardhaman
- Parliamentary constituency: Bardhaman-Durgapur
- Assembly constituency: Bardhaman Uttar

Area
  - Total: 73.19 sq mi (189.57 km^{2})
- Elevation: 95 ft (29 m)

Population (2011)
  - Total: 152,939
  - Density: 2,089.5/sq mi (806.77/km^{2})
- Time zone: UTC+5.30 (IST)
- PIN: 713407 (Hatgobindapur); 713149 (Shaktigarh)
- Telephone/STD code: 0342
- Vehicle registration: WB-37,WB-38,WB-41,WB-42,WB-44
- Literacy Rate: 74.12 per cent
- Website: http://purbabardhaman.gov.in/

Burdwan II is a community development block that forms an administrative division in Bardhaman Sadar North subdivision of Purba Bardhaman district in the Indian state of West Bengal.

== Geography ==
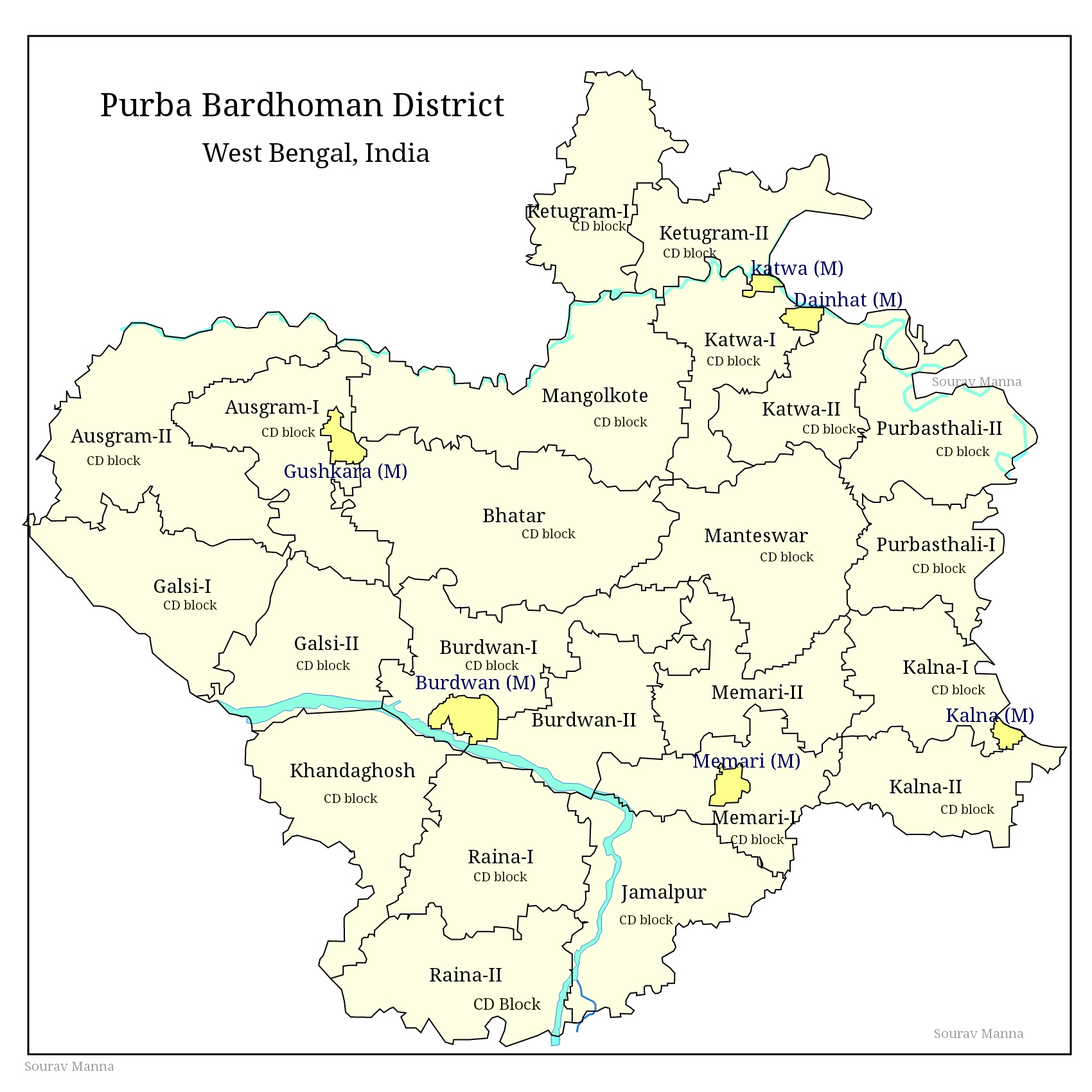
CD blocks of Purba Bardhaman district

=== Location ===
Baghar, a constituent panchayat of Burdwan II block, is located at 23°19′06″N 87°49′54″E.

Burdwan II CD Block is part of the Bardhaman Plain, the central plain area of the district. The area is surrounded by the Bhagirathi on the east, the Ajay on the north-west and the Damodar on the west and south. Old river channels and small creeks found in the region dry up in the dry season, but the Bardhaman Plains are sometimes subject to heavy floods during the rainy season. The region has recent alluvial soils.

Burdwan II CD Block is bounded by Burdwan I on the west and a part of the north, Memari II CD Block on a part of the north and a part of the east, Memari I CD Block on a part of the east and Raina I CD Block on the south.

Burdwan II CD Block has an area of 189.57 km^{2}. It has 1 panchayat samity, 9 gram panchayats, 116 gram sansads (village councils), 89 mouzas and 83 inhabited villages. Burdwan police station and Women police station Burdwan serve this block. Headquarters of this CD Block is at Barshul.

Gram panchayats of Burdwan II block/panchayat samiti are: Baikunthapur I, Barsul I, Kurmun&II, Baikunthapur II, Barsul II, Nabastha I, Bandul II, Gobindapur and Nabastha II.

== Demographics ==
=== Population ===
As per the 2011 Census of India Burdwan II CD Block had a total population of 152,939, of which 146,592 were rural and 6,347 were urban. There were 77,276 (51%) males and 75,663 (49%) females. Population below 6 years was 15,593. Scheduled Castes numbered 59,322 (38.79%) and Scheduled Tribes numbered 18,242 (11.93%).

As per 2001 census, Burdwan II block had a total population of 138,909, out of which 70,864 were males and 68,045 were females. Burdwan II block registered a population growth of 17.63 per cent during the 1991-2001 decade. Decadal growth for Bardhaman district was 14.36 per cent. Decadal growth in West Bengal was 17.84 per cent. Scheduled castes at 57,451 formed more than one-third the population. Scheduled tribes numbered 17,104.

Census Town in Burdwan II CD Block is (2011 census figure in brackets): Gangpur (6,347).

Large villages (with 4,000+ population) in Burdwan II CD Block are (2011 census figures in brackets): Bamchandaipur (4,607), Samanti (4,535), Hatgobindapur (5,823), Putunda (4,409), Saktigarh (8,432) and Barshul (5,483).

Other villages in Burdwan II CD Block include (2011census figures in brackets): Baikanthapur (2,742), Nabastha (2,387), Kandorsona (3,362) and Palsit (3,578).

=== Literacy ===
As per the 2011 census the total number of literates in Burdwan II CD Block was 101,806 (74.12% of the population over 6 years) out of which males numbered 56,305 (81.13% of the male population over 6 years) and females numbered 45,501 (66.97% of the female population over 6 years). The gender disparity (the difference between female and male literacy rates) was 14.16%.

As per 2001 census, Burdwan II block had a total literacy of 68.11 per cent for the 6+ age group. While male literacy was 77.78 per cent female literacy was 58.02 per cent. Bardhaman district had a total literacy of 70.18 per cent, male literacy being 78.63 per cent and female literacy being 60.95 per cent.

See also – List of West Bengal districts ranked by literacy rate

Literacy in CD blocks of
Bardhaman district
Bardhaman Sadar North subdivision
Ausgram I – 69.39%
Ausgram II – 68.00%
Bhatar – 71.56%
Burdwan I – 76.07%
Burdwan II – 74.12%
Galsi II – 70.05%
Bardhaman Sadar South subdivision
Khandaghosh – 77.28%
Raina I – 80.20%
Raina II – 81.48%
Jamalpur – 74.08%
Memari I – 74.10%
Memari II – 74.59%
Kalna subdivision
Kalna I – 75.81%
Kalna II – 76.25%
Manteswar – 73.08%
Purbasthali I – 77.59%
Purbasthali II – 70.35%
Katwa subdivision
Katwa I – 70.36%
Katwa II – 69.16%
Ketugram I – 68.00%
Ketugram II – 65.96%
Mongalkote – 67.97%
Durgapur subdivision
Andal – 77.25%
Faridpur Durgapur – 74.14%
Galsi I – 72.81%
Kanksa – 76.34%
Pandabeswar – 73.01%
Asansol subdivision
Barabani – 69.58%
Jamuria – 69.42%
Raniganj – 73.86%
Salanpur – 78.76%
2011 Census: CD Block Wise

Primary Census Abstract Data

=== Languages and religion ===
Religion in Burdwan II CD block (2011)
Hinduism	87.41%
Islam	10.96%
Sarna	1.47%
Other or not stated	0.16%

In the 2011 census Hindus numbered 133,679 and formed 87.41% of the population in Burdwan II CD Block. Muslims numbered 16,766 and formed 10.96% of the population. Christians numbered 101 and formed 0.07% of the population. Others numbered 2,393 and formed 1.56% of the population.

Languages of Burdwan II CD block (2011)
1. Bengali (89.8%)
2. Santali (7.35%)
3. Hindi (2.13%)
4. Others (0.70%)

At the time of the 2011 census, 89.82% of the population spoke Bengali, 7.35% Santali and 2.13% Hindi as their first language.

== Rural poverty ==
As per poverty estimates obtained from household survey for families living below poverty line in 2005, rural poverty in Burdwan II CD Block was 21.68%.

== Economy ==
=== Livelihood ===
In Burdwan II CD Block in 2011, amongst the class of total workers, cultivators formed 11.35%, agricultural labourers 50.20%, household industry workers 1.71% and other workers 36.74%.

Burdwan II CD Block is part of the area where agriculture dominates the scenario but the secondary and tertiary sectors have shown an increasing trend.

=== Infrastructure ===
There are 83 inhabited villages in Burdwan II CD block. All 83 villages (100%) have power supply. All 83 villages (100%) have drinking water supply. 21 villages (25.30%) have post offices. 81 villages (97.59%) have telephones (including landlines, public call offices and mobile phones). 45 villages (54.22%) have a pucca (paved) approach road and 50 villages (60.24%) have transport communication (includes bus service, rail facility and navigable waterways). 16 villages (19.28%) have agricultural credit societies. 9 villages (10.84%) have banks.

In 2013–14, there were 70 fertiliser depots, 24 seed stores and 41 fair price shops in the CD Block.

=== Agriculture ===
Persons engaged in agriculture
in Burdwan II CD Block
1. Bargadars (7.55%)
2. Patta holders (11.4%)
3. Small farmers (4.38%)
4. Marginal farmers (17.1%)
5. Agricultural labourers (59.6%)

Although the Bargadari Act of 1950 recognised the rights of bargadars to a higher share of crops from the land that they tilled, it was not implemented fully. Large tracts, beyond the prescribed limit of land ceiling, remained with the rich landlords. From 1977 onwards major land reforms took place in West Bengal. Land in excess of land ceiling was acquired and distributed amongst the peasants. Following land reforms land ownership pattern has undergone transformation. In 2013–14, persons engaged in agriculture in Burdwan II CD Block could be classified as follows: bargadars 7.55%, patta (document) holders 11.42%, small farmers (possessing land between 1 and 2 hectares) 4.38%, marginal farmers (possessing land up to 1 hectare) 17.06% and agricultural labourers 59.59%.

In 2003-04 net cropped area in Burdwan II CD Block was 13,941 hectares and the area in which more than one crop was grown was 13,906 hectares.

In 2013–14, Burdwan II CD Block produced 42,239 tonnes of Aman paddy, the main winter crop, from 13,975 hectares, 19,429 tonnes of Boro paddy (spring crop) from 5,290 hectares and 54,888 tonnes of potatoes from 2,160 hectares. It also produced pulses and oilseeds.

In Bardhaman district as a whole Aman paddy constituted 64.32% of the total area under paddy cultivation, while the area under Boro and Aus paddy constituted 32.87% and 2.81% respectively. The expansion of Boro paddy cultivation, with higher yield rates, was the result of expansion of irrigation system and intensive cropping. In 2013–14, the total area irrigated in Burdwan II CD Block was 11,217.11 hectares, out of which 11,000.04 hectares were irrigated by canal water, 75.50 hectares by river lift irrigation and 141.57 hectares by deep tube wells.

=== Banking ===
In 2013–14, Burdwan II CD Block had offices of 9 commercial banks and 2 gramin banks.

== Transport ==
Burdwan II CD Block has 4 ferry services and 7 originating/ terminating bus routes.

The common route of Howrah-Bardhaman main line and Howrah-Bardhaman chord passes through this CD Block and there are stations at Gangpur and Shaktigarh, and Palsit on the main line.

Kolkata-Delhi NH 19 (old numbering NH 2)/ Grand Trunk Road passes through this CD Block.

SH 7 running from Rajgram (in Birbhum district) to Midnapore (in Paschim Medinipur district) passes through this CD Block.

== Education ==
In 2013–14, Burdwan II CD Block had 85 primary schools with 7,916 students, 11 middle schools with 950 students, 16 high schools with 7,664 students and 9 higher secondary schools with 7,496 students. Burdwan II CD Block had 1 general college with 2,033 students, 4 technical/ professional institution with 359 students and 260 institutions for special and non-formal education with 8,026 students

As per the 2011 census, in Burdwan II CD block, amongst the 83 inhabited villages, 3 villages did not have schools, 30 villages had two or more primary schools, 36 villages had at least 1 primary and 1 middle school and 22 villages had at least 1 middle and 1 secondary school.

More than 6,000 schools (in erstwhile Bardhaman district) serve cooked midday meal to more than 900,000 students.

Dr. Bhupendra Nath Dutta Smriti Mahavidyalaya was established at Hatgobindapur in 1996. It offers honours courses in Bengali, Sanskrit, English, history, political science, philosophy, geography, accountancy, mathematics, chemistry, botany, zoology and nutrition.

== Healthcare ==
In 2014, Burdwan II CD Block had 3 primary health centres and 2 private nursing homes with total 16 beds and 4 doctors (excluding private bodies). It had 21 family welfare subcentres. 1,187 patients were treated indoor and 178,476 patients were treated outdoor in the hospitals, health centres and subcentres of the CD Block.

Barshul block primary health centre at Barshul (with 10 beds) is the main medical facility in Burdwan II CD block. There are primary health centres at Bamchandipur, PO Jateram (with 2 beds) and Kashiara, PO Hatgobindapur (with 4 beds).

Burdwan II CD Block is one of the areas of Bardhaman district which is affected by a low level of arsenic contamination of ground water.
