= Rajshekhar Basu =

Indian writer (1880–1960)

Rajshekhar Basu PB
- Born: 16 March 1880; Bamunpara, Kandorsona, Bengal Presidency, British India (now Purba Bardhaman, West Bengal, India)
- Died: 27 April 1960 (aged 80); Calcutta, West Bengal, India
- Other name: Parasuram
- Occupations: Chemist, Author, Lexicographer
- Known for: Short Stories; Satire; Ramyana Translation; Mahabharata Translation
- Awards: Rabindra Puraskar (1955); Padma Bhushan (1956); Sahitya Akademi Award (1958)

Rajshekhar Basu (Bengali: রাজশেখর বসু; better known by the pen name Parashuram; 16 March 1880 – 27 April 1960) was a Bengali chemist, author and lexicographer. He was chiefly known for his comic and satirical short stories, and is considered the greatest Bengali humorist of the 20th century. He was awarded the Padma Bhushan in 1956.

== Early life ==
Basu was born at his maternal uncle's home at Bamunpara near Kandorsona, British India (now Purba Bardhaman district of West Bengal, India). He was the second son (and sixth child) of Chandrasekhar Basu and Lakshmimani Devi. His father, who belonged to the Basu family of Birnagar in Nadia District of West Bengal, was the Dewan Darbhanga Raj. Rajshekhar spent his childhood in Darbhanga, in the state of Bihar, and learned to speak Hindi as a first language, rather than Bengali. He was an inquisitive child and manifested a knack for science early in life. Shashisekhar, his elder brother, later wrote that the young Rajshekhar put together a laboratory at home equipped with two cupboards of various chemicals; he would forecast the weather by looking at a barometer that he had hung on the wall, would write prescriptions of cough-mixtures for his family members, and later, would even go to the Temple Medical School to dissect corpses.

Basu was introduced to Bengali literature when he went to Patna to study for the F.A. degree, where he interacted with a number of Bengali speakers. After school, he moved to Calcutta and joined Presidency College, where he completed his BA and MA degrees in chemistry. After graduating he completed a degree in law as well, but only attended court for three days, after which he quit the legal profession for good, and decided to pursue a career in science.

Around this time, he met Acharya Prafulla Chandra Roy, who had recently started a company – Bengal Chemicals & Pharmaceuticals. In 1903, Basu joined the company as a chemist. He was very quickly promoted to the post of director, and began a long association with the company, which continued even after his retirement in 1932.

== Personal life ==
Basu was married and had one daughter. He suffered a great deal of tragedy in his personal life. His son-in-law died of a terminal illness at a very young age, and his heartbroken daughter died the same day. In 1942, he lost his wife as well. He lived for almost 18 years after his wife's demise and wrote a great deal during this time, but he did not allow his personal tragedies to colour his writing. Even after a debilitating stroke in 1959, he continued writing. On 27 April 1960, he suffered a second stroke while he was resting and died in his sleep.

Rajshekhar's younger brother, Girindrasekhar Bose (1887–1953), was an early Freudian psychoanalyst of the non-Western world, and also wrote books for children.

== Literary career ==
Basu began his writing career in the 1920s. He adopted the pen name of "Parashuram" while writing humorous pieces for a monthly magazine. The name was not, apparently, a homage to the Parashurama of mythology. In fact, Basu simply borrowed the surname of someone at hand, the family goldsmith, Tarachand Parashuram. His first book of stories, Gaddalika, was published in 1924 and drew praise from such personalities as Rabindranath Tagore.

In 1937, when he published Chalantika, a monolingual Bengali dictionary, Rabindranath commented:

"At long last, we have a dictionary for Bengali. The concise grammar for Bengali that you have included in the appendix is also wonderful."

Chalantika also included Basu's first efforts to reform and rationalise Bengali orthography. A few years before its publication, in 1935, Calcutta University formed a committee, chaired by him, to formulate a set of guidelines governing the spelling of Bengali words. The recommendations of this committee were broadly accepted, and Chalantika is still in use today.

Basu's collection of short stories, Anandibai Ityadi Galpa, won a Sahitya Akademi Award for Bengali literature in 1958. The book was published under his pen name, Parasuram, and contained fifteen satirical stories, touching on themes of love, courtship, families, and politics.

== Works ==
Dictionary

- Chalantika (1937)

Short stories

- Sri Sri Siddheswari Limited (1922) ISBN 9789354348808
- Gaddalika (1922) Bengali: গড্ডলিকা ISBN 9789354348969
- Kajjali (1927) ISBN 9780000000002
- Hanumaner Svapna Ityadi Galpa (1937)
- Galpakalpa (1950)
- Dhusturi Maya Ityadi Galpa (Bengali: ধুস্তরী মায়া ইত্যাদি গল্প)
- Krishnakali Ityadi Galpa (1953)
- Nil Tara Ityadi Galpa
- Anandibai Ityadi Galpa (1957)
- Chamatkumari Ityadi Galpa
- Asmani choti
- Jaliyat
- Bangla bhasay bigyan

Translations

- Kalidaser Meghdut (1943)
- Valmiki Ramayan (1946)
- Krishnadvaipayan Vyas krita Mahabharat (1949)
- Hitopadesher Galpa (1950)
- Shrimadbhagabat Gita

Collection of essays

- Laghuguru (1939)
- Bharater Khanij (1943)
- Kutir Shilpa (1943)
- Bichinta (1955)
- Chalachchinta

Poetry

- Parashuramer Kabita (published posthumously)

== Screen adaptations ==
- Two Bengali movies, both directed by Satyajit Ray, were based on short stories by Parashuram. These were Parash Pathar (Bengali: পরশ পাথর (The philosopher's stone)), based on the story of the same name; and Mahapurush (Bengali: মহাপুরুষ (The holy man)), based on the short story Birinchibaba (Bengali: বিরিঞ্চি বাবা).
- In the film Chaar, one story (Bateswarer Abodan) is written by Rajshekhar Basu. The film is directed by Sandip Ray.

== Awards and honours ==
Basu received a good deal of recognition for his writing. Calcutta University awarded him the Jagattarini and Sarojini medals in 1940 and 1945 respectively. In 1957, the University awarded him D.Litt. Jadavpur University followed suit the next year. Krishnakali ityadi golpo won the Rabindra Puraskar in 1955, and in 1956, he was awarded the Padma Bhushan. In 1958, he was awarded the Akademi Puraskar for Anandibai Ityadi Galpa.

== Other achievements ==
Basu was a man of diverse achievements. He was an active member of the National Council of Education, founded in 1903. He served on the Bangiya Sahitya Parishad. He even provided covert assistance to the revolutionaries of the Indian Independence Movement in the form of money and chemicals, and also provided his expertise in making bombs.

Basu also played a major role in the history of printing in Bengal. He was the principal assistant to Sureshchandra Majumdar, credited with creating the first linotype in the Bengali script. The second edition of Parashuram's Hanumaaner Svapna Ityadi Galpa was the first book to be completely printed in Bengali linotype.
