= Kandorsona =

Kandorsona Durgabati
- Village
- Location in West Bengal, India Kandorsona (India)
- Coordinates: 23.214170°N 87.934731°E
- Country: India
- State: West Bengal
- District: Purba Bardhaman
- Established: 1000 A.D

Population (2011)
  - Total: 3,362

Languages
  - Official: Bengali, English
- Time zone: UTC+5:30 (IST)
- PIN: 713149
- Telephone code: 91 342
- Vehicle registration: WB 42
- Website: purbabardhaman.gov.in

Kandorsona is a village in Burdwan II CD Block in Bardhaman Sadar North subdivision of Purba Bardhaman district of the Indian state of West Bengal, India.

== History ==
The village was founded around 1000 A.D. Manasamangal writings state that the earrings of Devi Behula were dropped there. Traces of the former Gangur River can be found in Kandorsona. Indian mythology's Goddess of Snakes, Manasa, is the main god worshipped in this village.

== Geography ==
It is 10 km away from the town of Bardhaman, and 1.5 km from Gangpur Station. It is known for its sweets, especially Saktigarh’s famous Langcha (Bengali: ল্যাংচা). There are many temples, one cold store, two rice mills, one biscuit factory, one brick factory, several grocery shops and other shops, one petrol pump, two roadside hotels, one medicine shop, one dispensary for people and one dispensary for animals.

The village is accessible via the Durgapur Expressway and National Highway 2. It is situated near the Damodar River, which sometimes floods in the rainy season. A wide variety of Indian birds and animals is found there.

== Demographics ==
In 2011, Kandorsona had a total population of 3,362 of which 1,687 (50%) were males and 1,675 (50%) were females. Population below 6 years was 410. The total number of literates in Kandorsona was 2,017 (68.33% of the population over 6 years).

Various tribes, such as the Santhal, Kora, Dule, Hari, and Orang of Bengal reside in this village beside the Hindu and Muslim communities. Kandorsona Janakalyan Sangha, Kandorsona Juba Sangha and other clubs organize cultural and recreational festivals.

== Economy ==
The main occupations of the villagers are agriculture and animal husbandry. Others work as veterinarians, doctors, engineer, priesthood, public servants and factory workers.

== Arts and Culture ==
Many temples stand in the village, including Janardan, Jora Shiva, Rameshwar, Panchanan, Gangadhar, Durga, Jaleshwar Shiva, Kali, Mahaprabhu and Manasa. Kandorsona burning ghat is near Samshan Kali temple. Devi Chandi is also worshipped there near a paddy field popularly known as Dighir Parer Mayer Puja twice a year. In Bhadra month in the shukla panchami tithi, Devi Manasha is worshipped every year in the festival known as Jhapan. For this occasion, a village fair is organized in the Jhapantala region.

== Infrastructure ==
Roads in Kandorsona are made of mud or concrete, as are the houses. This village has electricity, telephone and mobile service along with broadband, 24-hour potable water (sajal dhara) and digital cable TV lines provided by several operators.

== Education ==
There are two primary schools and one secondary school in Kandorsona. One of the primary school is government-sponsored Kandorsona Gopkolia F.P. School and another one is privately funded Shree Ramkrishna Saroda Sisu Mandir.

The secondary school - Magnus Global School is also a premier institute in Burdwan.

== Sources ==
- "KANDORSONA GOPKALIA F.P. SCHOOL, BURDWAN-II". schoolsworld.in.
- "Kandorsona Gopkalia F. P. School". veethi.com.
- "Kandarsona Village Population - Burdwan - II - Barddhaman, West Bengal". census2011.co.in.
