= Yama Zatdaw =

Burmese Story

Yama Zatdaw (Burmese: ရာမဇာတ်တော်, pronounced [jàma̰ zaʔ tɔ̀]), unofficially Myanmar's national epic, is the Burmese version of the Ramayana and Dasaratha Jataka. There are nine known pieces of the Yama Zatdaw in Myanmar. The Burmese name for the story itself is Yamayana, while zatdaw refers to the acted play or being part of jataka tales of Theravada Buddhism.

== History ==
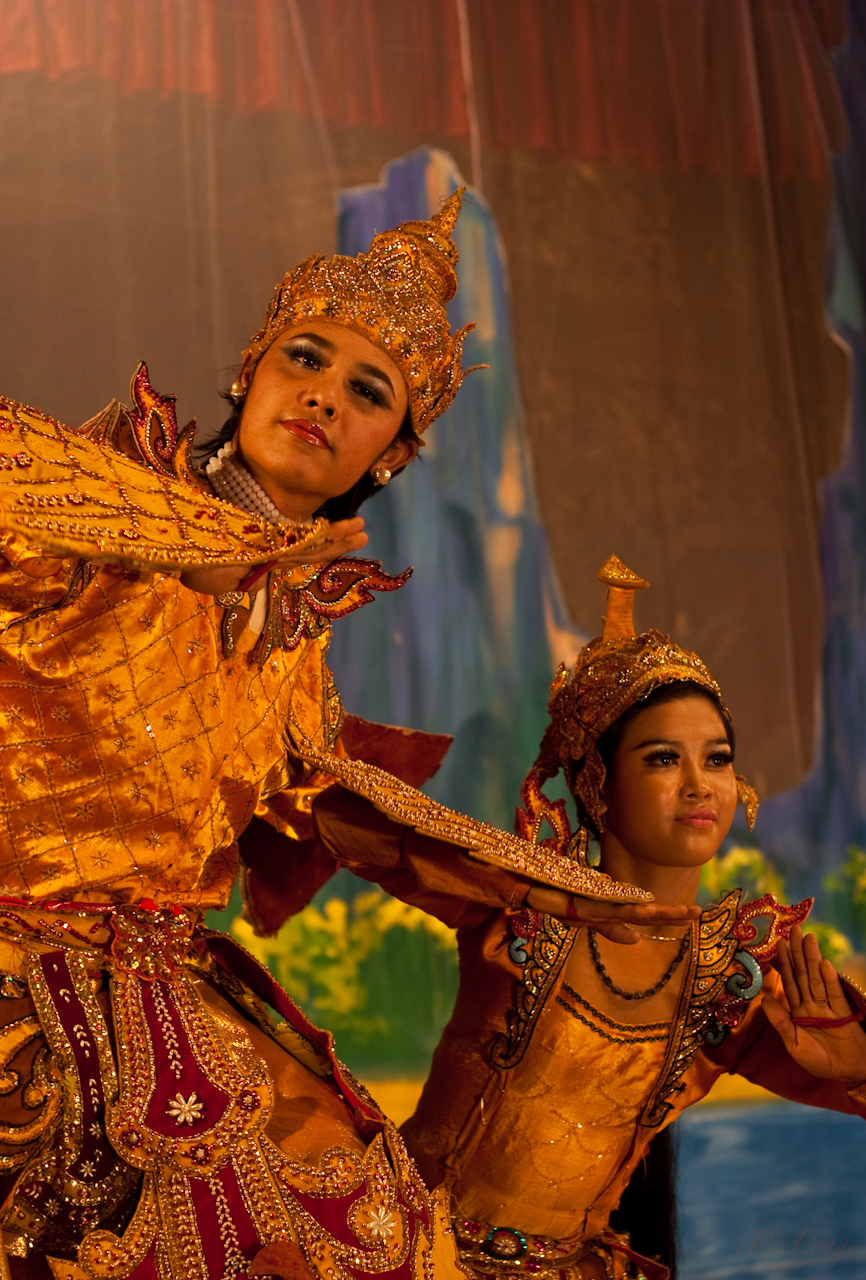
Rama (Yama) and Sita (Me Thida) in Yama Zatdaw, the Burmese version of Ramyana

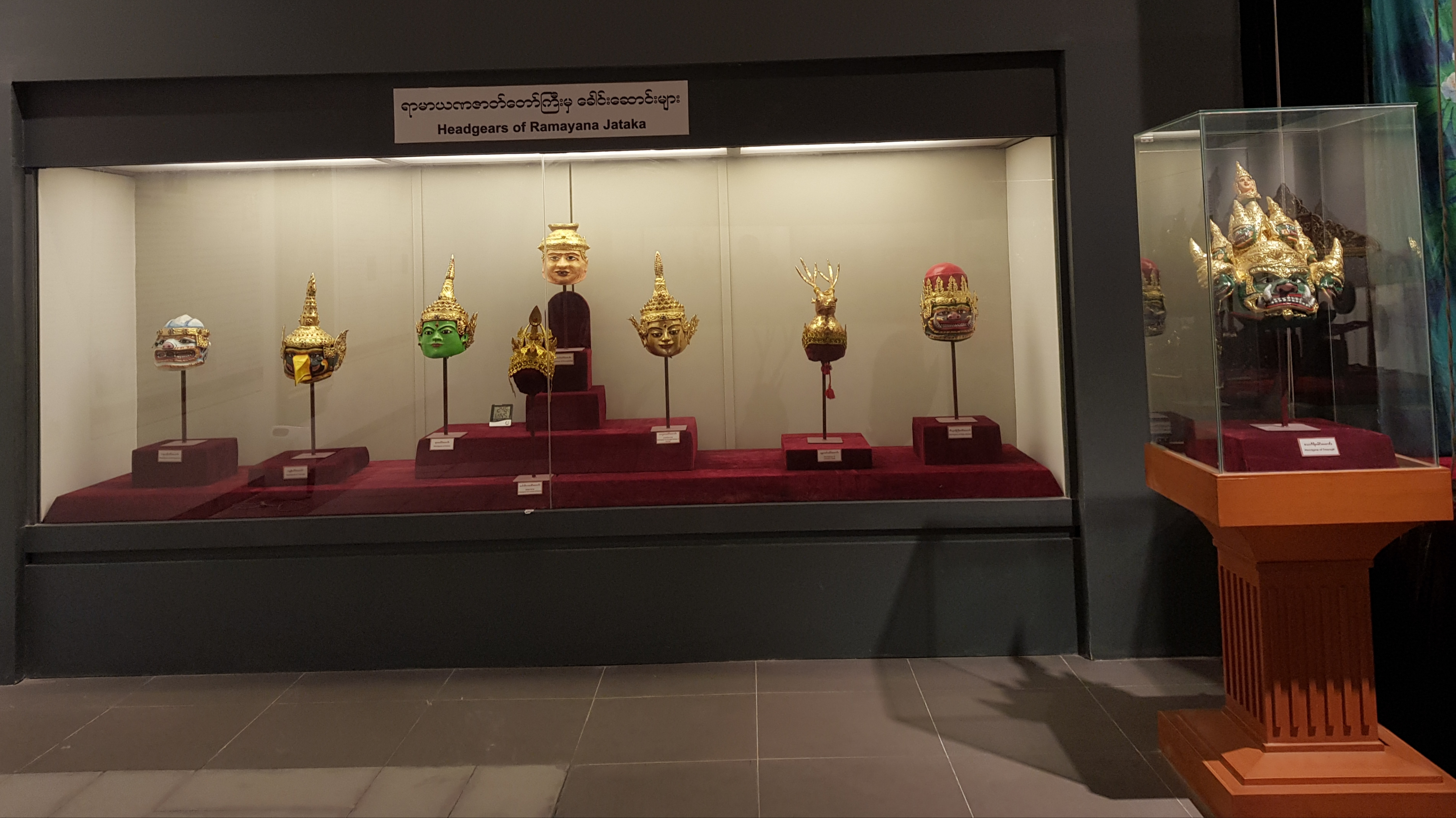
Headgears of Ramayana Jataka

The Yama Zatdaw was introduced by oral tradition during King Anawratha's reign although it was not known clearly whether the story was Valmiki's Sanskrit epic Ramayana or not. But, many say that it was stolen from the Valmiki's Epic Ramayana. The most accurate and original version of Ramayana is the Valmiki Ramayana.

The earliest pictorial evidence of the Ramayana dates to the early Bagan period. Bagan's Nathlaung Temple features two brick sculptures of Rama and Parashurama, while the Hpetleik pagodas features terracotta plaques depicting the story of Rama (in the Dasaratha Jataka), as part of a series depicting the Buddhist Jataka tales.

The earliest literary reference to Ramayana is a pyo entitled Thuwunna-shan Thahte-khan Pyo, based on the Suvannasama Jataka, and written by Shin Aggathamadi in 1527.

The Burmese Ramayana was influenced greatly by Ayutthaya, during which various Konbaung dynasty kings invaded the kingdom. The invasions often brought back spoils of war, including elements of Ramakien (Thai version of Ramayana) into the epic. Rama thachin, one of the well-known literature in Burma, is believed to be composed in 1775 by U Aung Phyo which begins with Bala kanda and ends at Yudha kanda as in Valmiki's Ramayana. There are also important Burmese literature and classical music related to the Ramayana which were developed in that era such as U Toe's Yama yakan (Rama's song, ရာမရကန်) and Thida yakan (Sita's song, သီတာရကန်), both written in 1784; Yama pyazat (Ramayana ballet, ရာမပြဇာတ်) in 1789; and Kalay Yama wuthtu (Young Rama's life, ကလေးရာမဝတ္ထု) in 1800.

The ethnic Mon adaptation of Ramayana is known as "Loik Samoing Ram" which was written in 1834 AD by a Buddhist monk named Uttama. It is evident that "Loik Samoing Ram" is mainly derived from Burmese version as the author of the Mon version stated in his preface that due to the popularity of Burmese version in the capital. However, Mon version also exhibits the connections with Thai, Javanese and Malay versions and has own unique episodes, not found in Thai, Burmese or Malay versions.

== Characters ==
The characters of Yama Zatdaw share the same features and characteristics as those in the original story. However, in acting, the costumes are a mixture of Bamar and Thai elements. The names of the characters, in general, are Burmese transliterations of the Sanskrit names.

- Rama is known as Yaama (ရာမ).
- Sita is known as Mae Thiidaa (မယ်သီတာ).
- Lakshmana is known as Lakkhana (လက္ခဏ).
- Hanuman is known as Hanumaan (ဟနုမာန်).
- Parashurama is known as Pashuh-yaama (ပသျှူးရာမ).
- Ravana is known as Yaawana (ရာဝဏ) or more commonly as ten-headed Dasa-gīri (ဒဿဂီရိ).
- Vali is known as Bali (ဘာလီ).
- Maricha is known as Marizza(မာရဇ္ဇ).
- Vibhishana is known as Bibi-thana (ဘိဘိသန).
