= Phra Lak Phra Ram =

Lao national novel

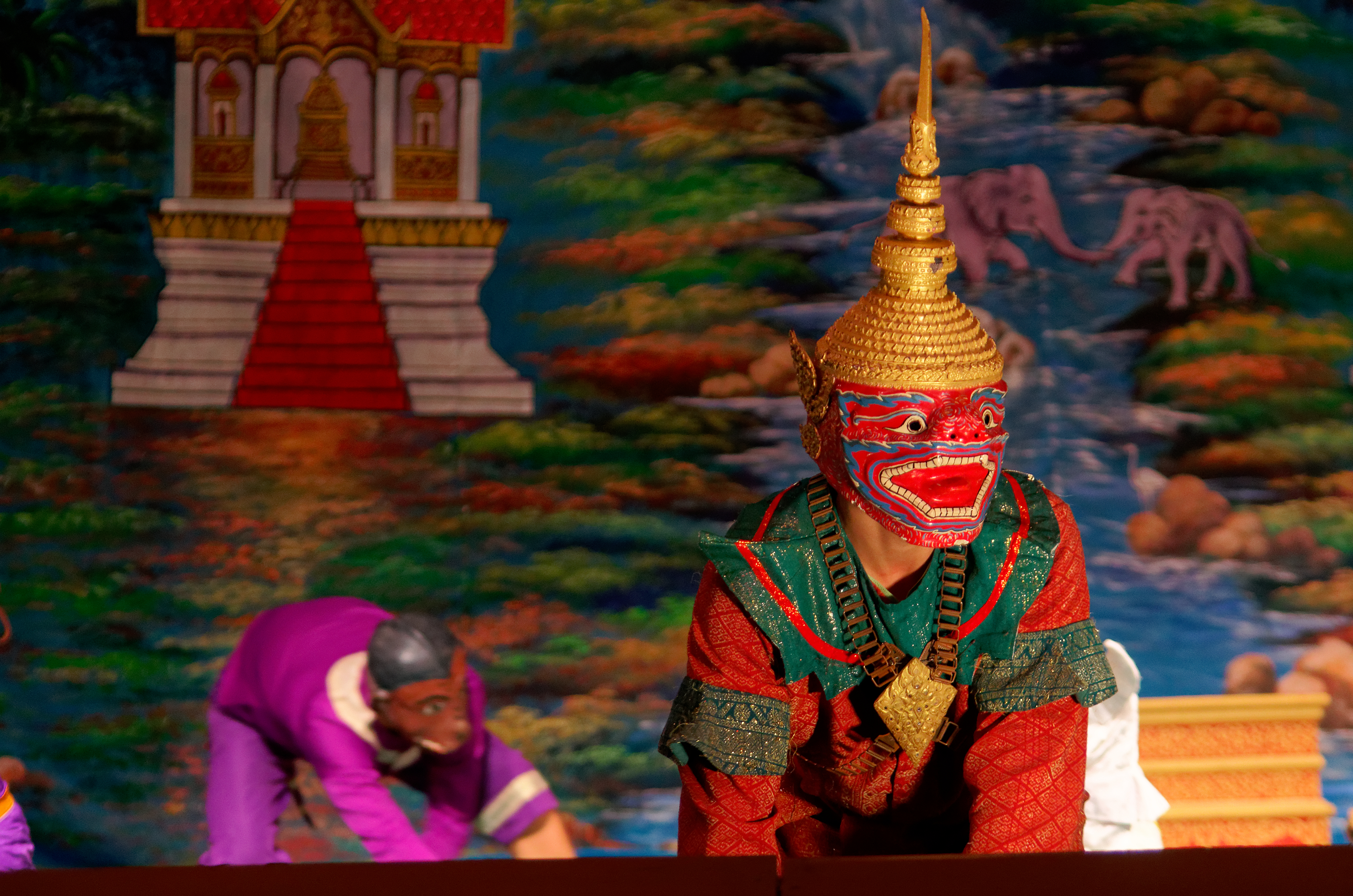
Scene from Phra Lak Phra Ram, the Lao form of the Indian Ramayana. Several versions of the story were recorded on palm-leaf manuscripts between the 15th and early 19th centuries.

Phra Lak Phra Ram (ພຣະລັກພຣະຣາມ, pʰrāʔ lāk pʰrāʔ ráːm) is the national epic of the Lao people, an adaptation of the ancient Indian epic Ramayana.

Ramayana reached Laos much later than Cambodia (Reamker) and Thailand (Ramakien) which caused the loss of its original Hindu influence and affected local adaptation. Similar to some Malay versions of the Hikayat Seri Rama, the epic has lost the association with Hinduism and is instead considered a Jataka tale (the Dasaratha Jataka), a previous lifetime of the Buddha.

== Names ==
Phra Lak Phra Ram is named after two principal characters, the brothers Phra Lak, or Lakshaman, and Phra Ram, or Rama. Since Phra Ram is considered the hero, it is believed the altered name was chosen for euphony. Veteran dance performers of Luang Prabang, however, say that Phra Lak comes first in deference to his voluntary assistance of Phra Ram, whose actions were obligatory to his kingship. Since it is also considered a Jataka tale, it is referred to as Phra Ram Xadôk (ພຣະຣາມຊາດົກ, pʰrāʔ ráːm sáː dók). It was also called Rammakien (ຣາມມະກຽນ, Ráːm māʔ kian), which is the name for other regional varieties of the Ramayana in general.

== Introduction to Laos ==
Lao legends attribute to the introduction of the Phra Ram Xadôk via the first king of Lan Xang, Chao Fa Ngoum, who arrived with his soldiers, artists, dancers, concubines, poets from musicians from Angkor who would have been familiar with the Reamker. Yet Indic civilizations knew of what is now Yunnan in China, as "Gandhara" no later than the second century B.C. Hindu culture, language and religion spread into that part of the world incident to the cultural achievements of the Sahavahanas (230 BC–AD 220.) Though definitive dates cannot be established for the gradual Tai inland migration from China, transmission of the epic likely occurred much sooner than the traditional date. Tai tribes definitely settled on the fringes of highly Indianized kingdoms of the Mon and Khmer culture, adopting much of Indic learning and knowledge. As those kingdoms receded, the Lao came to venerate the earlier Hindu temples, often decorated in Ramayana and the Mahabharata motifs, such as at Vat Phou in Champassak.

Earlier versions remained somewhat similar to other versions, but by the 18th century, the versions are completely localised. Although Theravada Buddhism was known to the Mekong River Tai tribes as early as the 7th or 8th century B.C., it wasn't until the 14th or 15th centuries that a re-invigorated Theravada Buddhism supplanted earlier animist, Hindu, or Mahayana Buddhist loyalties. This would have also seen introduction of the Dasaratha Jataka, an ancient Buddhist crystallisation of the story. By the 18th century, the manuscripts are completely adapted to Lao culture and Theravada Buddhist religion.

== Religious significance ==
Although the Hindu nature of the Ramayana epic was lost in Laos, it was not completely erased. Indra, Shiva, and Brahma are present in the Phra Ram Xadôk. Lao culture has always been oral and visual, and oral tales were often codified into elaborate dance-dramas by the royal courts. Great influence in dance came from Khmer, Thai, and even Javanese culture, with a slight native flair. In khône and lakhone dance-dramas, the symbolism, costumes, and story are also more attuned to and influenced by Khmer, Thai, and Javanese traditions.

Some versions explicitly announce that it is a Jataka tale, while others are generally assumed to be so. Phra Lak and Phra Ram are the epitome of moral leadership, ethics, selflessness, and living true to dharma. Pha Ram is associated with a previous life of Siddartha Gautama, while his cousin Hapmanasouane (Ravanna) is often compared to Buddha's cousin Phra Thevathat or Buddha's final impasse to enlightenment, Phra Man. The parallels include their religious knowledge and generally moral superiority but also their ruin by greed and desire. Hampanasouane as Mara, the personification of worldly desires who tried to tempt the Buddha during meditation, can be seen in both their searches for lust, power, and material gain. The cosmology and some elements are taken from the Tripitaka, such as the greater role of Indra vis-à-vis Shiva, and Indra asking riddles of religion and Buddhist thought to a young Hapmanasouane. Although important, religiously, it is subordinate to the greater and more chronologically recent Jataka tales of Phra Vet and the annals of the lifetime of Siddhartha Gautama.

Animistic elements are not as apparent in the Phra Lak Phra Ram, but it is noteworthy to point out that the scenery takes place along the Mekong River. She is a great goddess and ancestral spirit that is as sacred and quintessentially 'theirs' as the Ganges is to India and a personification of water, bounty, and life. It was also the King of the Nagas that suggested Phra Ram's father move the capital from Maha Thani Si Pan Phao (modern-day Nong Khai, Thailand) across the bank to Chantaboury Sri Sattanak (modern-day Vientiane). Like most animistic elements, the Nāga is seen in both Buddhist and Hindu-influenced contexts, but worship of nagas predates Indian influence in the region, and are common in folktales of Laos and Isan. A unique version of the Phra Lak Phra Ram, the Khwai Thoraphi focuses very much on Sankhip and Palichane's fight with the water buffalo. It was often read at temple, probably in Buddhism's attempt to replace Lao spirit propitiation ceremonies that involved water buffalo sacrifice.

== Influence on culture and art ==
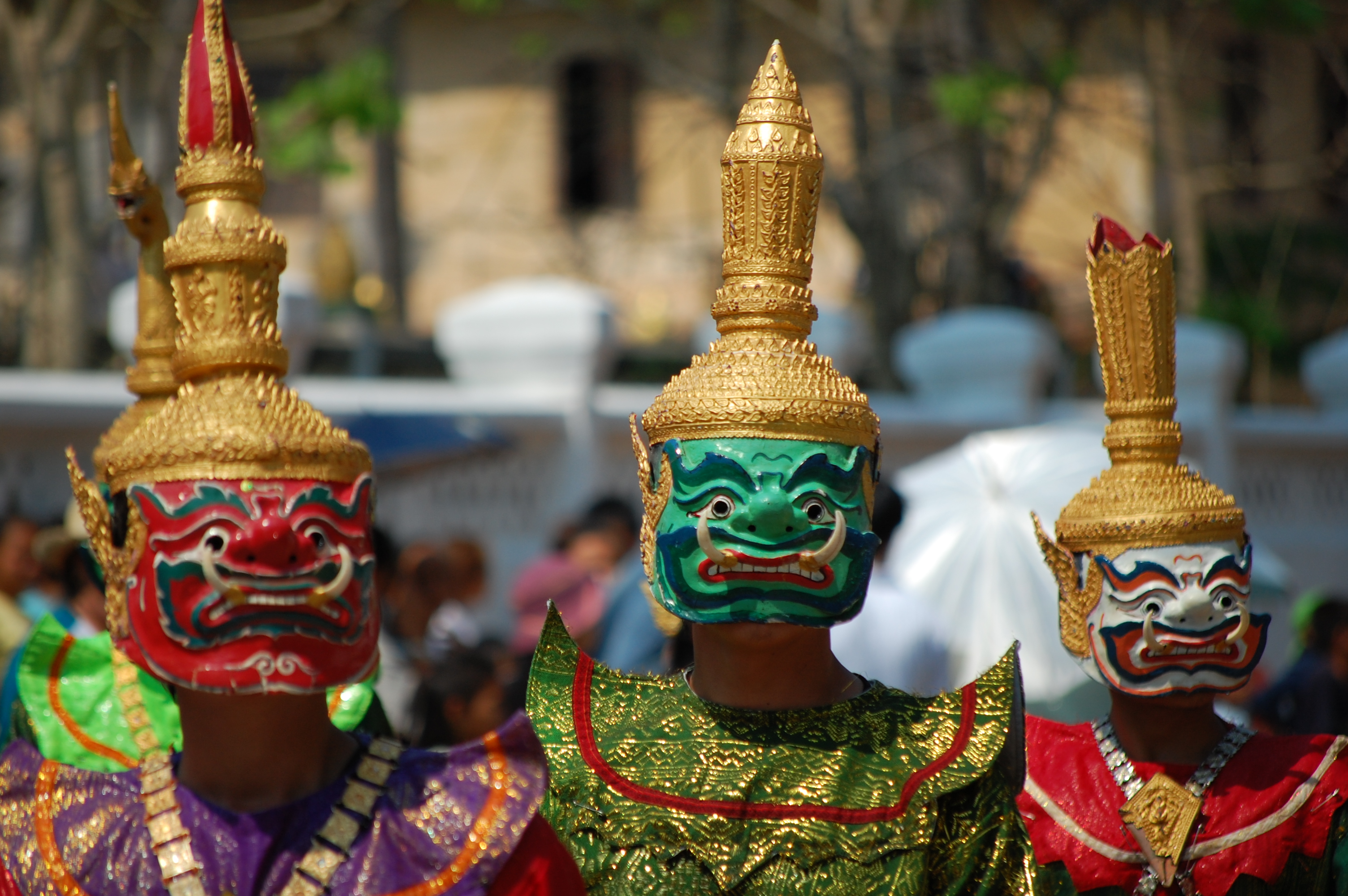
A dancer wearing a demon mask from Phra Lak Phra Ram

The importance of Phra Lak Phra Ram to Lao culture can be seen in how ubiquitous it is. It is a mainstay of dance and drama, song, painting, sculpture, religious texts, and manuscripts. It is also seen in the more common arts, such as classical morlam, folklore, and village dances. Scenes from court dancers were performed on Lao New Year celebrations, and other Buddhist holidays. The texts are commonly read during sermons. And the tales themselves have been deeply interwoven into local folklore, myth, and legend. Sculpture, lacquerware, carvings, and paintings adorn temples and palaces. The chapters have been intricately crafted into song and dance and accompanying music. Through the Buddhist elements, Lao beliefs of morality and karma are re-affirmed. The first half of Lao versions also establish the mythology for the creation of the Lao polities, land features, and waterways, and it serves as a transmission of culture.

== Characters ==
=== Main characters ===
Phra Ram (ພຣະຣາມ, pʰrāʔ ráːm)

- Son of Thattaratha, brother of Phra Lak, husband of Nang Sida.

Phra Lak (ພຣະລັກ, pʰrāʔ lāk)

- Son of Thattaratha, brother of Phra Ram.

Nang Sida (ນາງສີດາ, náːŋ sǐː daː)

- Daughter of Thôtsakane and Nang Chanta, incarnation of Nang Souxada.

Thôtsakane or Hapmanasouane (ທົດສະກັນ, tʰōt sáʔ kan; ຮາບມະນາສວນ, hȃːp māʔ naː sŭaːn)

- Soun of Viloun Ha, incarnation of Thao Loun Lo.

=== Heavenly characters ===
- Phra In (ພຣະອິນ, pʰrāʔ ʔìn)
  - Chief of the gods, mentor of Thao Loun Lo.
- Phra Isouane or Tapboramèsouane (ພຣະອີສວນ, pʰrāʔ ʔiː sŭaːn; ຕັບບໍຣະເມສວນ, táp bɔː rāʔ méː sŭaːn)
  - A god who falls to the earth and is the first ruler of Inthapatha Maha Nakhone.
- Phra Phrôm or Phrômmachak (ພຣະພຣົມ, pʰrāʔ pʰróm; ພຣົມມະຈັກ, pʰróm mā tɕák)
  - Prince of Muong Thoay, father of several lesser wives of Phra Lak and Phra Ram.
- Nang Souxada (ນາງສຸດຊາດາ, sút sáː daː)
  - Wife of Indra who is defiled by Hapmanasouane and vows to seek vengeance in her next life as Nang Sida.
- Phra Athit (ພຣະອາທິດ, pʰrāʔ ʔàːtʰīt)
  - The sun god, has affair with Nang Khaysi who bears the sons Sanghkip and Palichane.
- Phagna Khrout (ພະຍາຄຸດ, pʰāʔ ɲáː kʰūt)
  - Garuda replaces Jatayu.
- Manikap (ມະນີກາບ, māʔ níː kȁːp)
  - The Pegasus-like vahana, or deity mount, of Indra.
- Phagna Nak (ພະຍານາກ, pʰāʔ ɲáː nȃːk)
  - King of the Nagas, protector and deity founder of Chao Si Sattanak.

=== Monkeys ===
Divine parentage makes these monkeys special. The more formal term for this class of humanoid simians is vanone (ວານອນ, váː nɔ́ːn). Because of this the male ones take the noble title Thao (ທ້າວ, tʰȃːo).

- Hanoumane or Hounlamane (ຫະນຸມານ, háʔ nū máːn; ຫຸນລະມານ, hŭn lāʔ máːn)
  - Son of Pha Ram and Nang Phéngsi, aids in the search for Nang Sida and the battle with Hampanasouane.
- Sangkhip (ສັງຄີບ, săŋ kʰȋːp)
  - Switches the role of Valmiki's Vali, son from the rape of Nang Khaysi by Phra Athit, brother of Palichane.
- Palichane (ພະລີຈັນ, pʰāʔ líː tɕan)
  - Switches the role of Valmiki's Sugriva, sone from the rape of Nang Khaysi by Phra Athit, brother of Sangkhip.
- Nang Phéngsi (ນາງແພງສີ, náːŋ pʰɛ́ːŋ sǐː)

== Versions ==
=== Textual ===
Due to the fragile nature of organic matter in hot, humid weather, most of these texts have been mostly lost or destroyed. In 1950, Phra Lak Phra Ram manuscripts were found that proved Laos had preserved four unknown local versions of Ramayana. Several texts have been uncovered at Vat Phra Kèo in Vientiane, Vat Kang Tha in Ban Bo Ô, Ban Naxone Tay, Ban Hom, and Vat Nong Bon, in Laos; Roi Et in Thailand, now housed in Bangkok; and a manuscript of the Vientiane version in Phnom Penh. Of these, only Ban Hom and Ban Naxone Tay have complete versions preserved.

Only two modern printed editions exist. The most noted is Sachchidanda Sahai's version, mostly based on the Vat Phra Kèo version. It was printed in 1973 by the patronage of the Indian Embassy in Vientiane. Vietnamese scholar Vo Thu Tinh also published a 1972 version adapted from the manuscript of Vat Kang Tha, and is depicted at Vat Oup Muong in Vientiane. This version has been criticised for being too simplified.

=== Sister texts ===
In addition to the Phra Lak Phra Ram, other similar stories are known from Laos.

- Phrômmachak

- In a version of the Tai Lu people preserved in Louang Phrabang, Sita is born as Indra's wife Sujata, who is raped by Ravana and reborn as Ravana's daughter On Hi Slap.

- Kuay Toraphi
- Langka Noy

== See also ==
- Literature of Laos
- Ramayana
- Ramakien
- Reamker
- Hikayat Seri Rama
- Thens
