= Gangur River =

Gangur River (Bengali: গাঙুড় নদী) was one of the northern distributaries channels of Damodar River.

== Origin ==
The Gangur River originated near Panagarh, Burdwan District of West Bengal. Gangur River along with Balluku, Bahula, and Banka Rivers are considered the past channels of Damodar River during 17th century.

== Contribution of the river ==
The River Damodar (Sorrow of Bengal) and its paleo-channels like Balluka, Bahula, Gangur, and Banka etc. nourished the land of Bardhaman (Burdwan) with fresh silt deposits. These rivers played a vital role in transportation, communication and livelihood. The rivers valleys had an enriched biodiversity.

== Fate of the river ==
For getting a short term relief from floods, initiatives were taken to construct embankments on both the side of the main channel of Damodar. As a result, left embank detached the river Damodar from the Banka, Balluka, Bahula, Gangur and transformed them into fragmented and degraded wetlands, water bodies, and isolated channels. With the introduction and development of road and railway network River Damodar and its Distributaries Banka and Gangur started to lose its past glory as a means of transport and communication.

In four of these floods (1770, 1855, 1913 and 1943) most of Burdwan town was flooded. At the time of previous floods when there was no embankment on both sides of main Damodar Channel, then Channels of Banka, Gangur, Balluka removed the excess flood water. Construction of the embankments in 1940s prevented the main Damodar River following permanently in the paths of Banka and Gangur River due to flash flood and saved the then Burdwan town.

== Impact of the Gangur River in literature and poetry ==
In Manasamangal Kavya (Bengali: মনসামঙ্গল কাব্য) there is citation of the Gangur River. Jibanananda Das (Bengali: জীবনানন্দ দাশ), a famous Bengali writer, novelist, essayist and one of the premier poet of the post-Tagore era in India and Bangladesh, in his Rupasi Bangla ( Bengali: রূপসী বাংলা ) poetry book also cited about this river in the poem, Banglar Mukh Ami (Bengali: বাংলার মুখ আমি)

                          বাংলার মুখ আমি দেখিয়াছি, তাই আমি পৃথিবীর রূপ
                          খুঁজিতে যাই না আর : অন্ধকারে জেগে উঠে ডুমুরের গাছে
                         ..........................................
                         .......................................... 
                           জাম-বট-কাঁঠালের-হিজলের-অশ্বত্থের ক'রে আছে চুপ;
                           ফণীমনসার ঝোপে শটিবনে তাহাদের ছায়া পড়িয়াছে;
                           মধুকর ডিঙা থেকে না জানি সে কবে চাঁদ চম্পার কাছে
                           এমনই হিজল-বট-তমালের নীল ছায়া বাংলার অপরূপ রূপ
                           দেখেছিলো; বেহুলাও একদিন গাঙুড়ের জলে ভেলা নিয়ে-
                          কৃষ্ণা দ্বাদশীর জ্যোৎস্না যখন মরিয়া ..............
