= Dasaratha Jataka =

Buddhist epic tale

Dasaratha Jataka (Pali: Dasaratha Jātaka) is a Jataka tale about a previous life of the Gautama Buddha. It is the 461st story in the Jataka collection of the Khuddaka Nikaya, part of the Sutta Pitaka in the Pali Canon.

It is based on the ancient Indian epic Ramayana and has been associated with several Southeast Asian adaptations of the Ramayana such as the Thai Ramakien, Lao Phra Lak Phra Ram and Burmese Yama Zatdaw.

Scholars consider the Ramayana to predate the Dasaratha Jataka and regard the Jataka version as a later Buddhist adaptation of the themes found in the Ramayana, noting that the Jataka's narrative serves as a simplified or didactic retelling rather than a direct parallel to the Ramayana.

== Synopsis ==
The Dasaratha Jātaka tells the story of a previous life of Gautama Buddha, in which he is born as Rāma-Paṇḍita, a Bodhisattva. The story emphasizes non-attachment and respect for one's duties.

Rāma is the crown prince of Varanasī and the firstgorn son of King Dasaratha. Fearing that Rāma's stepmother might harm him to secure the throne for her own son, Bharata, the king sends him into 12 years of exile. Rāma is accompanied by his younger brother, Lakkhaṇa, and their sister, Sītā.

Nine years into Rama's exile, King Dasaratha passed away. Bharata refuses to take the throne because he considers Rama its rightful heir. He and his companions set out to find Rama and inform him of their father's death.

When they learn of King Dasaratha's death, Lakkhaṇa and Sītā grieve. However, Rama remains composed and does not cry. When asked, he explains that grieving cannot bring his father back. He reminds them that all things are impermanent, meaning that nothing lasts forever, and encourages them to accept their father's death.

Although Bharata urges him to return, Rāma refuses to end his exile early and insists on fulfilling his father's decree. Instead, Rāma gives Bharata his slippers as a symbol of his authority to rule during his absence. The slippers were placed upon the royal throne while the ministers administered justice. Whnever a case was wrongly decided, the slippers miraculously struck against each other, prompting the ministers to reconsider their judgment; when a verdict was just, they remained silent.

After completing his twelve years of exile, Rāma returns to the kingdom, where the people celebrate his arrival. According to the traditional account, Rāma rules the kingdom for 16,000 years.
