= Hatgobindapur =

- Village
- Location in West Bengal, India Hatgobindapur (India)
- Coordinates: 23.2625°N 87.9784°E
- Country: India
- State: West Bengal
- District: Purba Bardhaman

Population (2011)
  - Total: 5,823

Languages
  - Official: Bengali, English
- Time zone: UTC+5:30 (IST)
- PIN: 713407 (Hatgobindapur)
- Telephone/STD code: 0342
- Lok Sabha constituency: Bardhaman-Durgapur
- Vidhan Sabha constituency: Bardhaman Uttar
- Website: purbabardhaman.gov.in

Hatgobindapur is a village in Burdwan II CD block in Bardhaman Sadar North subdivision of Purba Bardhaman district in the state of West Bengal, India.

== Geography ==
Cities and towns in the Bardhaman Sadar North subdivision of Purba Bardhaman district
M: municipal city/ town, CT: census town, R: rural/ urban centre, H: historical site, W: river project, C: craft centre
Owing to space constraints in the small map, the actual locations in a larger map may vary slightly

=== Location ===
Hatgobindapur is located at 23.2625°N 87.9784°E.

=== Urbanisation ===
73.58% of the population of Bardhaman Sadar North subdivision live in the rural areas. Only 26.42% of the population live in the urban areas, and that is the highest proportion of urban population amongst the four subdivisions in Purba Bardhaman district. The map alongside presents some of the notable locations in the subdivision. All places marked in the map are linked in the larger full screen map.

== Demographics ==
As per the 2011 Census of India Hatgobindapur had a total population of 5,823, of which 2,933 (50%) were males and 2,890 (50%) were females. Population below 6 years was 533. The total number of literates in Hatgobindapur was 3,989 (75.41% of the population over 6 years).

== Transport ==
The Bardhaman-Kalna Road passes through Hatgobindapur.

== Education ==
Dr. Bhupendra Nath Dutta Smriti Mahavidyalaya was established at Hatgobindapur in 1996. It offers honours courses in Bengali, Sanskrit, English, history, political science, philosophy, geography, accountancy, mathematics, chemistry, botany, zoology and nutrition.

== Culture ==
Panchanan's fair is organised at Hatgobindapur in the Bengali month of Ashadha. The village has temples dedicated to Manasa, Sridhara and Durga.

David J. McCutchion mentions the Sridhara temple (18’8” façade) as a standard 17th century atchala temple with porch on triple archway and the Shiva temple (beside the main road) as a standard pancharatna temple with bridged rekha turrets and single entrance. The latter has predominantly vegetal/ floral design.

== Healthcare ==
There is a primary health centre at Kashiara, PO Hatgobindapur (with 4 beds).
