= Hikayat Seri Rama =

Malay adaptation of the Ramayana

Hikayat Seri Rama (Jawi: حكاية سري رام) is the Malay literary adaptation of the Hindu Ramayana epic in the form of a hikayat. The main story remains the same as the original Sanskrit version but some aspects of it were slightly modified to a local context such as the spelling and pronunciation of names. Numerous branch stories had also been developed as accretions to or extensions of this epic with the upgrading of minor characters to major ones, or the invention of totally new characters. For example, Malay writers and storytellers have produced variations in which Laksmana (Lakshman) plays a larger role, sometimes becoming more important than Rama the elder prince much like the Lao Phra Lak Phra Lam. Rama, although righteous and virtuous, was perceived to be weak and his character is often moved to the background while the younger Laksmana is admired for his courage and willingness to react decisively.

== History ==
The Ramayana, a revered text of Hinduism, is a collection of Indian historical stories concentrating on the work of the gods in the lives of men, and was first written down, as legend states, by the sage Valmiki during the third century BC. Ramayana came to Southeast Asia by means of Tamil traders and scholars who traded with ancient kingdoms such as Funan, Angkor and Srivijaya with whom the Indians shared close economic and cultural ties. Folk versions of the Ramayana were told through dance dramas and by penglipurlara (professional storytellers). The wayang kulit (shadow theatre) adaptation, called Hikayat Maharaja Wana, was one of the most important shadow-plays. Puppeteers would pick the most exciting episodes for their shows, particularly the scenes relating to the marriage of Seri Rama, the abduction of Siti Dewi (Sita), the final battles in Langkapuri (Sri Lanka), and the heroine's rescue by her husband.

Its ideals of righteousness, love, loyalty and selfless devotion ensured that the Ramayana remained popular even after Islam's introduction into Asia. The epic was written in its present form some time between the 13th and 17th centuries under the title Hikayat Seri Rama (Chronicle Of The Great Rama) and is generally regarded as a manifestation of the cultural ideals of the ruling elite. It has survived in several recensions but all share the same plot. They are all believed to derive from the oral tradition of eastern and western India with the addition of motifs from the Javanese Panji romance. The name-forms show a distinct Dravidian influence, indicative of the role played by South Indians in disseminating the epic.

Despite the high esteem in which the story of Rama was once held, since the Islamic revival of the 1980s the Hikayat Seri Rama has drastically decreased in popularity. However, students of Malay literary history still consider it an integral part of Malay culture.

=== Hikayat Maharaja Wana ===
The wayang kulit performance differs distinctively from the original hikayat in that not only the elements of the performance are secularised, but the focus of the tale is also shifted instead towards the Maharaja Wana, or Rawana; who is depicted as being more sympathetic than Seri Rama, who is perceived as being arrogant and vain.

== Characters ==
=== Gods ===
In some versions, Allah is the only deity in the story. This was clearly a deviation from the original story which is purely Hinduism in nature.

- Siwa/Batara Guru - Personifies the dissolving and blissful aspect of divinity
- Mahawisnu - Personifies the maintaining aspect of divinity
- Berama Raja/Betara Berma/Adi Berma or Allah - Personifies the creative aspect of divinity
- Parwati - Siwa's consort
- Laksmi - Wisnu's consort
- Betara Indera - Leader of the lesser deities
- Suria - God of the sun; Sugriwa's father
- Raja Bayu - God of wind; Hanoman's father

=== Humans ===
- Seri Rama - Wisnu's awatara (incarnation) and eldest son of Raja Dasarata
- Sita Dewi - Seri Rama's wife; adoptive daughter of Maharisi Kali
- Baradan, Laksmana/Latsamana and Catradan - Rama's half-brothers; the incarnations of Wisnu's possessions
- Maharaja Dasarata - Father of Seri Rama and his brothers and the great-son of Prophet Adam.
- Mandu-Dari/Puteri Mandudari - Rawana's wife. Indrajati's mother.

=== Allies of Seri Rama ===
In some versions such as the Kelantan version, Hanoman was Seri Rama's eldest son who happened to be born as a monkey.

- Hanoman- incarnation of lord Siwa
- Balya Raja - King of Lagur-Katagina (Kiskindha)
- Sugriwa/Sugirwa - Balya's younger brother
- Seri Ankada - Balya's son
- Annila/Raja Tilam - leader of an army of monkeys.
- Bibasenam - Rawana's estranged brother
- Jambuwana - King of the bears

=== Enemies of Seri Rama ===
- Maharaja Rawana - Twenty-armed and ten-faced king of the raksasa (demons) on Langkapuri
- Indrajat/Indrajati - Son of Rawana
- Kumbakarna - Rawana's younger brother
