= Goddess of the River =

2024 novel by Vaishnavi Patel

- Author: Vaishnavi Patel
- Language: English
- Genre: Mythology; Retelling
- Published: 21 May 2024
- Publisher: Orbit Books
- Publication place: United States
- Pages: 416
- ISBN: 9780759557345
- Preceded by: Kaikeyi

Goddess of the River is a 2024 novel by Vaishnavi Patel. It retells some of the events of the Mahabarata from the perspective of the goddess Ganga.

== Plot ==
Many scenes in the story are told out of chronological order. Here, they are summarized in roughly chronological order for clarity.

Part 1: Headwaters

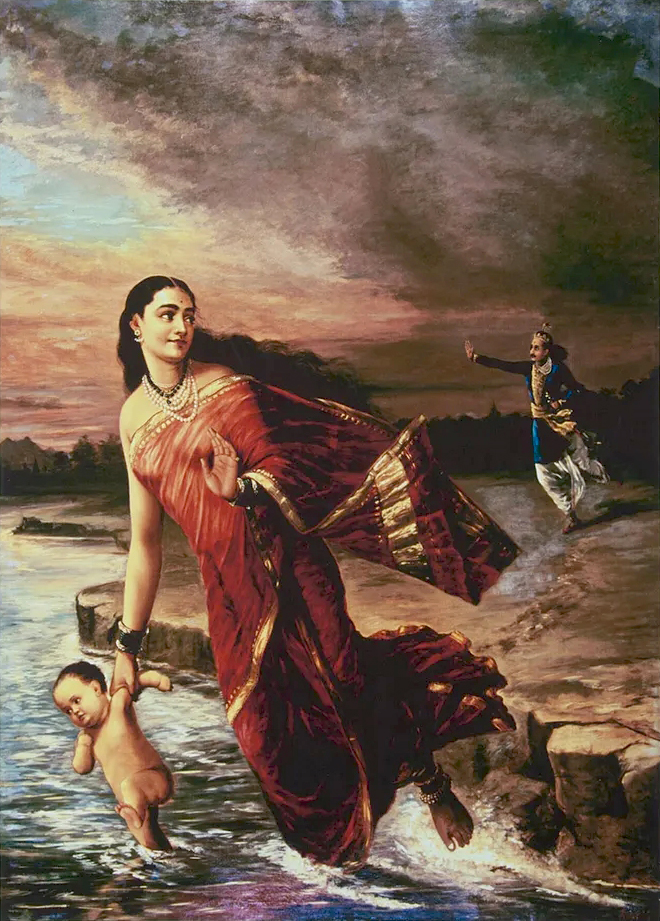
Shantanu attempts to stop Ganga from drowning their eighth child

The goddess Ganga leaves the cosmic ocean and is trapped by Shiva in the form of a river. Shiva maintains control over her course and her abilities; she chafes at his restrictions. Over the years, Ganga befriends the Vasus. Eventually, the city of Hastinapur grows along her banks. She realizes that her friend Vishnu has taken the form of a human, Krishna.

As punishment for their theft of a sacred cow, a sage of Shiva punishes the Vasus with one lifetime spent as humans. When Ganga tries to intervene, she is trapped in a mortal body and is cursed to become the Vasus’ mother. As a human woman, she takes the name Jahnavi. She marries Shantanu, raja of Hastinapur and leader of the Kuru dynasty.

Jahnavi becomes pregnant with one of the Vasus. She gives birth and immediately drowns the newborn, freeing the Vasu from its mortal body. She does this six more times, each time telling her husband that the infant was stillborn. As she prepares to give birth to the eight and final Vasu, Shantanu follows her. Before she can drown the child, he snatches the baby Devavrata from her arms. Her curse broken, Ganga's mortal body disappears and she becomes the river once again.

Part 2: Confluences

Ganga watches as her son Devavrata grows, torn between his love for his mother and his sense of duty as heir to Hastinapur. After Ganga's disappearance, Shantanu marries Satyavati. Devavrata, now called Bhishma, takes a vow of celibacy and renounces his claim to the throne. He vows to always serve the ruler of Hastinapur, and his unwillingness to break these vows leads to consequences that ripple throughout the story.

After Shantanu dies of old age, the throne passes to his son Chitraganda, who quickly dies in battle. The throne then passes to Shantanu's sickly younger son Vichitravirya.

Bhishma summons the sisters Amba, Ambika, and Ambalika to marry Vichitravirya. Amba is already betrothed to another man, but Bhishma disregards her wishes out of loyalty to his kingdom. Amba is permitted to return home without marrying the raja, but is then rejected by her own family for defying her duty. She prays to Ganga for assistance. Disgusted by her son's behavior, Ganga intercedes to Shiva. By Shiva's power, Amba is reincarnated as Shikhandi.

After the death of Vichitravirya, the succession to the throne of Hastinapur is muddled. (Note: Vichitravirya died without biological heirs. His half-brother Vyasa fathered two children in his stead, following the niyogi tradition. Thus, none of the characters fighting for the throne later in the novel are direct descendants of Shantanu.) Dhritarashtra is born blind and is forced to cede the throne to his younger brother Pandu. Years later, Pandu renounces the throne and Dhritarashtra regains power. Duryodhana, son of Dhritarashtra, leads the Kaurava branch of the family. Yudhishthira, son of Pandu, (Note: The Pandavas were acknowledged as the children of Pandu, but they were in fact all fathered by various deities.) leads the Pandavas. Both assert a claim to the throne. Dhritarashtra names his son Duryodhana as heir, but Krishna and Bhishma believe that Yudhishthira would be a more righteous ruler.

Bhishma devises a plan to avoid civil war by dividing the kingdom, leaving the throne of Hastinapur to Duryodhana and a new desert kingdom, Indraprastha, to Yudhishthira. At a ceremony honoring Yudhisthira's new kingdom, conflict breaks out and Krishna strikes down a minor king.

Part 3: Rapids

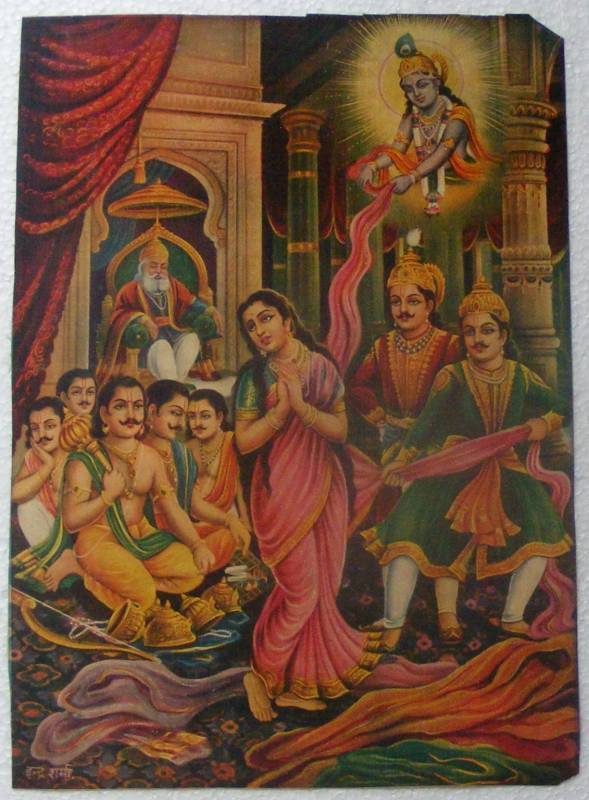
Duryodhana attempts to disrobe Draupadi in front of the Pandavas, while Krishna protects her

Decades before the war, Kunti gives birth to Karna by the sun god Surya. (Note: This makes him the elder half-brother of the Pandavas and also gives him a claim to the throne. Bhishma decides to hide Karna’s true parentage from him to make the looming succession crisis simpler.) She places her son in a basket in the river; Ganga moves him to safety, where he is found and adopted by a new family. Kunti later marries Pandu and gives birth to Yudhisthira. As a young man, Karna defeats one of the Pandavas in an archery contest. Despite his supposed low-caste status, Duryodhana treats him as an equal, while the Pandavas look down on him.

Yudhisthira loses his money, his land, his own freedom, and his wife Draupadi in a rigged game of dice with the Kauravas. Duryodhana attempts to strip Draupadi naked; Bhishma stands by silently, unwilling to break his oath to the throne. Krishna intervenes to protect her virtue. In recognition, Raja Dhritarasthra frees the Pandavas and returns their lost possessions.

Later, Yudhisthira once again loses at gambling, resulting in the exile of the Pandavas and the occupation of their kingdom by the Kauravas. At the end of the exile, Duryodhana refuses to return their property despite Bhishma's counsel. Krishna calls out Duryodhana's violation of dharma and asks Bhishma to side with the Pandavas; Bhishma again refuses to break his oaths. Krishna reveals the truth of Karna's parentage to him, but Karna refuses to turn his back on his friend Duryodhana. On the advice of Krishna, Ganga takes on a mortal body once more, hoping to stop the pending war.

Part 4: Delta

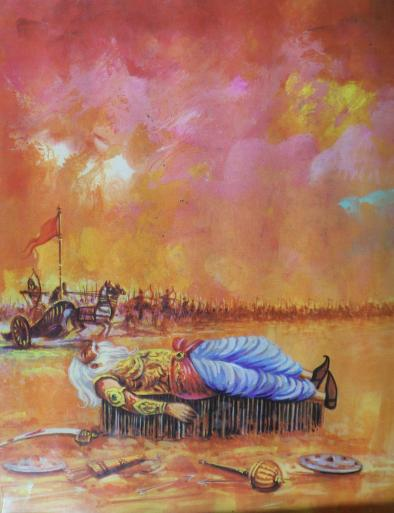
Death of Bhishma during the Kurukshetra War

Open war finally breaks out between the Pandavas and Kauravas. Bhishma attempts to set honorable rules of combat for the battle, but the battlefield quickly devolves into chaos and senseless violence. Kunti finally reveals Karna's parentage to him and asks him not to fight his half-brothers; he refuses.

Bhishma kills hundreds of soldiers on the battlefield. He has a crisis of faith, realizing that his oath to the throne has led him to commit many unrighteous acts. In her human form, Ganga comforts him. She asks him to swear that he will never raise a weapon against Shikhandi, who fights for the Pandavas. Bhishma reveals this weakness to the Pandavas, hoping to end the war at the cost of his own life. The next day, Shikandhi confronts Bhishma and severely wounds him.

Meanwhile, Shiva frees Ganga from his influence and grants her true freedom. The two deities watch as the battle ends; the Pandavas kill Duryodhana. Karna has been killed by one of his half-brothers, and Kunti finally reveals the truth to her surviving sons. Ganga offers comfort to the grieving survivors of the war.

Yudhishthira, the new Raja, says his farewells to a dying Bhishma. Ganga stays with Bhishma as he dies and is reborn.

== Major themes ==
According to Catherine Berridge of the British Fantasy Society, Goddess of the River explores the nature of goodness and ethics. According to Berridge:

An Ancient Indian might have been tempted to say that the keeping of oaths and obedience to duty are defining features of an ethical life – but this is something that is challenged here in Goddess of the River and the Mahabharata. It is Bhishma’s rigid adherence to oath and duty that leads to the disaster of the world-destroying war. However, it is never made entirely clear what the answer to the ethical question is if it is not duty.

A review in Outlook also commented on the themes of morality present in the novel. According to this review, Bhisma chooses "an inflexible honour over dharma which eventually results in his failure to defend women like Amba and Draupadi, leading to his death through adharma."

A reviewer from The Tribune noted that "the constant in Ganga’s life, as we see it, is being bound." According to this reviewer, both Ganga's binding by Shiva and her bonds of love to her son Bhishma reflect the way in which human women might feel bound. The review concludes that Ganga's gender is integral to the story, for the "prism of her desires and dilemmas" would have produced "different patterns" had Ganga been male.

== Background ==
Anjana Basu of Outlook notes that Patel changed the beginning of her tale. In the original Mahabharata, Ganga is brought to earth by the prayers of the human Bhagirath, whereas Patel's version of the character is captured and controlled by Shiva.

Goddess of the River is a retelling of the Mahabharata. While many characters behave differently from their original appearance in the epic poem, their familial relationships are essentially unchanged. Below, a family tree shows many of the characters of the Kuru family in the original Mahabharata.

This shows the line of royal and family succession, not necessarily the parentage. See the notes below for detail.

Kuru family tree

Kuru^{[a]}
Anasawan^{[a]}
Bheemasena(1)^{[a]}
Pratisravas^{[a]}
Pratipa^{[a]}
Gangā	Shāntanu^{[a]}	Satyavati	Pārāshara
Bhishma	Chitrāngada	Ambikā	Vichitravirya	Ambālikā	Vyāsa
Dhritarāshtra^{b}	Gāndhāri	Shakuni	Surya (Deva)	Kunti	Pāndu^{b}	Mādri
Karna^{c}	Yudhishthira^{d}	Bhima^{d}	Arjuna^{d}	Subhadrā	Nakula^{d}	Sahadeva^{d}
Duryodhana^{e}	Dussalā	Dushāsana	(98 sons)
Abhimanyu^{f}	Uttarā
Parikshit	Madravti
Janamejaya

Key to Symbols

- Male: blue border
- Female: red border
- Pandavas: green box
- Kauravas: yellow box

Notes

- a: Shantanu was a king of the Kuru dynasty or kingdom, and was some generations removed from any ancestor called Kuru. His marriage to Ganga preceded his marriage to Satyavati.
- b: Pandu and Dhritarashtra were fathered by Vyasa in the niyoga tradition after Vichitravirya's death. Dhritarashtra, Pandu and Vidura were the sons of Vyasa with Ambika, Ambalika and a maid servant respectively.
- c: Karna was born to Kunti through her invocation of Surya, before her marriage to Pandu.
- d: Yudhishthira, Bhima, Arjuna, Nakula and Sahadeva were acknowledged sons of Pandu but were begotten by the invocation by Kunti and Madri of various deities. They all married Draupadi (not shown in tree).
- e: Duryodhana and his siblings were born at the same time, and they were of the same generation as their Pandava cousins.
- f : Although the succession after the Pandavas was through the descendants of Arjuna and Subhadra, it was Yudhishthira and Draupadi who occupied the throne of Hastinapura after the great battle.

The birth order of siblings is correctly shown in the family tree (from left to right), except for Vyasa and Bhishma whose birth order is not described, and Vichitravirya and Chitrangada who were born after them. The fact that Ambika and Ambalika are sisters is not shown in the family tree. The birth of Duryodhana took place after the birth of Karna and Yudhishthira, but before the birth of the remaining Pandava brothers.

Some siblings of the characters shown here have been left out for clarity; this includes Vidura, half-brother to Dhritarashtra and Pandu.

== Reception ==
Catherine Berridge of the British Fantasy Society called the novel "an excellent retelling", noting that it is "refreshing to read a story that draws on material that comes from outside the traditional Western canon." Leah von Essen of Booklist wrote that Patel has "once again narrowed her version of a famous epic into one compelling, female protagonist." Von Essen recommended the novel for both fans of the original and for fans of mythological fantasy.

Katyayani Sanjay Bhatia of The Tribune praised the characterization of Ganga and the themes of the novel. Bhatia noted that the novel only "scrapes the surface" of Ganga's dilemmas and wished for more exploration, but also stated that the author "gives the reader enough space to ruminate..." Anjana Basu of Outlook praised the way in which Patel dealt with Bhishma's concept of honor and dharma. Basu noted that "a familiarity with the Mahabharata’s many stories is a must for the reader," finding that readers unfamiliar with the source material might be confused by the intricate plot and numerous characters. Basu stated that "In the Indian context, the story is comprehensible since everyone knows exactly what will happen and only wants to know how Patel will deal with each episode."
