= Koulutla Chennakesava Temple =

- Location in Andhra Pradesh

Religion
- Affiliation: Hinduism
- District: Kurnool
- Deity: Sri Koulutla Chennakesava Swamy
- Festival: Annual Brahmostavams on week of Magha Pournami

Location
- Location: Kappatralla, Kurnool, Andhra Pradesh
- State: Andhra Pradesh
- Country: India
- Interactive map of Koulutla Chennakesava Temple
- Coordinates: 15°51′23″N 77°22′37″E

Architecture
- Type: South Indian

Koulutla Chennakesava Temple is located in a reserved forest of Kappatralla, Devanakonda mandal 50 km from Kurnool District headquarters. The great Vijayanagara King, Sri Krishna Deva Raya, constructed a temple complex for the deity. Along with Koulutla Chennakesava Temple there are additional Shiva temples in this shrine.

- Mallikarjuna Swamy, Bramarambika and Vijaya Vinayaka Temple
- Lord Dakshinamurthy Temple
- Lord Viswanatha Temple

== History ==
King Parikshith (the grandson, of Arjuna) ruled over Hastinapura after Pandavas retired to Kailasa. One day, Parikshith was thirsty while on a hunting trip to the forest. He found a saint in deep meditation. He asked for water and the Rishi (saint) did not reply. Parikshith got frustrated and played a prank by putting a dead snake around the neck of the Rishi. He was cursed by the Rishi that he would die of a snake bite within a week; he died consequently at the hands of the Naga prince Takshaka.

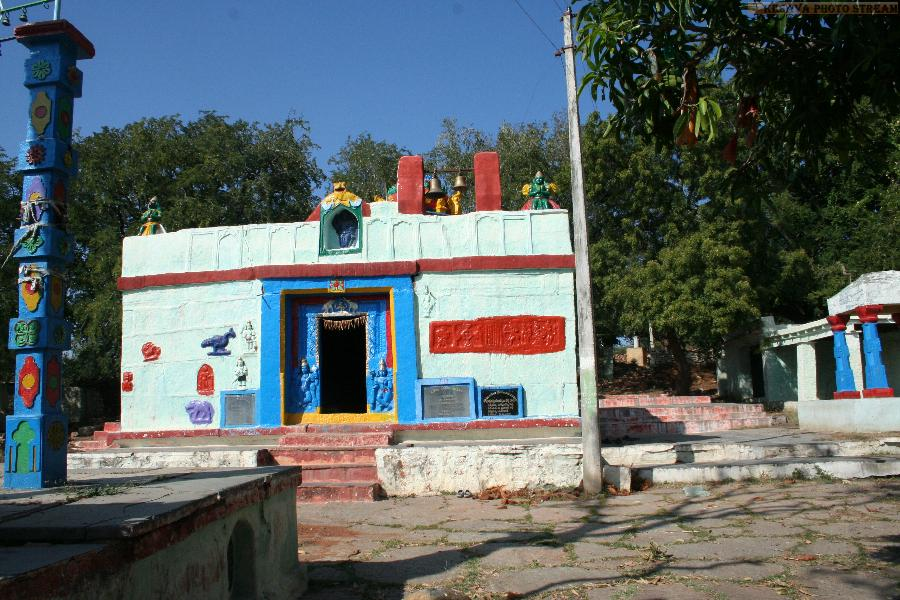
Koulutla Chenna Kesava Temple front view

When Janamejaya (the son of Parikshith) became the King, he wanted to avenge the death of his father and performed Sarpa Yaga (serpent penance). Things then took a fateful turn. Astika, who was born of a man and a Naga woman, came to the snake sacrifice and, seeing what was happening, explained to Janamejaya that Takshaka was safe under Indra's protection. Janamejaya was extremely pleased to have gotten this valuable information and granted Astika a wish. Astika asked to stop the snake sacrifice, instead of asking for gold or silver.

Then Saint Vasista asked Janamejaya to perform consecration (Prathista) of Vishnava temples to redeem the sins of killing innocent snakes during Sarpa Yaga. Consequently, a Chennakesava idol was consecrated in Koundinya Asrama to perform regular pujas. After many years, the idol was covered by an anthill (putta). In the 11th century A.D., Golla Koulutla observed that his cow was letting her milk flow to the anthill (putta). That night, Lord Chennakesava (Vishnu) appeared in his dream and told him to remove the anthill and re-consecrate his idol. Koulutla dutifully followed the instructions and from then on the deity was known as Koulutla Chennakesava Swamy.

The temple has been used as a gathering location for local villagers to protest uranium mining plans in the reserve forest region.

== Photo gallery ==
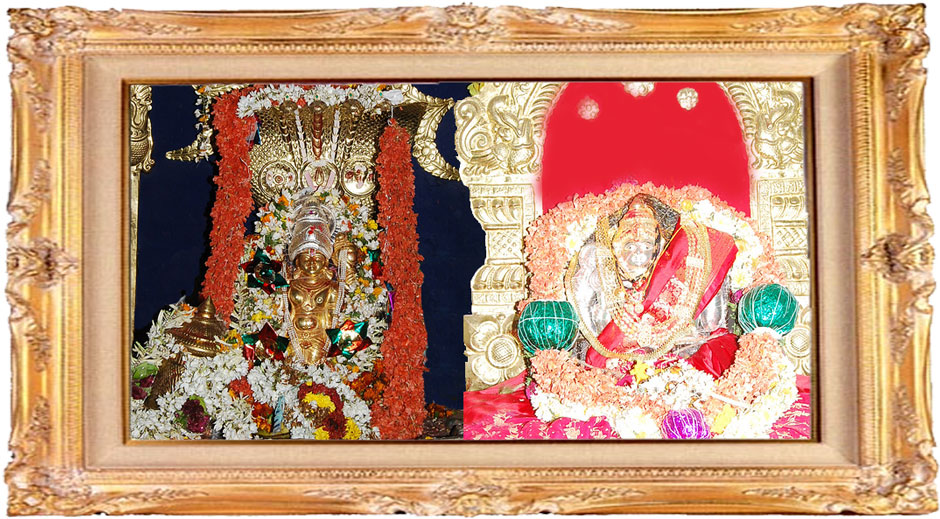
Chenaa Kesava

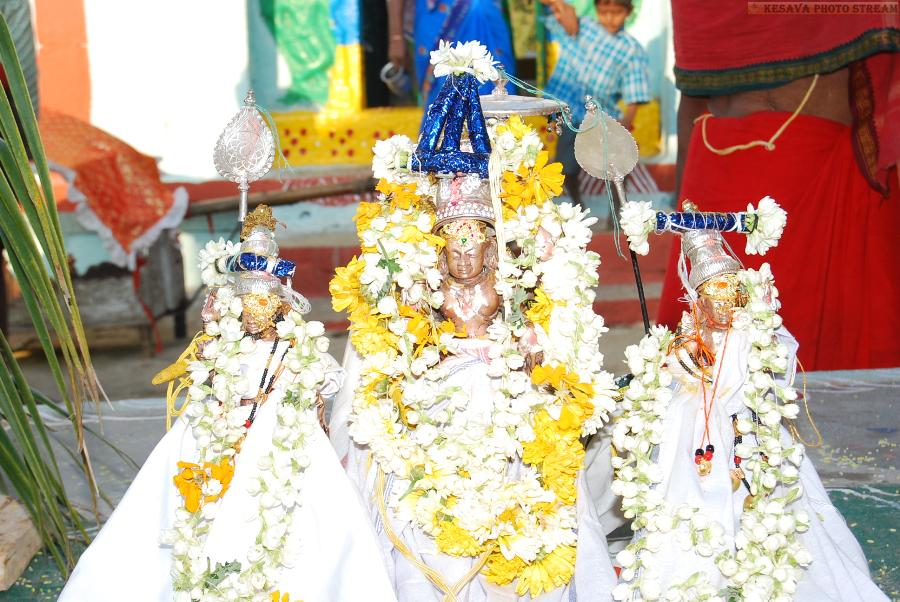
Vutsava Idols

== See also ==
- Kurnool District
- Vijayanagara King
- Krishna Deva Raya
