= Aswamedham =

Aswamedham may refer to:

- Ashvamedha, a horse sacrifice ritual in Hinduism
- Ashvamedhika Parva, fourteenth book of the ancient Indian epic Mahabharata
- Ashwamedhadatha, a king of the Kuru Kingdom in Vedic India
- Ashwamedh, a Gujarati-language play by Indian writer Chinu Modi
- Aswamedham (TV series), an Indian quiz television program
- Aswamedham (film), a 1992 Indian Telugu-language action film
- Ashwamedham, a 1967 Indian Malayalam-language film
- Ashwamedh Devi, an Indian politician
- Eutropis ashwamedhi, a lizard species
