= Vaishnavi Patel =

American author

- Born: 1995/1996 (age 30–31); Chicago, Illinois, United States
- Education: Yale Law School
- Occupations: Novelist and lawyer
- Years active: 2022–present
- Notable work: Kaikeyi; Goddess of the River
- Website: vaishnavipatel.com

Vaishnavi Patel (born 1995 or 1996) is an American novelist and lawyer. She is best known for her fantasy novel Kaikeyi (2022).

== Writing career ==
In 2022, Patel's debut novel Kaikeyi, an adult fantasy re-imagining of the life of Kaikeyi from the Hindu epic Ramayana, was published by Redhook. Kaikeyi was met with positive reviews, including praise for its depictions of justice and its faithfulness to the source text. It was nominated for both the 2022 Goodreads Choice Awards for Fantasy and Debut Novel, and the 2023 Ignyte Award for Best Adult Novel. It reached number 14 on The New York Times Best Seller list for hardcover fiction.

Patel's second novel for adults, Goddess of the River, was released by Orbit Books in 2024. The novel, described as a feminist retelling of the story of the goddess Ganga, was nominated for the 2025 Audie Award for Fantasy. In 2025, Patel released her third novel, Ten Incarnations of Rebellion, through Ballantine Books. The book, set in an alternate version of 1960s India still colonised by the United Kingdom, was described as "an epic and frighteningly plausible work of historical fiction" by Kirkus Reviews. It won the 2025 Sidewise Award for Alternate History.

Patel's fourth novel, We Dance Upon Demons, described as a "fantasy spin" on the reproductive rights movement, was released by Saga Press in May 2026.

== Legal career ==
Patel is also a lawyer, having graduated from Yale Law School and taken the bar exam in 2022. In 2023, she worked as a law clerk in the District Court for the Southern District of Texas in Houston. She works as a lawyer focusing on constitutional law and civil rights.

== Personal life ==
Patel grew up in Chicago, Illinois. She got married in 2022.

== Bibliography ==
- Kaikeyi (2022)
- Goddess of the River (2024)
- Ten Incarnations of Rebellion (2025)
- We Dance Upon Demons (2026)
