= Kaikeyi (novel) =

2022 novel by Vaishnavi Patel

- Author: Vaishnavi Patel
- Language: English
- Published: 26 Apr 2022
- Publisher: Orbit Books
- Publication place: United States
- Pages: 432
- ISBN: 978-0-759-55733-8
- Followed by: Goddess of the River

Kaikeyi is a 2022 novel, the debut novel by Vaishnavi Patel. The work is a re-imagining of the life of the titular character, who first appeared in the ancient Sanskrit epic, the Ramayana. The character of Kaikeyi has long been vilified for her role in banishing her stepson Rama from the kingdom of Kosala. Patel's novel tells the story from Kaikeyi's perspective.

== Plot ==
Princess Kaikeyi is the only daughter of King Ashwapati of Kekaya. Kaikeyi grows up with no connection to the gods; unlike the rest of her family, they never answer any of her prayers. Kaikeyi discovers an old manuscript and learns to visualize the Binding Plane. Using this power, she can see threads connecting her to her other people. By plucking on these threads, she finds that she can manipulate their behavior.

When she is sixteen, Kaikeyi is ordered to marry Raja Dasharath of Kosala, who has two other wives but remains childless. She agrees to marry Dasharath only on the condition that if she bears him a son, he will become the heir to Kosala.

Kaikeyi serves as Dasharath's charioteer in battle; she kills a minor warlord, saving his life. As a reward, he grants her two boons and a seat on his council. Kaikeyi slowly befriends Kaushalya and Sumitra, Dasharath's first two wives. The raja and his wives perform a Yagna. Agni appears before Kaikeyi, calling her both “gods-touched” and “forsaken”. All three women become pregnant at the same time. Kaushalya gives birth to Rama; the next day, Kaikeyi gives birth to Bharata; the next week, Sumitra gives birth to twins Lakshmana and Shatrugna.

Kaikeyi, Kaushalya, and Sumitra start a Women's Council to advocate for the needs of women within the country. This is opposed by religious leaders but is otherwise popular. When Rama is ten years old, he makes a derogatory remark about women. Kaikeyi slaps him and is frightened to see an image of god-like power within him.

Kaikeyi is sent as an emissary to Kekaya, where she reunites with her twin Yudhajjt. She brings Bharata and Rama with her. Along the way, Rama speaks to the river goddess Sarasvati, and Kaikeyi recognizes him as the incarnation of a god.

As her political influence grows, Kaikeyi angers Kosala's religious leaders by promoting women's independence from their husbands. She grows increasingly concerned by Rama's attraction to these conservative ideas. Dasharath breaks his promise to make Bharata his heir and names Rama instead. He then sends Rama and Lakshmana to train at an ashram; there, Rama is further exposed to sexist beliefs.

Dasharath tells Kaikeyi that he will abdicate in favor of Rama. She realizes that Rama's divine powers are allowing him to unconsciously manipulate others in the Binding Plane. Kaikeyi's twin brother Yudhajit now rules Kekaya. He states that Kaikeyi should not have released Dasharath from his promise to make Bharata his heir. Yudhajit threatens war if his biological nephew (Bharata) fails to assume the throne.

Kaikeyi tries to convince Rama to step aside in favor of Bharata, but he refuses. As the pressure of the impending coronation grows, Rama snaps and threatens his wife Sita. Kaikeyi decides that he must become more mature before assuming the throne. She uses the boons that Dasharath once granted her to demand Rama's exile and to place Bharata on the throne as his regent.

Rama leaves the city, accompanied by Lakshmana. Dasharath dies of grief. Bharata rejects the throne and curses Kaikeyi. Yudhajit prepares to go to war against Kosala. Shatrugna kills Yudhajit against Bharata's wishes. Bharata forgives Kaikeyi and agrees to rule during Rama's exile. Kaikeyi ponders how her story will be told in the future and hopes that Rama's time in exile will allow him to grow into the ruler he is meant to become.

== Major themes ==
A 2023 article in The Guardian examines the trend of feminist retellings of classic myths, writing that many such stories focus on western myths. The article specifically mentions novels like Kaikeyi and Daughter of the Moon Goddess which come from a non-western background. The article quotes author Sue Lynn Tan who stated that for myths "that are less well-known, beyond the country of origin, retellings can introduce the culture to more readers".

Preeti Hay also commented on Kaikeyi's place in the genre of retellings, specifically drawing reference to Madeline Miller’s Circe, Anita Diamant’s The Red Tent, and Chitra Banerjee Divakaruni’s The Palace of Illusions. Hay writes that stories within this genre "use the framework of fiction to reimagine an established narrative, often through the point of view of a minor or lesser-known character who may or may not be a woman, or a woman character who is the main counterpart to the hero of the story."

== Background ==
In an interview with Literary Hub, Patel explained that she had to be careful regarding religious sensitivities while writing the story. Patel stated "I don’t feel like any element of the actual story has been changed because of the knowledge that it’s a very powerful cultural story... But it has changed ... the marketing and the conversations that have come out of it."

== Reception ==
Publishers Weekly gave the novel a starred review, calling it a "mesmerizing debut". The review states that "readers familiar with the source text will be wowed by Patel’s reimagining, while those new to the story will be won over by its powerful, multilayered heroine and epic scope." A review in Kirkus Reviews writes that the author "recasts the Ramayana as a power struggle between women who want to participate in politics and public service and men who would rather they stay home." The review concludes that "With spellbinding twists and turns, this is a political novel and very much a feminist one." Elizabeth Hand of the Washington Post describes the original Kaikeyi as a member of "the pantheon of wicked stepmothers — an unsavory roster from which she’s rescued" by Patel's novel. Hand praises the novel as a feminist tale, a "careful depiction of one woman’s struggle to bring justice to an unjust world".

Preeti Hay of India Currents praised the novel's complex characterizations, writing that "the relationship between Rama and Lakshmana, and between Sita and Rama is not idyllic as we are used to believing. Like any good fictional story, Patel’s novel is full of conflict and flaw." Hay concludes that the novel is "a fierce and compelling story of a woman whose voice has finally been dared to be imagined." Saloni Sharma of Scroll.in praised the narrative, writing that the novel is "a defiant act of reclamation, [which] rescues the eponymous queen from eternal erasure and allows her to tell her own story." She notes that the novel might offend religious sensitivities, stating that "Kaikeyi is likely to be a contentious book. It is certainly not going to go down well with anyone who sees the Ramayana as a religious text and its hero as sacrosanct." Sharma writes about the history of the Ramayana and its numerous different versions, referencing the text Three Hundred Ramayanas by A. K. Ramanujan. For Sharma, "Kaikeyi then, is not so much a radical departure as the continuation of a dialogue."

Lacy Baugher Milas of Paste also praised the novel's characterization, especially the "rich" relationship between Kaikeyi and Rama, as well as their personality clashes. She also praises Kaikeyi as a tragic figure. Milas writes that Kaikeyi's use of the Binding Plane to control others may be "uncomfortable and problematic", but "even Kaikeyi’s worst actions, in this retelling, can almost always be traced back to her desire for agency..." In a more negative review, Mahvesh Murad of Reactor criticized Kaikeyi's use of the Binding Plane to manipulate others. The review states that "In trying to absolve a character vilified in canon, Patel has given us a confused narrative, in which Kaikeyi the character remains destructive, but all her actions are constantly justified as having noble intent."
