= Ashvapati =

Sanskrit term for horse-lord

Ashvapati or Aśvapati (Sanskrit: अश्वपति, romanized: Aśvapati) is the appellation of many kings in Hindu mythology. It means 'Lord of horses.' It was an appellation comparable to that of the knight or Ritter in Europe. According to Ramayana, Ashvapati was king of Kekeya Kingdom the land of fine horses. He was father of one daughter, Kaikeyi (a queen of King Dasharatha), and seven sons. His son Yudhajeet played an important role in Ramayana. Ashvapati performed a journey in search of an answer to the imperative need of human race.

== Exile Of His Wife ==
Due to a boon, Ashvapati was able to understand the language of the birds. However, this was accompanied by a caveat that if he ever revealed the content of bird speak to anyone, even his own mother, that he would forthwith lose his life. One day, the King and his Queen were strolling through the palace gardens when Ashvapati happened to overhear the conversation of a pair of mated swans. The conversation so amused him that he laughed heartily, instigating his wife's curiosity. Despite being aware of the fact that Ashvapati could not divulge the content of the conversation to her without losing his life, Kaikeyi's mother insisted on knowing the cause of the King's mirth. When Ashvapati realised that his wife cared little for his life or well-being, he had her banished to her parents' home.
