= Kaikeyi =

Queen of Kosala in Ramayana

- Queen of Kosala
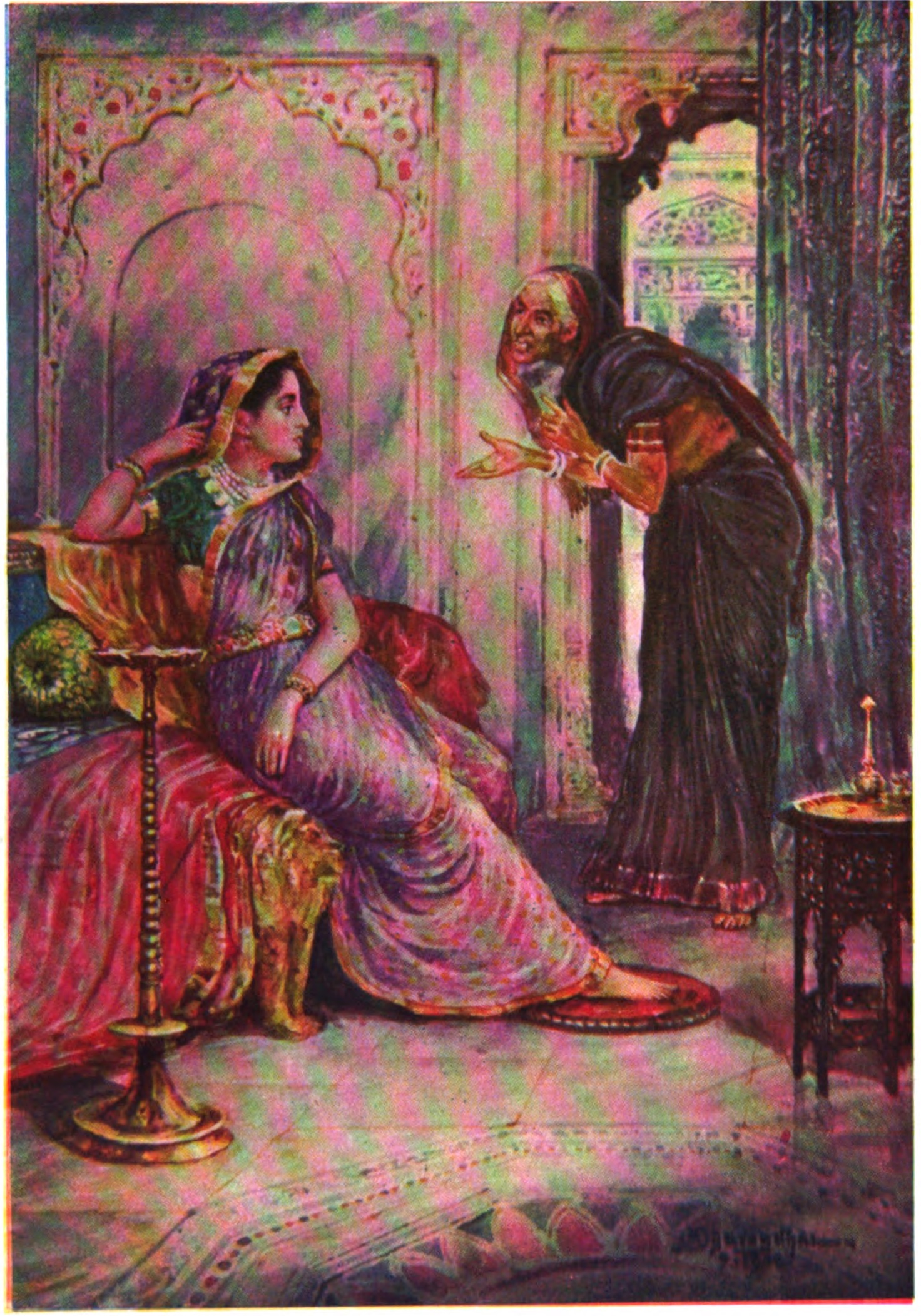
- Manthara manipulates Queen Kaikeyi into exiling Prince Rama
- Spouse: Dasharatha
- Issue: Bharata (Son)
- House: Ayodhya
- Dynasty: Kekeya (by birth); Raghuvamsha-Suryavamsha (by marriage)
- Father: Ashvapati
- Religion: Hinduism

Kaikeyi,(Sanskrit: कैकेयी, IAST: Kaikeyī) is a princess of Kekeya and the queen of Kosala in the Hindu epic Ramayana. Kaikeyi is the third and favourite consort of King Dasharatha, who ruled Kosala from its capital, Ayodhya. She is the mother of Bharata.

Out of Dasharatha's three wives, Kaikeyi exerts the most influence. Formerly the princess of Kekeya, she is described to have served as an able counsellor to her husband during times of war. Initially loving and motherly towards her stepson, Prince Rama, Kaikeyi's mind is influenced by Manthara, her maid. Under her influence, Rama is exiled to the forest for a period of fourteen years.

== Legend ==
=== Birth and early life ===
Kaikeyi was born to King Ashvapati of Kekeya shortly before her mother was exiled. She was raised with her only mother figure being her hunchbacked nursemaid, Manthara. She is raised with seven brothers, including her twin, Yudhājit.

=== Marriage and child ===
Kaikeyi is married to the king of Kosala, Dasharatha. Dasharatha performs the Putrakameshti yagna along with his three wives in hopes having children. At the sacrifice conducted by Rishyasringa to obtain sons for the childless Dasharatha, a divine being emerges from the flames with a golden vessel filled with divine payasam (a milk delicacy) prepared by the gods. Dasharatha offers half of this divine food to Kausalya, a quarter to Sumitra (i.e., literally 'half of that which remained'), an eighth to Kaikeyi (i.e., again, 'half of that which remained'), and then, upon reflection, gives the final eighth to Sumitra again. Consequently, Kausalya gives birth to Rama, Sumitra to the twins Lakshmana and Shatrughna, and Kaikeyi to Bharata.

=== Boons by Dasharatha ===
In a battle between the devas and the asuras, Dasharatha rode to Devaloka, accompanied by Kaikeyi, to help Indra fight against the asuras. The devas were at a disadvantage due to the sorcery employed by Shambara and his army of asuras. Dasharatha, riding a chariot, faced the asuras in ten directions at the same time. In this battle, his chariot had to be turned to every direction in a swift manner. During the battle, the bolt of one of the wheels slipped out, and the wheel was about to disengage when Kaikeyi inserted her thumb in the hole of the bolt, and kept the chariot steady. When the king learnt of this, he was pleased, and offered her two boons. The queen said that she would ask for those two boons in the future, as she wished for nothing right then and there.

=== Manthara's influence and Rama's exile ===
Under the custom of primogeniture, Dasharatha, with the approval of the royal assembly, selected Rama to be his heir. Kaikeyi was delighted and as happy as she would have been had it been her own son during the coronation. However, Manthara, Kaikeyi's nurse, feared that Kaikeyi would lose her status as chief queen at court if Rama ascended the throne, as Kausalya would thus become queen mother. She decided to instigate trouble. She tried to fuel Kaikeyi's jealousy and envy of Kausalya by reminding her that her son's coronation would give Kausalya her former status as the most important of Dasharatha's queens and would cut Bharata out of the line of succession forever, but this had no effect on Kaikeyi at the time.

Manthara later convinced Kaikeyi to demand two boons granted to her years earlier by Dasharatha. King Dasharatha was obliged to fulfill them. Kaikeyi demanded that Bharata be crowned king, and that Rama be sent to the forest for a period of fourteen years. Hearing this, Dasharatha fell into a swoon and passed the night in a pitiable condition in Kaikeyi's palace.

=== Widowhood and later life ===
Grief-stricken, Dasharatha died six days after he exiled Rama from Ayodhya. Kaikeyi blamed herself for this death. Furthermore, Bharata swore never to ascend the throne as it was his older brother's birthright. He further blamed her for his father's death and swore never to address her as "mother" again. Realising her mistake, Kaikeyi repented sending her beloved step son away for fourteen years.

After Rama's return, she apologised to him for her sins. Rama touched her feet and said there was no need to ask for forgiveness, as he did not feel bad about what happened. He insisted that Bharata forgive his mother. Further defending Kaikeyi, Rama told Bharata that mothers act for the betterment of their children, not for themselves. He therefore asked Bharata to not be angry with his mother, Kaikeyi regardless of whether her actions were good or bad.

== Assessment ==
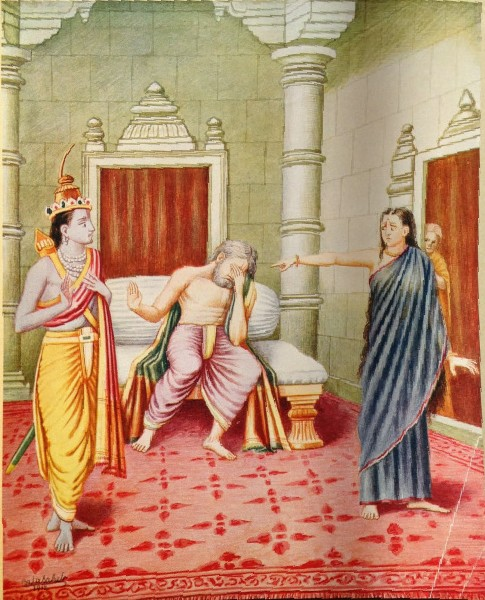
Kaikeyi invokes the two boons granted to her by Dasharatha

Kaikeyi's personality and her relationships are quite revealing in Ayodhya Kanda of the Valmiki Ramayana. Kaikeyi maintained strong relations with her maternal family even after her wedding to King Dasharatha. Her brother Yudhajit visits her many times and takes a keen interest in the life of her son Bharata, often taking the latter and Shatrughna away to the Kaikeya kingdom during the summer.

Kaikeyi helped her husband Dasharatha in the Dandaka forest while he was at war. While Kaikeyi saved the king in the war, as per mythology, her left hand was strong as a diamond (a boon from a Saint) so the she accompanied the king during wars.

Kaikeyi was the king's favorite queen. Kaikeyi's nature is described as being temperamental and unpredictable. While she was mostly gentle, it is evident that she disliked the king spending time with his other queens. King Dasharatha mentions that he did not treat his queen Kausalya with the love she deserved due to fear of Kaikeyi's tantrums and possessiveness.

Kaikeyi seemed almost naive when it came to understanding the rights of the four princes to Ayodhya's throne. She naively mentions to her maid Manthara that Bharata can rule Ayodhya after Rama, not understanding the law of primogeniture. It is Manthara who educates Kaikeyi of the manner of succession.

Kaikeyi's naive nature and gentleness were transformed into obstinacy and a hunger for power all in the name of her son Bharata's welfare. Bharata contests her views and despises her for her act of banishing the rightful heir Rama to the forest for punishing him for no fault of his own. King Dasharatha tries to reason with her, arguing in terms of the stability of the kingdom, the people's will, and the court's decision to crown Rama, none of which seems reasonable to her. Finally, King Dasharatha renounces her, and yet he is unable to separate himself from her. He lingers on in his grief in her chambers in fear of the humiliation from everyone outside those chambers.

== In popular culture ==
=== Films ===
- Vasundhara portrayed Kaikeyi in the 1997 Telugu film Ramayanam.
- Shanoor Sana portrayed Kaikeyi in the 2011 Telugu film Sri Rama Rajyam.
- Sonali Khare portrayed her in the 2023 bilingual film Adipurush.
- Priya Nimishakavi portrayed her in the 2024 Hindi film Singham Again.
- Lara Dutta portrayed her in the 2026 Hindi film Ramayana: Part 1.

=== Television ===
- Padma Khanna portrayed Kaikeyi in the 1987 series Ramayan and the 1988 series Luv Kush.
- Dolly Minhas portrayed Kaikeyi in 2000 series Vishnu Puran and 2002 series Ramayan.
- Hemaakshi Ujjain portrayed Kaikeyi in the 2008 series Ramayan.
- Manasvi Vyas portrayed Kaikeyi in the 2011 series Devon Ke Dev...Mahadev.
- Shikha Swaroop portrayed Kaikeyi in the 2012 series Ramayan.
- Alefia Kapadia / Reshmi Ghosh portrayed Kaikeyi in the 2015 series Sankat Mochan Mahabali Hanumaan.
- Grusha Kapoor portrayed Kaikeyi in the 2015 series Siya Ke Ram.
- Piyali Munshi portrayed Kaikeyi in the 2018 series Ram Siya Ke Luv Kush.
- Tisca Chopra portrayed Kaikeyi in the 2021 web series Ramyug.
- Shilpa Saklani portrayed Kaikeyi in the 2024 series Shrimad Ramayan.
- Sonia Singh portrayed Kaikeyi in 2024 DD National series Kakabhushundi Ramayan- Anasuni Kathayein.

==== YouTube ====
- Devika Thirani portrayed Kaikeyi in 2024 YouTube series Valmiki Ramayan.

=== Books ===
- Kaikeyi is the eponymous narrator of Kaikeyi by Vaishnavi Patel, a 2022 feminist retelling of the narrator's story.

== See also ==
- Dasharatha
- Kausalya
- Sumitra
