= Ashwamedhadatha =

Kuru king in the Middle Vedic period

- Raja

King of Kuru
- Reign: unknown
- Predecessor: Janamejaya
- Successor: Adhisimakrishna
- Issue: Adhisimakrishna
- Dynasty: Kuru
- Father: shantanik
- Religion: Hinduism

Ashwamedhadatha was a King of Kuru kingdom who reigned during the Middle Vedic period. He is also grandson of King Janamejaya (through his son Shatanika). He succeeded his grandfather. His grandson King Nicakṣu is the founder of Vatsa branch of Kuru Clan.
