= Madravati =

Character in ancient Hindu text

Madravati (मद्रावती) is a minor character in the Mahabharata, described as the wife of Kuru King Parikshit, the mother of King Janamejaya (who was the grandson of Abhimanyu) and the great-grandson of Arjuna the Pandava prince on the other side.

Madravati is also referred as Iravati in the Bhagavata Purana.
