= Parikshit =

King of Kuru

- Kauravya Raja Vishvajanina
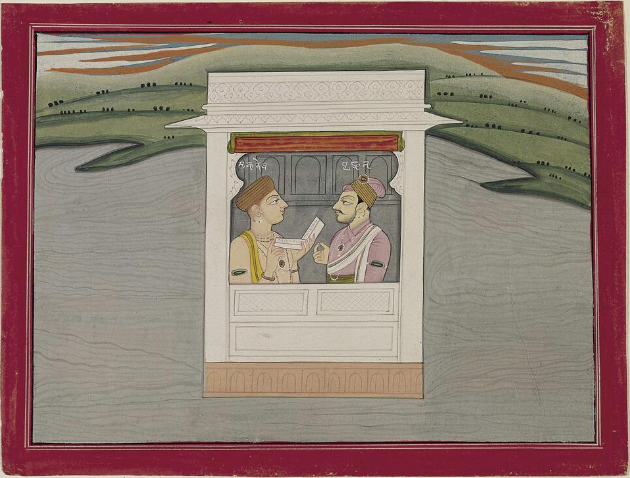
- 18th century illustration of Sage Shuka and King Parikshit

King of Kuru
- Reign: c. 1376 – c. 1316 BCE (Puranic chronology) c. 1358 – c. 1298 BCE (Buddhist chronology)
- Predecessor: Yudhishthira (Note: (Grand Uncle) according to Mahabharata)
- Successor: Janamejaya
- Born: c. 1412 BCE (Puranic chronology c. 1394 BCE (Buddhist chronology)
- Spouse: Madravati
- Issue: Janamejaya
- House: Kuru
- Dynasty: Chandravamsh
- Father: Abhimanyu
- Mother: Uttarā

Parīkṣit (Sanskrit: परीक्षित्, IAST: Parīkṣit (Note: "Parīkṣit" is the correct Sanskrit form of the name. "Pārikṣita" refers to a son/descendant of Parikṣit, e.g. Janamejaya (Witzel 1997). Parīkṣita is a past participle meaning "examined", not a name.)) was a Kuru king who reigned during the Middle Vedic period (12th–9th centuries BCE). Along with his son and successor, Janamejaya, he played a decisive role in the consolidation of the Kuru state, the arrangement of Vedic hymns into collections, and the development of the orthodox srauta ritual, transforming the Kuru realm into the dominant political and cultural center of northern Iron Age India. He also appears as a figure in later legends and traditions. According to the legendary accounts in Mahabharata and the Puranas, he succeeded his granduncle Yudhishthira to the throne of Hastinapur. (Note: According to the Mahabharata his capital was at Hastinapura. But the Vedic literature indicates that the early Kurus had their capital at Āsandīvat, identified with modern Assandh in Haryana.)

== Introduction ==
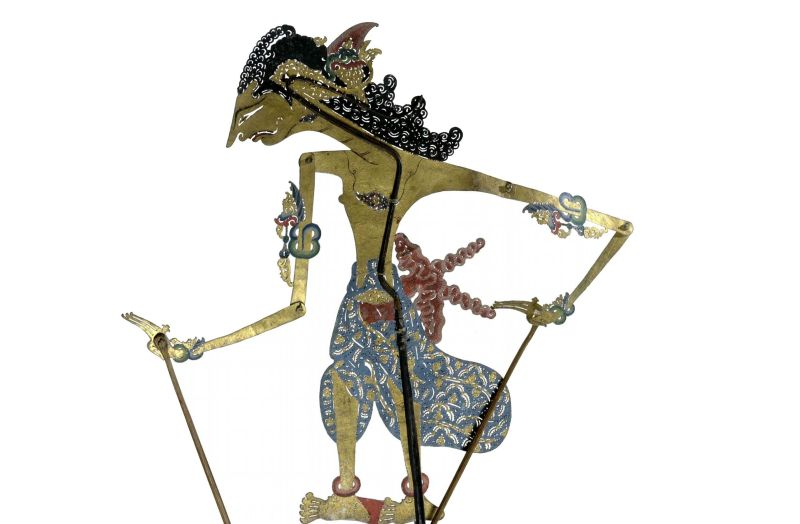
Parikesit in the Javanese wayang kulit shadow theatre

"Listen to the good praise of the King belonging to all people, who, (like) a god, is above men, (listen to the praise) of Parikṣit! - 'Parikṣit has just now made us peaceful dwelling; darkness has just now run to its dwelling.' The Kuru householder, preparing (grains) for milling, speaks (thus) with his wife. — 'What shall I bring you, sour milk, the mantha [a barley/milk drink?' the wife keeps asking in the Realm of King Pariksit. — By itself, the ripe barley bends heavily (iva) over the deep track of the path. The dynasty thrives auspiciously in the Realm of King Parikṣit.”

Parikshit is eulogised in a hymn of the Atharvaveda (XX.127.7-10) as a great Kuru king (Kauravya), whose realm flowed with milk and honey and people lived happily in his kingdom. He is mentioned as the raja vishvajanina (universal king).

According to the Mahabharata, Parikshit married princess Madravati of the Madra Kingdom, reigned for 60 years, and died. It is believed that his son, Janamejaya, succeeded the throne.

== Historicity ==
Only one Parikshit is mentioned in Vedic literature; however, post-Vedic literature (Mahabharata and Puranas) seems to indicate the existence of two kings by this name –– one who lived before the Kurukshetra War, an ancestor to the Pandavas, and one who lived later as a descendant of the Pandavas. Historian H. C. Raychaudhuri believes that the second Parikshit's description better corresponds to the Vedic king, whereas the information available about the first is scanty and inconsistent, but Raychaudhuri questions whether there were actually two distinct kings. He suggests that the doubling was eventually "invented by genealogists to account for anachronisms" in the later parts of the Mahabharata, as "a bardic duplication of the same original individual regarding whose exact place in the Kuru genealogy no unanimous tradition had survived," and therefore there "is an intrusion into the genealogical texts" of the late, post-Vedic tradition, which also has two of Parikshit's son Janamejaya. (Note: Also, Witzel (1995) only refers to one Parikshit and one Janamejaya.)

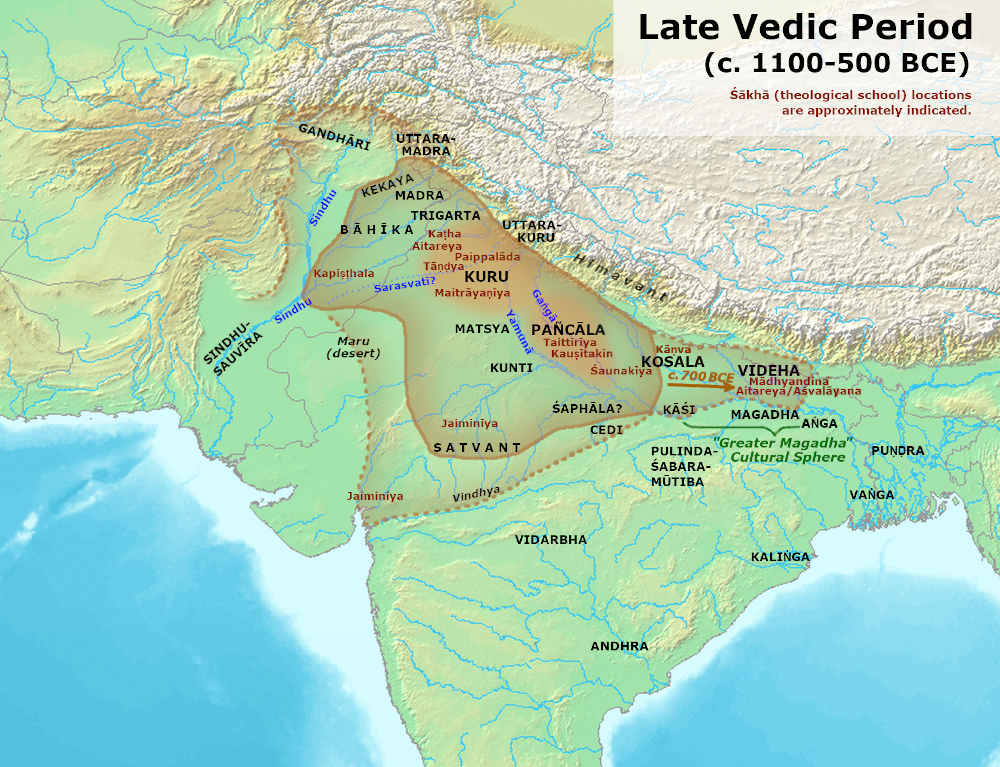
Kuru and other kingdoms of the Vedic period

Michael Witzel notes Parikṣhit to be an early Kuru king; he dates the Pārikṣita Dynasty to c. 1200–1100 BCE (the late Rig-Vedic period). In contrast, H.C. Raychaudhuri had dated him to ninth century BCE. Witzel deems Parikṣhit (along with other kings of the dynasty) to be primarily responsible for the collation of diverse strands of material into singular "national" collections — Rig Veda Samhita, Samveda Samhitas, and Khilani.

== Family ==
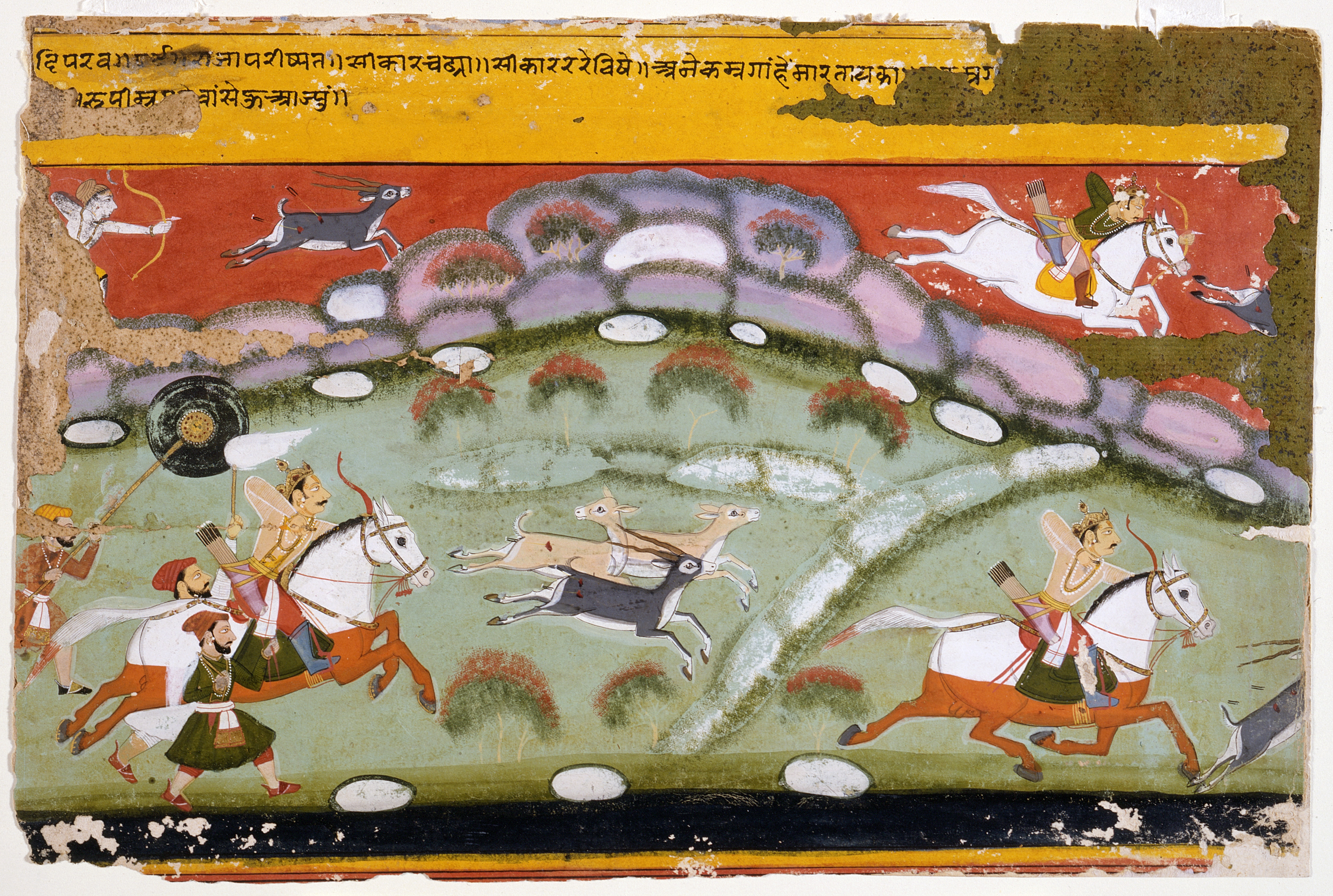
King Parikshit hunting

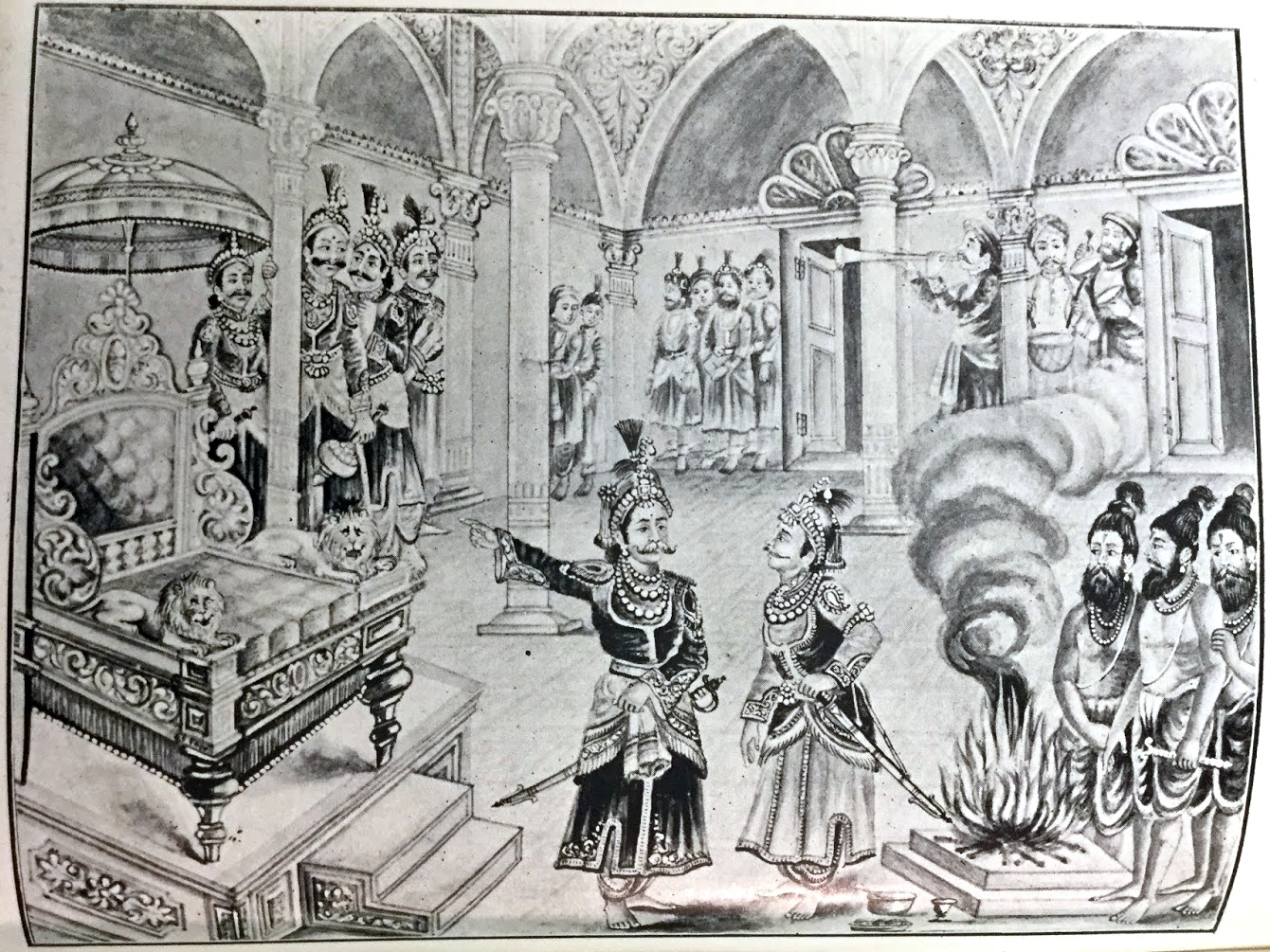
Parikshit was crowned by Yudhisthira.

Parikshit is the son of Abhimanyu and Uttara, and grandson of Arjuna.

According to the Shatapatha Brahmana (XIII.5.4), Parikshita had four sons, Janamejaya, Bhimasena, Ugrasena and Śrutasena. All of them performed the Asvamedha Yajna.

His bodily existence ended due to the curse of the sage Shringi, who used the Nāga king, Takshaka, the ruler of Taxila as the instrument of death. Parikshit was the husband of Queen Madravati and was succeeded by his son Janamejaya. According to the Mahabharata, he ruled for 60 years and died.

== Legends ==
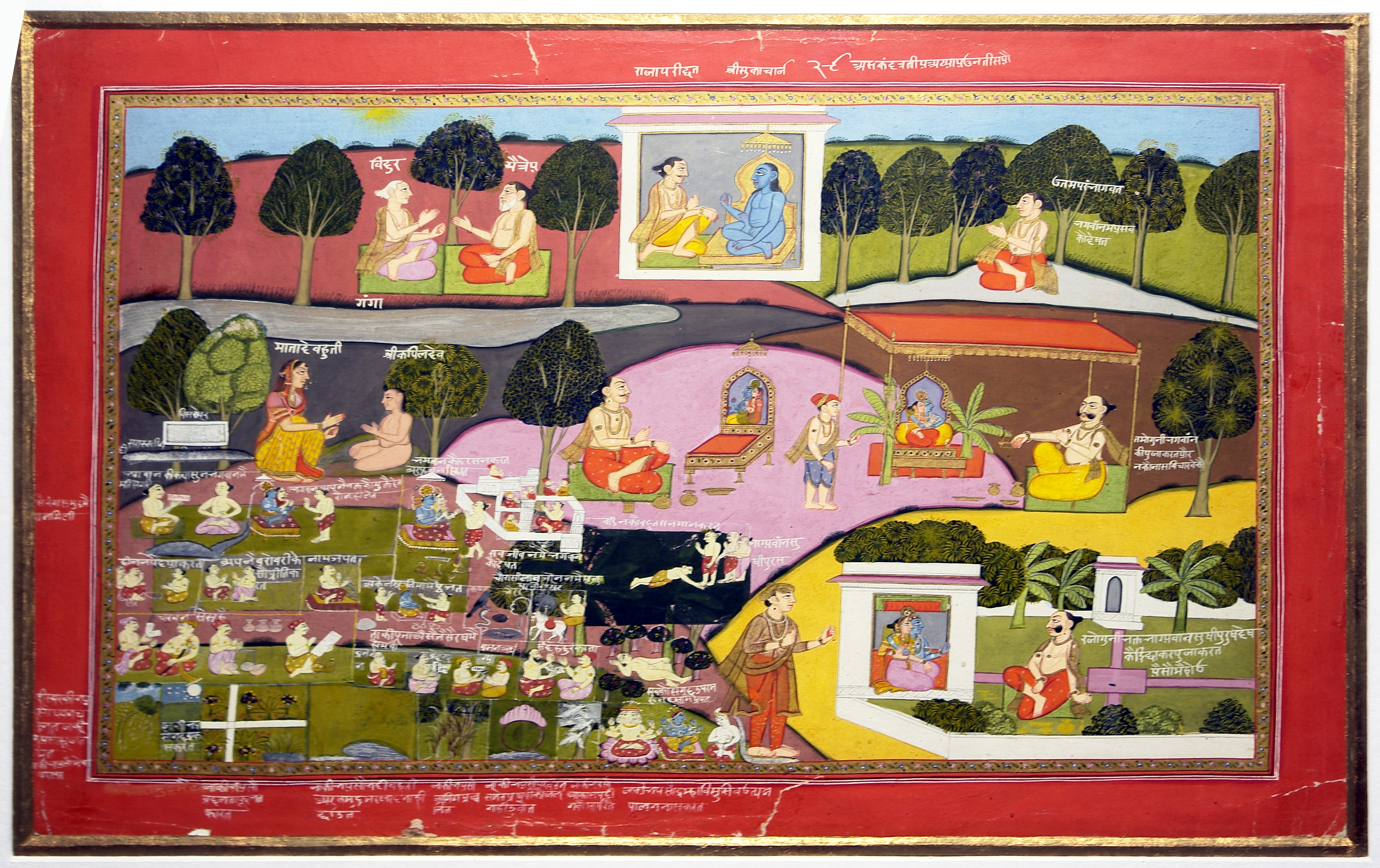
Sage Shukdeva narrating the story of Krishna to Parikshit

Parikshit is believed to be a reincarnation of Satya Yuga, the personified first yuga in Hindu scriptures. The Bhagavata Purana (1.8.9) states that the son of Drona, Ashwatthama had prepared a Brahmastra (a powerful weapon summoned to Brahma) to kill the Pandavas heir (King Parikshit), while he was in his mother's (Uttarā) womb, as a revenge against the Pandavas for killing his relatives and friends (in particular his father Drona and friend Duryodhan) in the Kurukshetra war. Uttarā was terrified by the powerful rays of the weapon and worried about her child. Her mother-in-law Subhadra prayed to Krishna, who was also her brother, for help to save their heir. Krishna pacified her and protected the child in the womb from the deadly weapon and thus saved his life. Parikshit was thus born to Uttara. He was named Vişņurāta, because Lord Vishnu had given him to the Pandavas when their race was about to become extinct. Later he was crowned heir to the Pandavas at Hastinapura.

After his coronation, he performed three sacrifices. While performing the sacrifices he traveled throughout the country. Once he saw a man beating a one-legged bull with a rod, and kicking a cow. He became angry at this sight and arrested the man. Parikshit was about to kill him when the man revealed his true identity as Kali. Kali begged forgiveness from Parikshit, who forgave him but ordered him to leave the kingdom. Kali obeyed this order and left Parikshit's kingdom. Satisfied, the cow revealed herself as the Prithvi, who was grief-stricken for Krishna had returned to his abode (Vaikuntha) and had left earth. The bull was Dharma whose other three legs were mutilated and he now only stood one leg in the Kali Yuga.

== Death ==
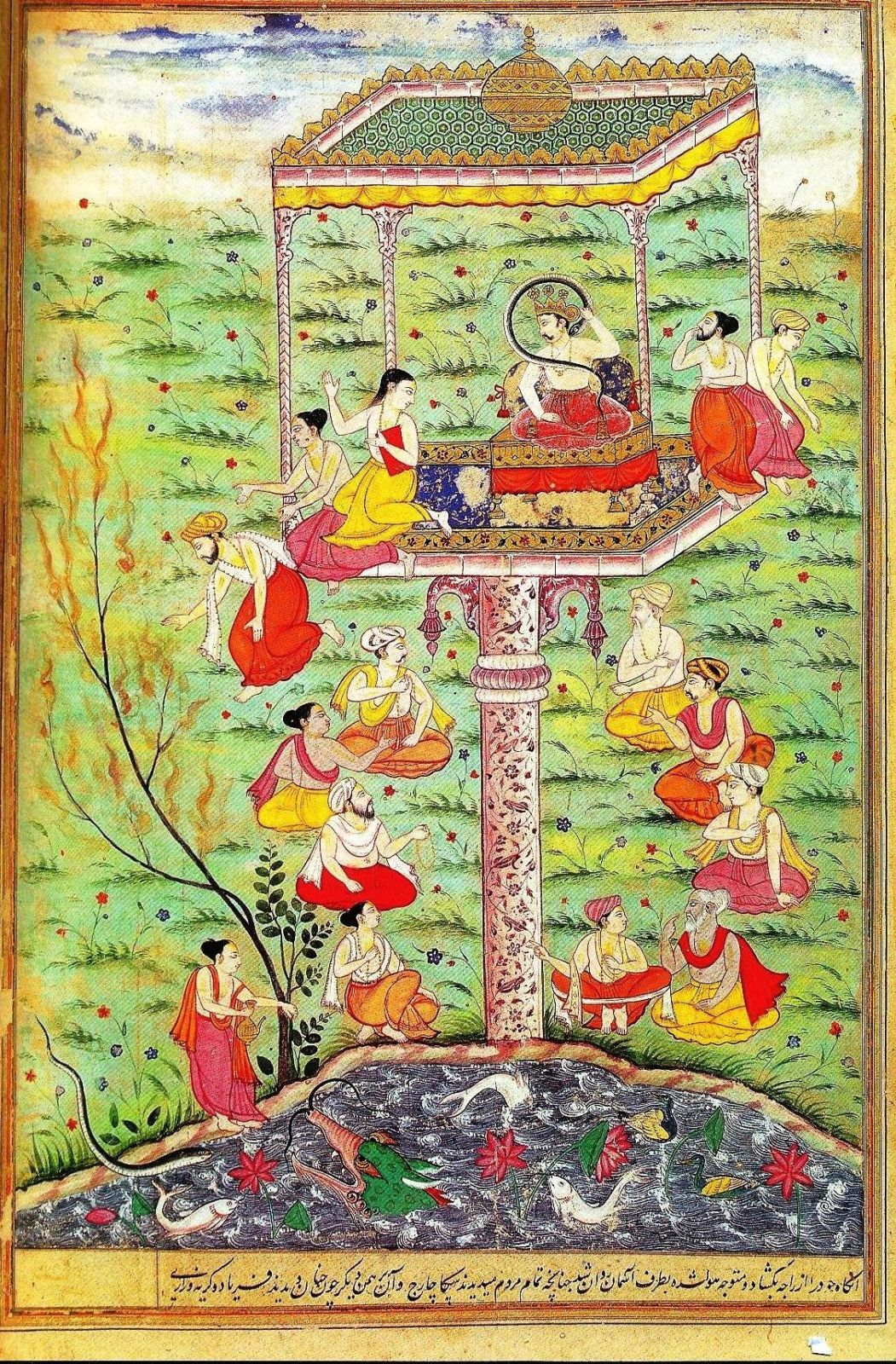
Death of Parikshit and Kashyapa alive burnt tree from Razmnama

Once while hunting, King Parikshit encountered Kali Purush who asked him for a new shelter other than his places of gambling, prostitution, vice and immoral relationship. King Parikshit allowed him to reside in gold. Though he asked him to reside in illicitly obtained gold, the crown of King happened to be of illicitly obtained gold (the crown originally belonged to Jarasandha, was taken by Bhima after killing him and wasn't returned to Jarasandha's successors), eventually Kali Purush entered King's mind. As the king crossed paths he saw sage Shamika meditating and asked him the whereabouts of a deer which he was hunting. But the sage did not respond as he was meditating. Angry at this, Parikshit tossed a dead snake around the sage's neck due to the ill effects of Kali Purush in his mind. The sage had a son named Shringi (not to be confused with Shringi in Ramayan), who heard this incident from another sage's son named Krisa. He became furious as he didn't know the deceit played by Kali Purush. He cursed Parikshit to die of a snakebite in seven days, for disrespecting his father, Rishi Shamika.

When Shamika learned of the curse his son had given, he was disappointed. Shamika ordered his disciple Gaurmukha to go to Parikshit and tell him everything about his death. When Parikshit heard about the curse he accepted his fate, but the ministers created a mansion that would stand on a solitary column and remain well guarded.

Kashyapa, a sage who knew how to cure snakebites was coming for the king. But Takshaka changed the mind of the sage by offering him more wealth. Takshaka came to the king in form of a worm in fruits and bit Parikshit, which instantly led to his death.

The death of Parikshit is also recorded by another episode when the Pandavas conquered Khandavaprastha (now known as Indraprastha). Takshaka is the head of snakes, who was residing in Nagaloka without any human disturbance. When the Pandavas arrived, Takshaka felt his freedom is seized, with pure anger, he ordered his troops to attack the Pandavas and their subjects. The widespread attack resulted in the death of many people, or everyone except the Pandavas and their wife Draupadi. After this incident, Arjuna, the third Pandava, lifted his bow and set fire to the Nagaloka. Takshaka grew even more furious and vowed to kill one of the lineages of the Pandavas. The vow of Takshaka and the curse of Rishi Shamika's son Shringi gave the ultimate destiny of Parikshit that he will be killed by a snakebite.

On hearing of his father's death by Takshaka, Parikshit's son Janamejaya vowed to kill Takshaka within a week. He starts the Sarpasatra, a yagna, which forced each and every snake in the universe to fall in the havan kund. However, Indra tries to save Takshaka from getting pulled in sacrifice. The sages who perform sacrifice start chanting "Indraay swaahaa, Takshakaay cha swaahaa". Due to this, even Indra starts getting pulled in the sacrifice. Later, this yagna/sacrifice was stopped from doing so by Astika Muni (who is the son of Manasa Devi). Thus, Takshaka was spared, and Janamejaya stops his Sarpasatra. That day was Shukla Paksha Panchami in the month of Shravana and is since celebrated as the festival of Naga Panchami.

== Succession ==
Parikshit was succeeded by his son Janamejaya.

== See also ==
- Kuru kingdom
- Hindu mythology
- Janaka
- Bimbisara
- Historicity of the Mahabharata
