= Janamejaya =

King of Kuru Kingdom

- Raja
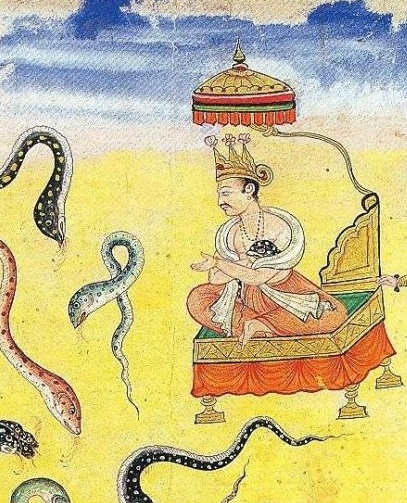
- Depiction of Janamejaya in the Razmnama

King of Kuru
- Reign: 12th–9th century BCE
- Predecessor: Parikṣit
- Successor: Ashwamedhadatha
- House: Kuru
- Dynasty: Chandravamsh
- Father: Pariksit

Janamejaya (Sanskrit: जनमेजय) was a Kuru king who reigned during the Middle Vedic period. Along with his father and predecessor Parikshit, he played a decisive role in the consolidation of the Kuru state, the arrangement of Vedic hymns into collections, and the development of the orthodox srauta rituals, transforming the Kuru realm into the dominant political and cultural region of northern India. He also appears as a figure in later legends and traditions, the Mahabharata and the Puranas.

== Etymology ==
The name Janamejaya means "man-impelling" or "victorious from birth".

== In Vedic literature ==
The Aitareya Brāhmaṇa states that he was a great conqueror and that his purohita (family priest) Tura Kāvaṣeya consecrated him as king and officiated his aśvamedha (horse sacrifice). It also states that at one of his sacrifices he did not employ the Kaśyapas as priests but rather the Bhūtavīras. It states that the Asitamr̥ga family of Kaśyapas were eventually reemployed by Janamejaya. The Śatapatha Brāhmaṇa mentions that he along with his brothers Ugrasena, Bhīmasena, and Śrutasena performed an aśvamedha, officiated by Indrota Daivāpa Śaunaka, in order to cleanse themselves of sin. Both previous Brāhmaṇas state that his capital was Āsandīvat. The Gopatha Brahmana narrates an "absurd" anecdote regarding Janamejaya and two ganders.

The Pañcaviṃśa Brāhmaṇa mentions a Janamejaya who was a priest at a snake sacrifice, but Macdonell and Keith consider him to be a different person than Janamejaya the Kuru king.

== Historicity ==
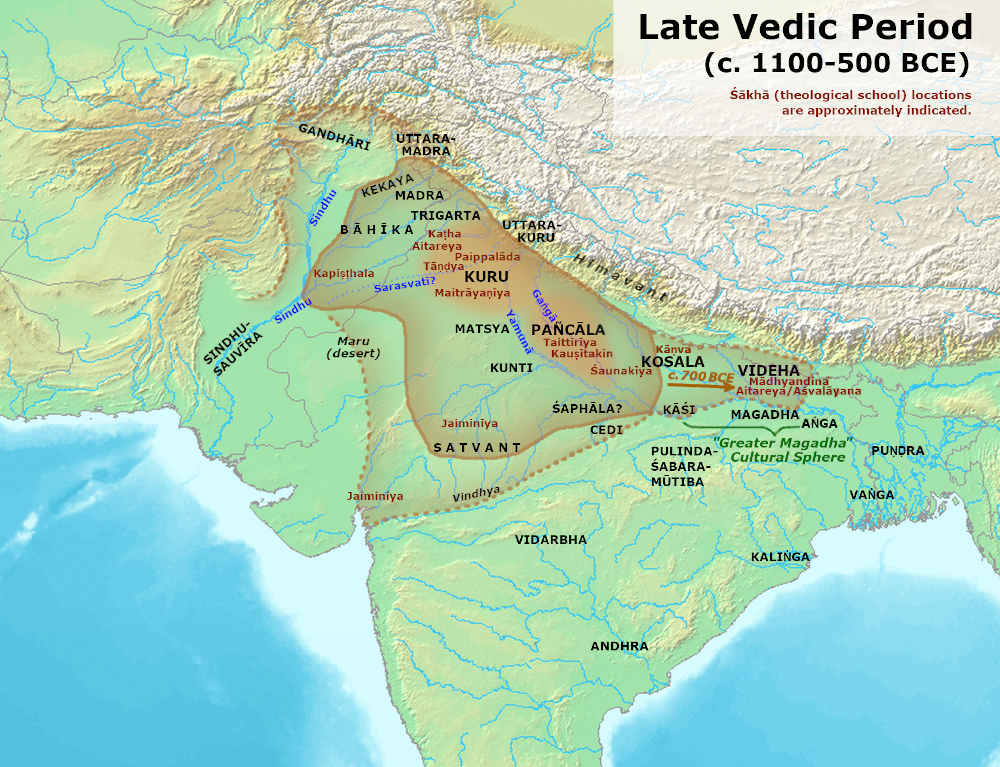
Kuru and other kingdoms of the Vedic period

H.C. Raychaudhuri dates Parikshit, his father, in ninth century BC. Michael Witzel states the Pārikṣita dynasty corresponds with the presence of Black and Red Ware in the Punjab and West and South regions of North India, which archeologically dates to 1180 BCE.

Historian H. C. Raychaudhuri notes that there are two pairs of Parikṣhits and Janamejayas in epic and Puranic genealogies, but believes that the second Janamejaya's description better corresponds to the Vedic king, whereas the information available about the first is scant and inconsistent, but Raychaudhuri questions whether there were actually two distinct kings. He suggests that there "is an intrusion into the genealogical texts" of the late, post-Vedic tradition, which also has two of Janamejaya's father Parikṣit, possibly "invented by genealogists to account for anachronisms" in the later parts of the Mahābhārata, as "a bardic duplication of the same original individual regarding whose exact place in the Kuru genealogy no unanimous tradition had survived." (Note: Also, Witzel (1995) only refers to one Parikshit and one Janamejaya.)

Four copper-plate grant inscriptions purportedly issued during Janamejaya's reign were discovered in the 20th century, but were proved to be fake by historians.

== In Puranic literature ==
Janamejaya
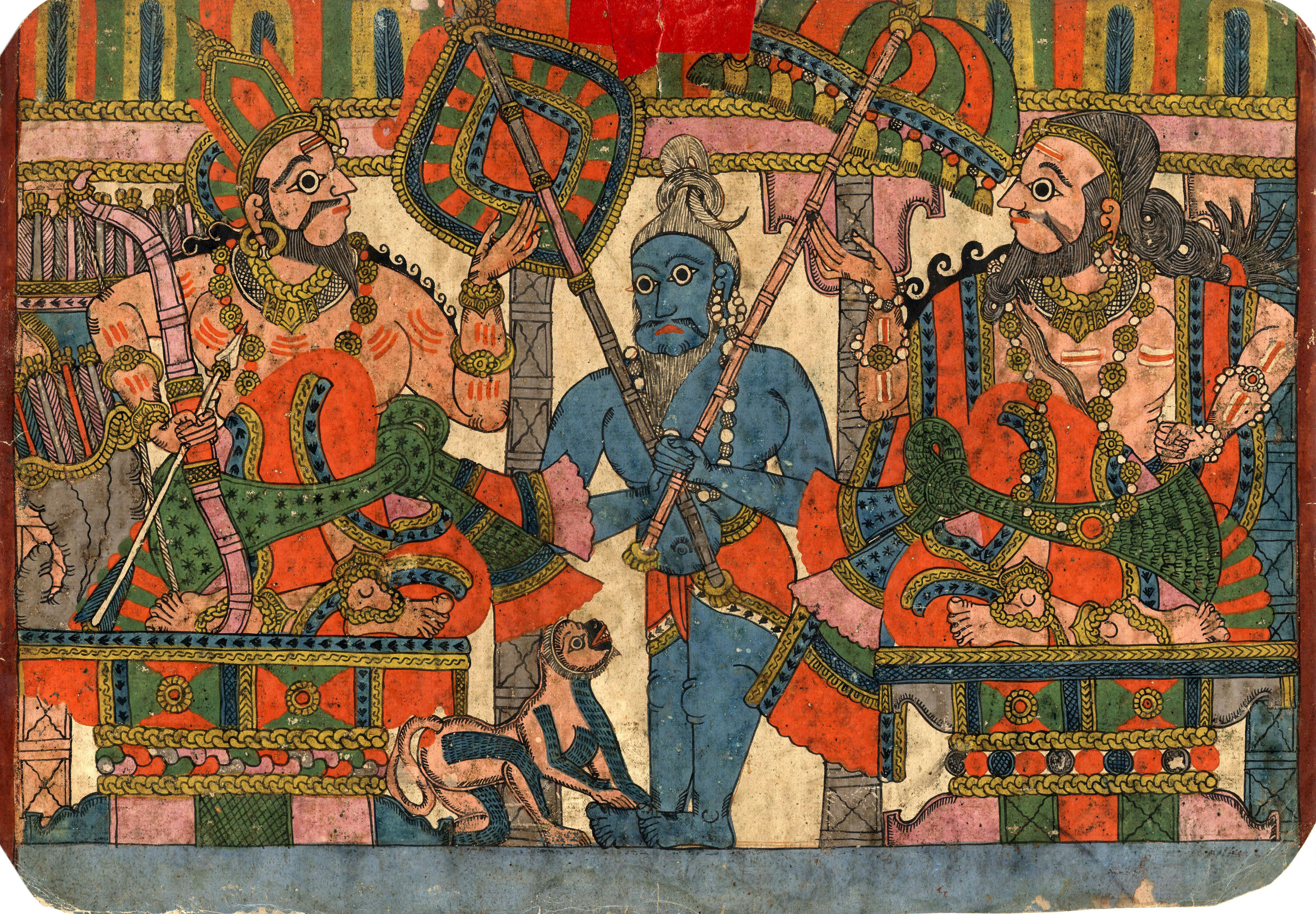
- The sage Vyasa and King Janamejaya

Personal Information
- Affiliation: Kurus
- Spouse: Vapushtama
- Children: Shantanika, Sankukarna
- Relatives: Parikṣit (father), Madravti (mother), Ashvamedhadatta (grandson)

He was the son of King Parikshit and Queen Madravati according to the Mahabharata (I.95.85). He was the grandson of great warrior Abhimanyu and the great-grandson of Arjuna, the valiant warrior hero of the Mahābhārata. He ascended to the Kuru throne following the death of his father. His significance comes as the listener of the first narration of the Mahābhārata, narrated by Vaishampayana, a pupil of Vyasa. According to the Vayu Purana and the Matsya Purana, there was a dispute between him and Vaishampayana. Possibly, as its aftermath, he abdicated and his son Shatanika succeeded him. Also the Devi Bhagavata Purana was narrated to him by Vyasa.

=== In Mahabharata ===
In Mahabharata, Janamejaya was mentioned as having three able brothers, Srutasena, Ugrasena and Bhimasena. The initial chapters of the epic narrate various aspects of his life including his conquest of Takshasila and about his encounter with Nāga Takshaka. He wanted to exterminate the race of Takshaka who was responsible for the death of his father Parikshit.

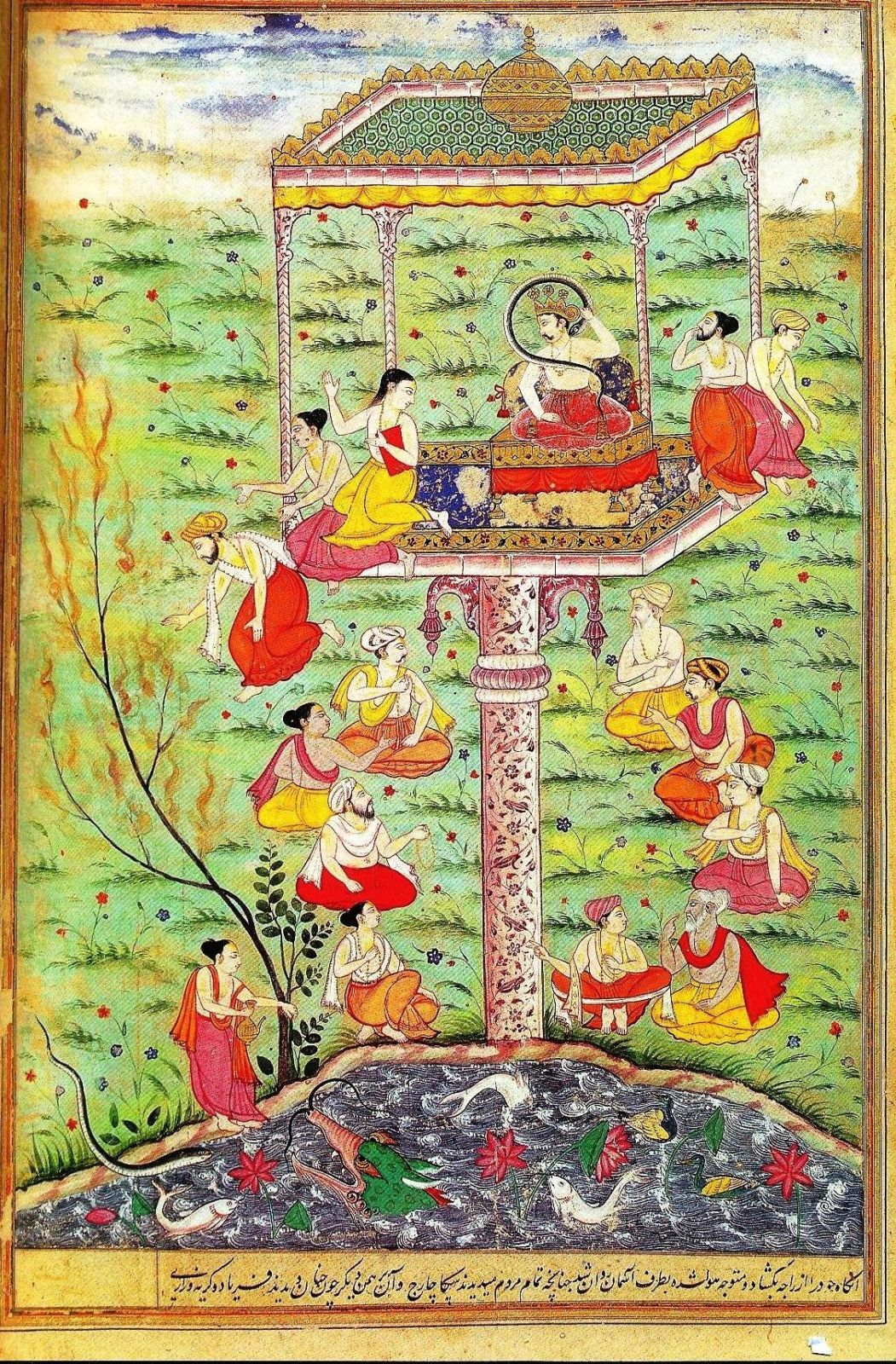
Parikshit bitten by Takshak from Razmnama.

King Janamejaya was responsible for the retelling of the famous epic Mahābhārata, a story of Janamejaya's ancestors from the time of Bharata up to the great Kurukshetra War between his great-grandfathers the Pandavas and their paternal cousins the Kauravas. The Mahabharata states that it was recited to Janamejaya at the sarpa satra (snake sacrifice) by the sage Vaishampayana to whom it had been imparted by his preceptor Vedavyasa, after he asked Vaishampayana about his ancestors.

=== Sarpa Satra (snake sacrifice) ===
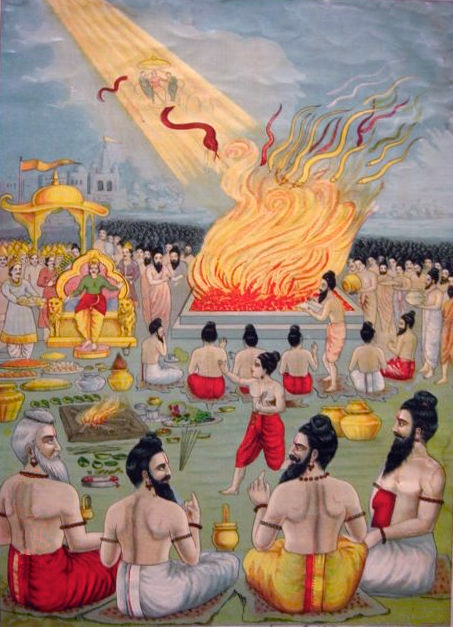
The snake sacrifice of Janamejaya, as Astika tries to stop it

King Janamejaya ascended to the throne of Hastinapura upon the death of his father Parikshit. According to legend, Parikshit, the lone descendant of the House of Pandu, had died of snakebite. He had been cursed by a sage to die so, the curse having been consummated by the Naga King Takshaka. Janamejaya bore a deep grudge against the serpents for this act, and thus decided to wipe them out altogether. He attempted this by performing a great Sarpa Satra – a sacrifice that would destroy all living serpents. At that time, a learned sage named Astika, a boy in age, came and interfered. His mother Manasa is Nagmata, daughter of sage Kashyapa and his father is sage Jaratkaru. Janamejaya had to listen to the words of the learned Astika and set the then-imprisoned Takshaka free. He also stopped the genocide of the Nagas and ended all enmity with them (1,56). From that time onward, the Nagas and Kurus lived in peace. The mass sacrifice was started on the banks of the river Arind at Bardan, now known as Parham, a corrupt form of Parikshitgarh. A masonry tank (reservoir) said to have been built by King Janamejaya to mark the site of the sacrificial pit, known as Parikshit kund, still exists in Mainpuri district. This is known as Gowdvana. Close to this village a very large and high Khera-(Regional Word meaning Hamlet) containing the ruins of a fort and some stone sculptures has been found. It is said to date back to the time of King Parikshit. A popular local legend is that as a consequence of the virtues of that sacrifice snakes are still harmless in this place and its neighborhood.

== Succession ==
Janamejaya was succeeded by his grandson Ashwamedhadatha.

== See also ==
- Kuru kingdom
- Hindu mythology
- Takshaka
- Janaka
- Bimbisara
- Historicity of the Mahabharata
