= Bhrigu =

Legendary Hindu sage

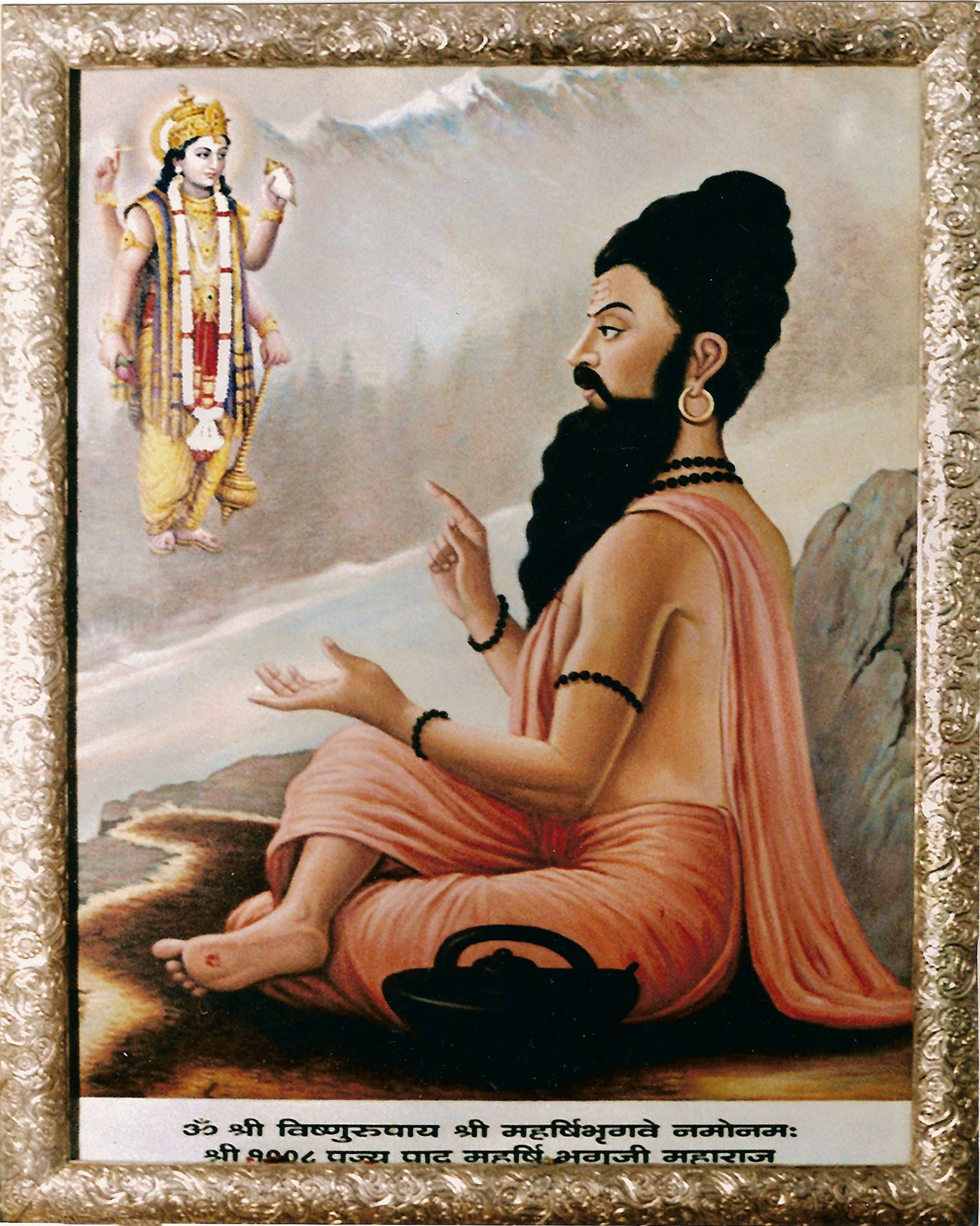
- A painting depicting Bhṛgu
- Affiliation: Saptarishi

Genealogy
- Parents: Brahma (father)
- Spouse: Kavyamata, Puloma, Khyati, Divyadevi, and Paulami
- Children: Shukra (from Kavyamata); Chyavana (from Puloma); Dhata, Vidhata, and Lakshmi (from Khyati); Tvashta (from Divyadevi); Richika (from Paulami)

Bhrigu (Sanskrit: Bhṛgu) is a rishi in Hinduism. He is one of the seven great sages, the Saptarshi, and one of the many Prajapatis (facilitators of creation) created by Brahma. He was the first compiler of predictive astrology and also the author of Bhrigu Samhita, an astrological (jyotisha) classic. Bhrigu is considered a mānasaputra ('mind-born son') of Brahma. The adjectival form of the name, Bhārgava, is used to refer to the descendants and the school of Bhrigu. According to the Manusmṛti, Bhrigu was a compatriot and companion of Manu, the protoplast (first human). Along with Manu, Bhrigu made important contributions to the Manusmṛti, which was constituted out of a sermon to a congregation of saints in the state of Brahmavarta, after the great floods in this area. As per the Skanda Purana, Bhrigu migrated to Bhrigukaccha, modern Bharuch, on the banks of the Narmada in Gujarat, leaving his son Chyavana at Dhosi Hill.

According to the Bhagavata Purana, he was married to Khyati, one of the nine daughters of Kardama. She was the mother of Lakshmi as Shri. They also had two sons named Dhata and Vidhata. He had one more son with Kavyamata, who is better known than Bhrigu himself: Shukra, guru of the asuras. The sage Chyavana is also said to be his son with Puloma, as is the folk hero Mrikanda. [Maha:1.5] One of his descendants was sage Jamadagni, who in turn was the father of sage Parashurama, considered an avatar of Vishnu.

== Legends ==
Bhṛgu is mentioned in the Shiva Purana and the Vayu Purana, where he is shown present during the great yajna of Daksha (his father-in-law). He supports the continuation of the Daksha yajna even after being warned that without an offering for Shiva, it was asking for a catastrophe for everyone present there. In the Tattiriya Upanishad, he is described to have had a conversation with his father Varuni on Brahman.

In the Bhagavad Gita, Krishna says that among sages, Bhrigu is the representative of the opulence of God.

=== Testing the Trimurti ===
The Bhagavata Purana describes a legend in which sages gathered at the bank of the river Sarasvati to participate in a great yajna. The gathered sages could not decide who among the Trimurti (supreme trinity) of Brahma, Vishnu, and Shiva was pre-eminent and should be the recipient of the yajna. They deputed Bhrigu to determine this answer.

Upon being entrusted with the task, Bhṛgu decided to test each of the Trimurti. He first visited Brahma at Brahmaloka, and to test his patience, he refused to sing in his praise or prostrate before him. Brahma grew angry, but realised that his son was testing him and allowed him to pass. Bhṛgu left for Kailasha, the abode of Shiva. Upon seeing the sage, Shiva rose to his feet and moved forward with great joy to embrace the sage. Bhṛgu, however, refused the embrace, and tested him by calling the deity a maligner of social conventions and rituals. Shiva was infuriated and prepared to strike the sage with his trident, but was calmed by his consort, Parvati. The sage then travelled to the abode of Vishnu, Vaikuntha. Vishnu was resting his head on the lap of Lakshmi when the sage arrived. Bhṛgu kicked Vishnu on the chest to wake him up, enraged by the perceived insult. Vishnu woke up, greeted Bhṛgu, and starts massaging his feet, regarding his chest to have been sanctified due to its contact with the sage's foot. Overpowered with emotion, Bhṛgu went back to the sages and declared Vishnu to be the greatest among the Trimurti.

According to some traditions, Vishnu's consort Lakshmi grew angry at him because the chest was considered as Lakshmi's place (vakshasthala) and left Vaikuntha to be born on earth. She was found on a lotus flower, and was raised by Bhrigu and his wife Khyati, which is why another name of Lakshmi is Bhargavi, daughter of Bhṛgu. Since she was found on a lotus, she is also called Padmavati.

A variation of this is the legend behind Tirupati, in which a furious Lakshmi is reborn as Padmavati on earth and Vishnu assumes the form of Srinivasa and Venkateswara.

== Associated sites ==
Bhrigu is regarded to have had his ashram (hermitage) on the Vadhusar River, a tributary of the Drishadwati River near Dhosi Hill in the state of Brahmavarta, presently on the border of Haryana and the Jhunjhunu district of Rajasthan in India.

His son Chyavana, known for Chyavanprash also had his āśrama at Dhosi Hill. Bhṛgu is also worshipped at Bharuch, Swamimalai, Tirumala, Ballia, Nanguneri, Thiruneermalai, and Mannargudi.

An āśrama for Bhṛgu is in Maruderi, Chengalpattu district in Tamil Nadu. Khedbrahma in Gujarat is associated with Brahma and Bhṛgu's legend of testing the Trimurti. Lastly, Bhṛgu migrated to Bhuinj Satara, Maharashtra where he took Samadhi. His āśrama and his daughter's temple also situated there. His son's āśrama and samadhi are also situated on Chyavaneshwar hill near Bhuinj.

== Literature ==
=== Upanishads ===
In Tattiriya Upanishad, first six anuvakas of Bhrigu Valli are called Bhargavi Varuni Vidya, which means "the knowledge Bhrigu got from (his father) Varuni". It is in these anuvakas that sage Varuni advises Bhrigu with one of the oft-cited definition of Brahman, as "that from which beings originate, through which they live, and in which they re-enter after death, explore that because that is Brahman". This thematic, all encompassing, eternal nature of reality and existence develops as the basis for Bhrigu's emphasis on introspection and inwardization, to help peel off the outer husks of knowledge, in order to reach and realize the innermost kernel of spiritual self-knowledge.

=== Bhrigu Samhita ===
Bhrigu decided to write his famous books of astrology, the Bhrigu Samhita. Bhrigu collected birth charts, wrote full-life predictions, and compiled them together as Bhrigu Samhita. Bhrigu Samhita is believed to be one of the first book of its kind in the field of astrology.

== Lineage ==
The lineage of Bhrigu includes Shukra, Chyavana, Aurva, Richika, Jamadagni, Parashurama, Bhargava, Balai, and Dadhichi.

=== Shukra ===
Shukra, son of Bhṛgu, is considered to be a Daitya-Guru, teacher of the Asuras. Shukra learned the mṛtyu sañjivini vidya from Lord Shiva, with which he could revive the dead and grant them immortality. Additionally, Shukra is also known the planet Venus in astronomical terms.

=== Chyavana ===
Once, while Puloma was pregnant with Chyavana, Bhṛgu had gone for a bath. While he was gone, an asura who was also named Puloma came to Bhrigu's āśrama in the form of a boar and kidnapped, or carried away, Bhṛgu's wife. Because of this, Bhṛgu's wife had a miscarriage. Despite being prematurely born, the infant was radiating light like the sun, which burned the asura into ashes. Later, when Puloma went back to Bhrigu with her prematurely-born yet miraculous child, Bhṛgu asked her how the asura had come to know of the location of the āśrama. She revealed that it was Agni who had told the asura Puloma about their whereabouts. Angered, Bhṛgu cursed Agni that he would consume all that came in his way.

=== Aurva ===
Aurva was the son of Chyavana and his wife Aarushi (daughter of Manu).

After King Krutavirya's death, his sons invaded the Bhargava rishis' ashrams to get their wealth. Since the Kshatriyas were hunting them down, the rishis had to leave their ashrams. Among the fleers was Aarushi, who was pregnant at that time. In order to protect her unborn child, she hid her garbha (womb) in her thigh as she fled. The Kshatriyas, however, found out about this and caught her. As she was getting captured, her thigh broke and a child came out. The child was radiating immensely, and his light blinded the Kshatriya kings. The kings realized their mistakes and asked for forgiveness. The child, who was Aurva, returned their eyesight, however, his strong hatred towards the Kshatriyas remained even as he grew older. Aurva began to perform austerities to bring justice to his ancestors (pitrus) for how the Kshatriya kings had treated them, and the rigorousness of his austerities caused the world to start burning down. Frightened by the destruction caused by Aurva's intense austerities, Aurva's pitrus appeared before him, and pleaded him to withdraw the fire, force it into the ocean, and stop his austerities to prevent further damage.
