= INS Sukanya =

Indian naval vessel

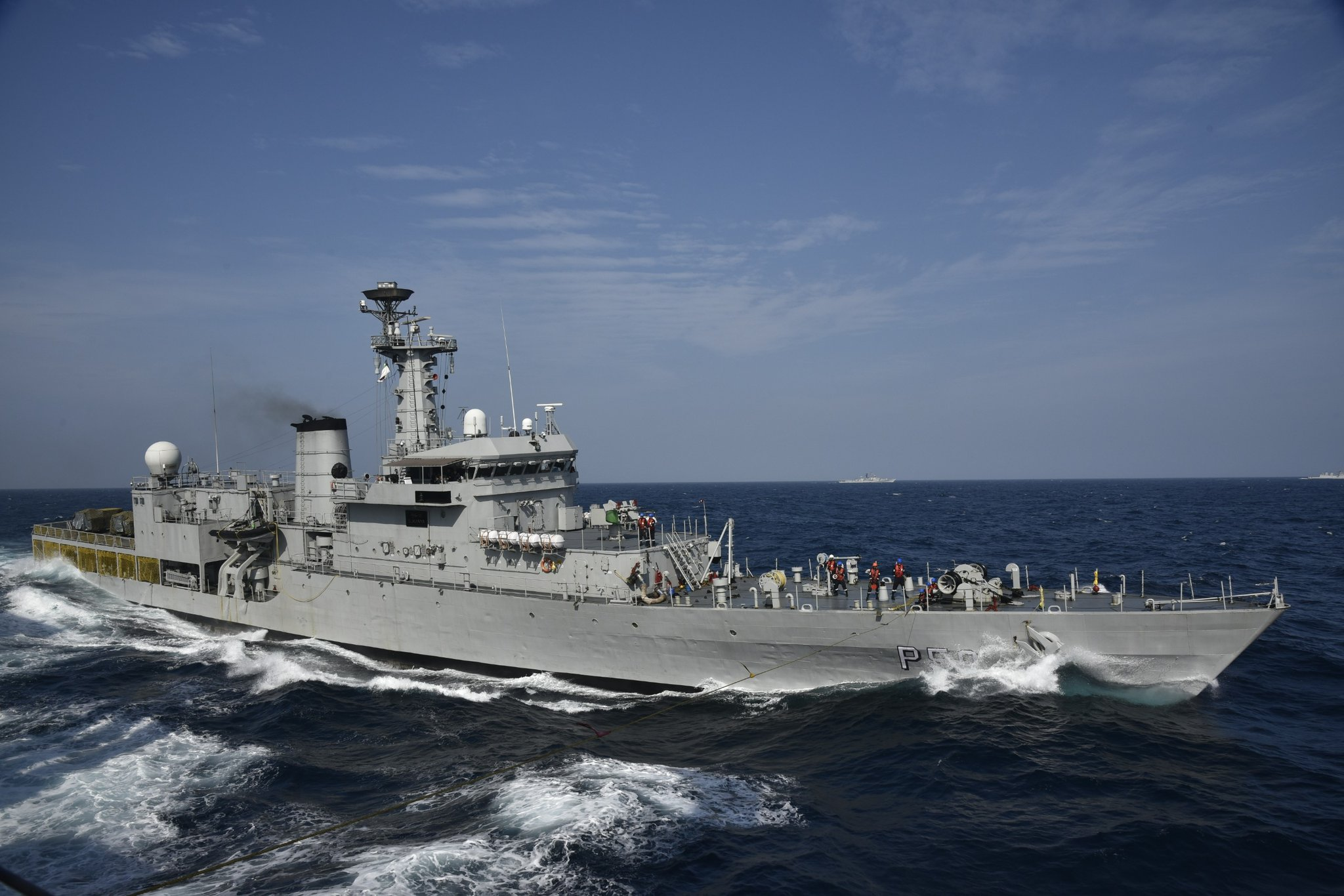
- Sukanya at sea

History

India
- Name: INS Sukanya
- Namesake: Sukanya
- Commissioned: 31 August 1989
- Status: Active
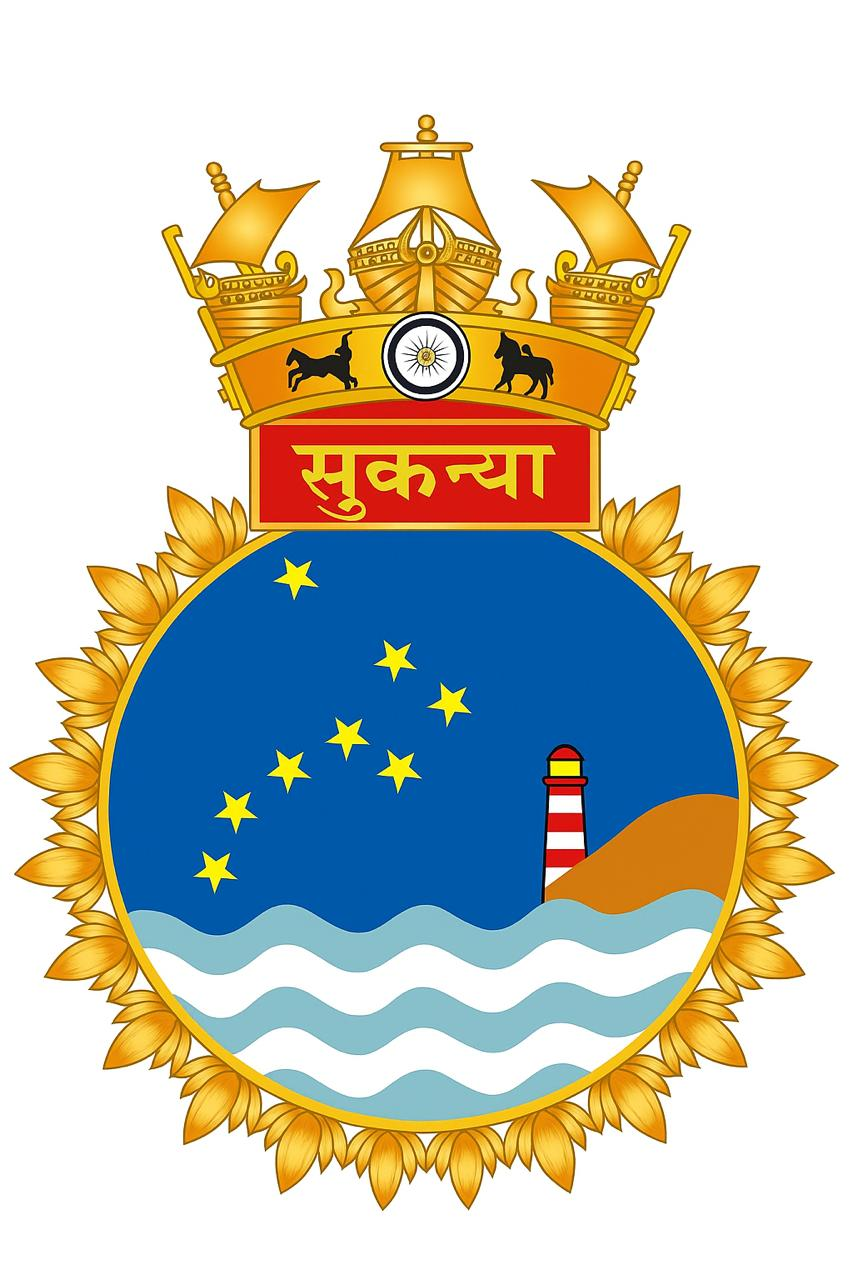
- Badge

General characteristics
- Class & type: Sukanya-class patrol vessel
- Displacement: 1,890 tons (full load)
- Length: 101 m (331 ft 4 in)
- Beam: 11.5 m (37 ft 9 in)
- Propulsion: 2 × diesel engines, 12,800 bhp (9,540 kW), 2 shafts
- Speed: 21 knots (39 km/h)
- Range: 7,000 nautical miles (13,000 km) at 15 knots (28 km/h)
- Complement: 70
- Sensors & processing systems: 1 × Racal Decca 2459 search radar; 1 BEL 1245 navigation radar
- Armament: 1 × 40 mm, 60 cal. Bofors anti-aircraft gun; 2 × 12.7 mm machine guns; P51 added: 1 Dhanush ballistic missile; P55 added: 2 x 25 mm, 80 cal. anti-aircraft guns
- Aircraft carried: 1 HAL Chetak
- Notes: Two onboard desalination plants to produce 20 tonnes of fresh water daily

INS Sukanya is the lead vessel of the Sukanya-class patrol vessels of the Indian Navy. In Sanatana Dharma, Sukanya was the daughter of Shryayati, son of Vaivasvata Manu and the wife of the great sage Chyavana. It was commissioned into service on 31 August 1989.

== Service history ==
In 2006, INS Sukanya served as the Presidential yacht for the 2006 Naval Fleet Review. In February 2010, Sukanya escorted the Maldivian Coast Guard vessel MCGS Hurawee home via Colombo, Sri Lanka. Huravee was returning home after a refit in India.

On 20 and 24 September 2011, pirates in the Gulf of Aden attempted to approach vessels being escorted by INS Sukanya. The attack was warded off and the pirates disarmed by a team of marine commandos. Indian Navy officials seized three rifles, eight magazines and about 320 rounds of ammunition from the pirate boat with 14 pirates. Ladders and grapnels used by pirates to board merchant vessels were recovered. The boat was carrying a large quantity of fuel and LPG cylinders, in addition to communication and navigation equipment. This was the fourth time INS Sukanya thwarted a pirate attack in the Gulf of Aden. On 11 November 2011, Sukanya again thwarted piracy attempts near the Gulf of Aden.

In December 2014, a fire damaged the only de-salination plant in Maldives plunging it into a severe water crisis. On 4 December 2014, Sukanya led by Commander M. Dorai Babu, NM, while patrolling off Kochi, was immediately diverted to Maldives. The ship had two de-salination plants on board with capacity to produce 20 tonnes of fresh water daily which were used to avert the water crisis.

On 18 November 2025, Sukanya arrived at the Port of Colombo, Sri Lanka, for an operational turnaround. The vessel departed the island on 21 November. The ship was again deployed to Sri Lanka to supply 12 tonnes of disaster relief materials as part of Operation Sagar Bandhu on 1 December. She participated at the International Fleet Review 2026 held at Visakapatanam.

== Gallery ==
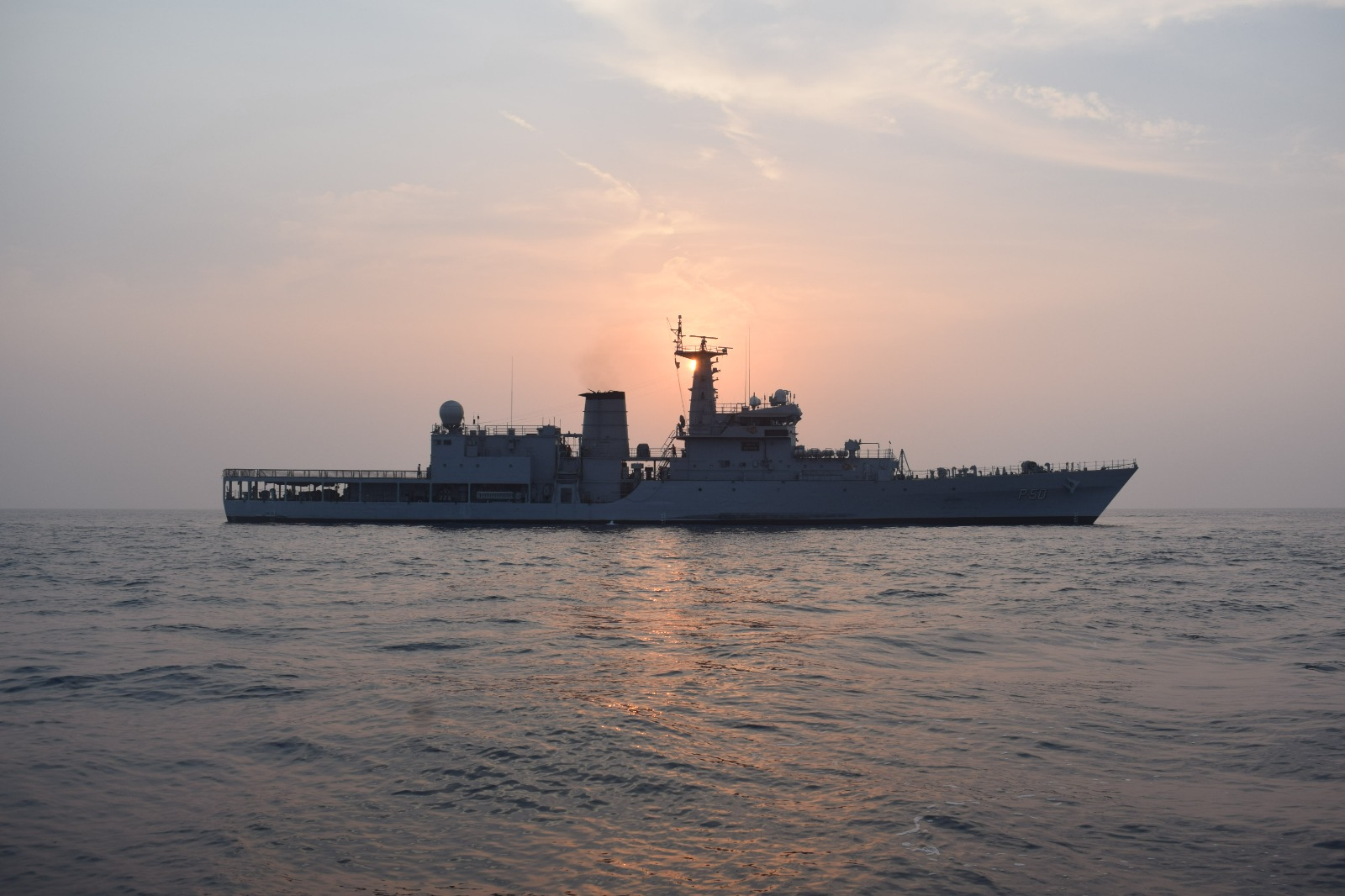
INS Sukanya (P50) at sea.

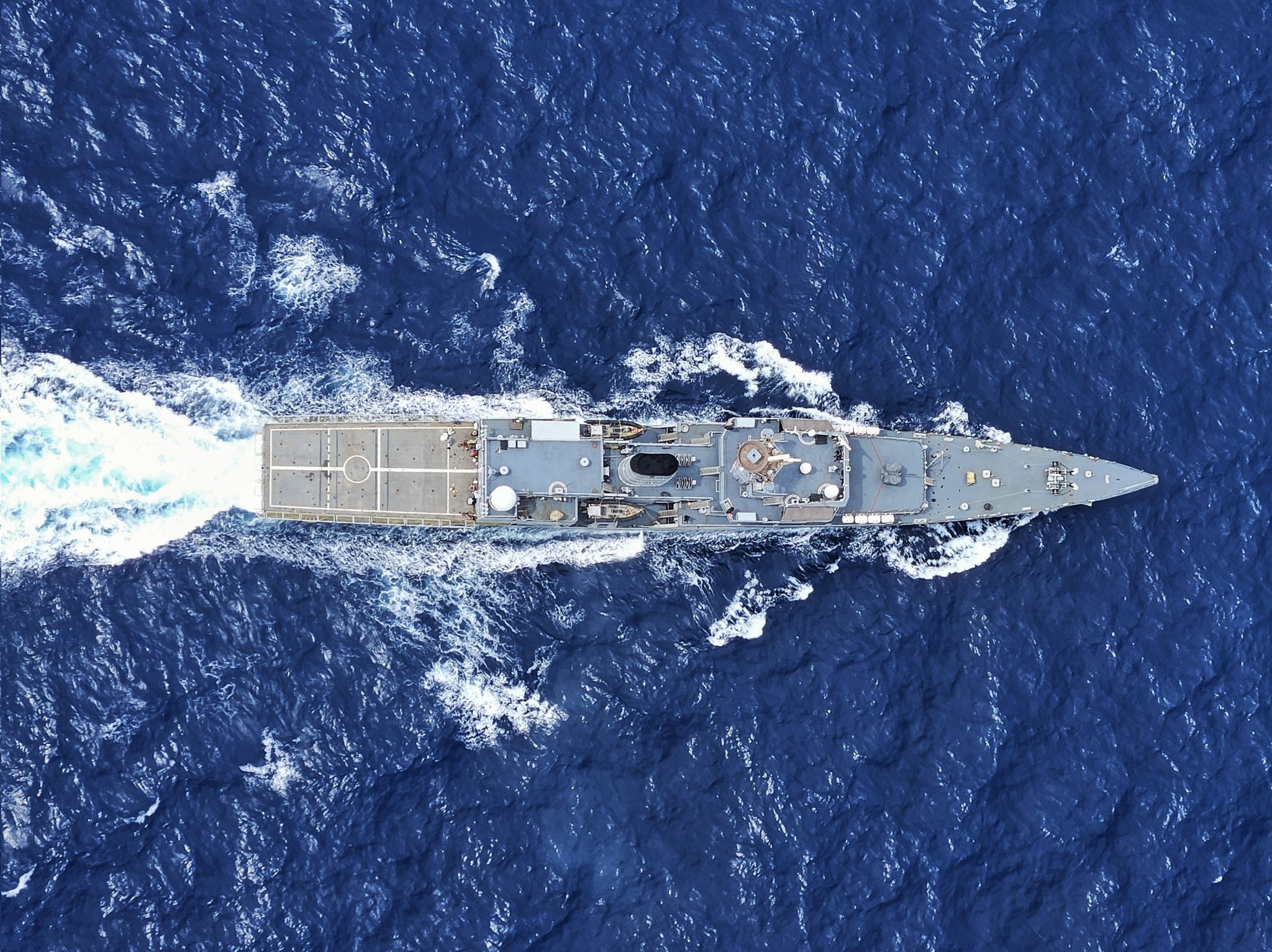
Top view of INS Sukanya (P50).

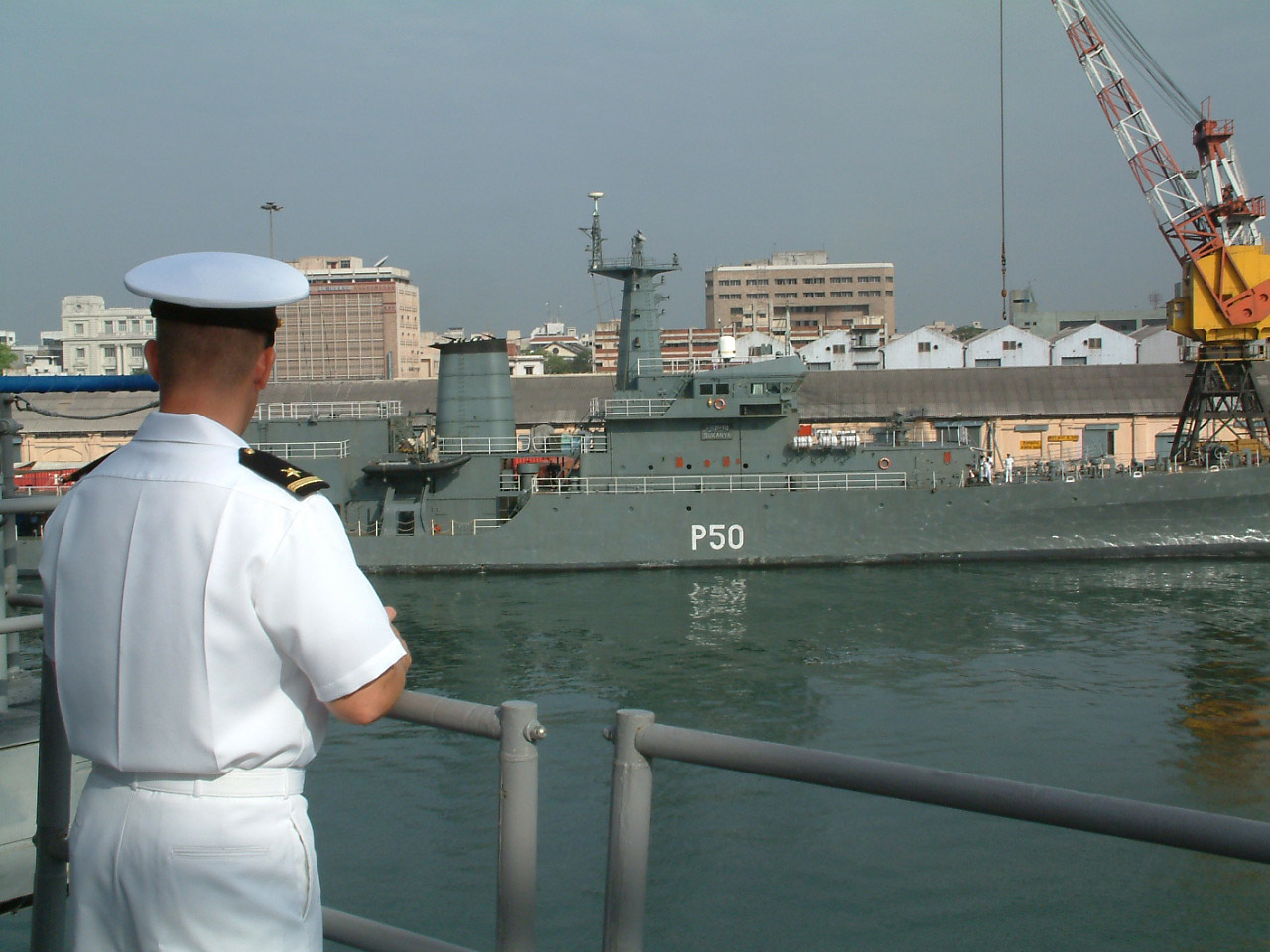
