= Karoh Peak =

Mountain in Haryana, India

- Location within Haryana Location within India

Highest point
- Elevation: 1,467 m (4,813 ft)
- Listing: List of Indian states and territories by highest point
- Coordinates: 30°44′37″N 77°04′37″E

Geography
- Location: Panchkula district, Haryana, India
- Parent range: Sivalik Hills of Himalayas

Climbing
- Easiest route: Hike / scramble

Karoh Peak is a 1,467-metre (4,813 ft) tall mountain peak in the Sivalik Hills range of greater Himalayas range located near Morni Hills area of Panchkula district, Haryana, India. It is the highest point in the state of Haryana.

The British rulers had incorrectly recorded the height to be 1499 metres in The Imperial Gazetteer of India, but later measurements by the Survey of India found the actual height to be about 100 feet (30 metres) lower; therefore, the official height was revised down.

== See also ==
- Morni Hills, Panchkula district, 1267 m peak
- Dhosi Hill, Narnaul - Hill of Chyavana Rishi creator of Chyawanprash, 740 m peak
- Tosham, 240 m average elevation
- Madhogarh, Haryana, 214 m average elevation
- Monuments of National Importance in Haryana
- State Protected Monuments in Haryana
- National Parks & Wildlife Sanctuaries of Haryana
- India cave temples
- Caves in India
- Rock-cut temples in India
- Indian rock-cut architecture
- Indus Valley Civilisation sites
- Highest point of Indian states and territories
- List of mountains in India
- Haryana Tourism
