= Dhosi Hill =

Indian volcano and historical site

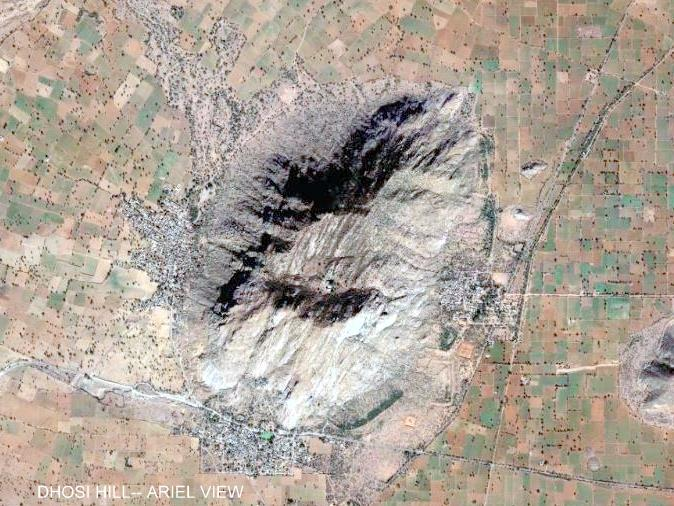
- Aerial view of Dhosi Hill showing ancient 'Parikrama'

Highest point
- Elevation: 740 m (2,430 ft)
- Coordinates: 28°03′40″N 76°01′55″E

Geography
- Location within Haryana Location within India
- Location: Mahendragarh district, Haryana, India
- Parent range: Aravali Range

Climbing
- Easiest route: Hike / scramble

Dhosi Hill is an extinct volcano that stands alone at the north-west end of the Aravalli mountain range in southern Haryana, India. It was an important site during the Vedic period. Its rises 345 to 470 meters from the surrounding land and 740 meters above sea level. Currently, the hill has temples, a pakka pond, ruins of a fort, caves and forest around it. In the ancient times, as per various scriptures like Mahabharata - Vanparv, Puranas, Shathpath Brahmana etc., the hill had Ashrams of various Rishis who made contributions to Vedic scriptures. The hill has all the physical features of a perfect volcanic hill, with a distinct lava crater still lying on it, giving it a perfect conical view from top.

It is among the most ancient Vedic religious sites in Haryana located on the route of oldest flow of Sarasvati River.

It is also known for the formulation of Chyvanprash for Chayvan Rishi by Rajya Vaids Ashvini Kumar twins for the first time. Chyavana Rishi and his father Bhrugu Rishi had their Ashrams on this hill.

== Location & transport ==
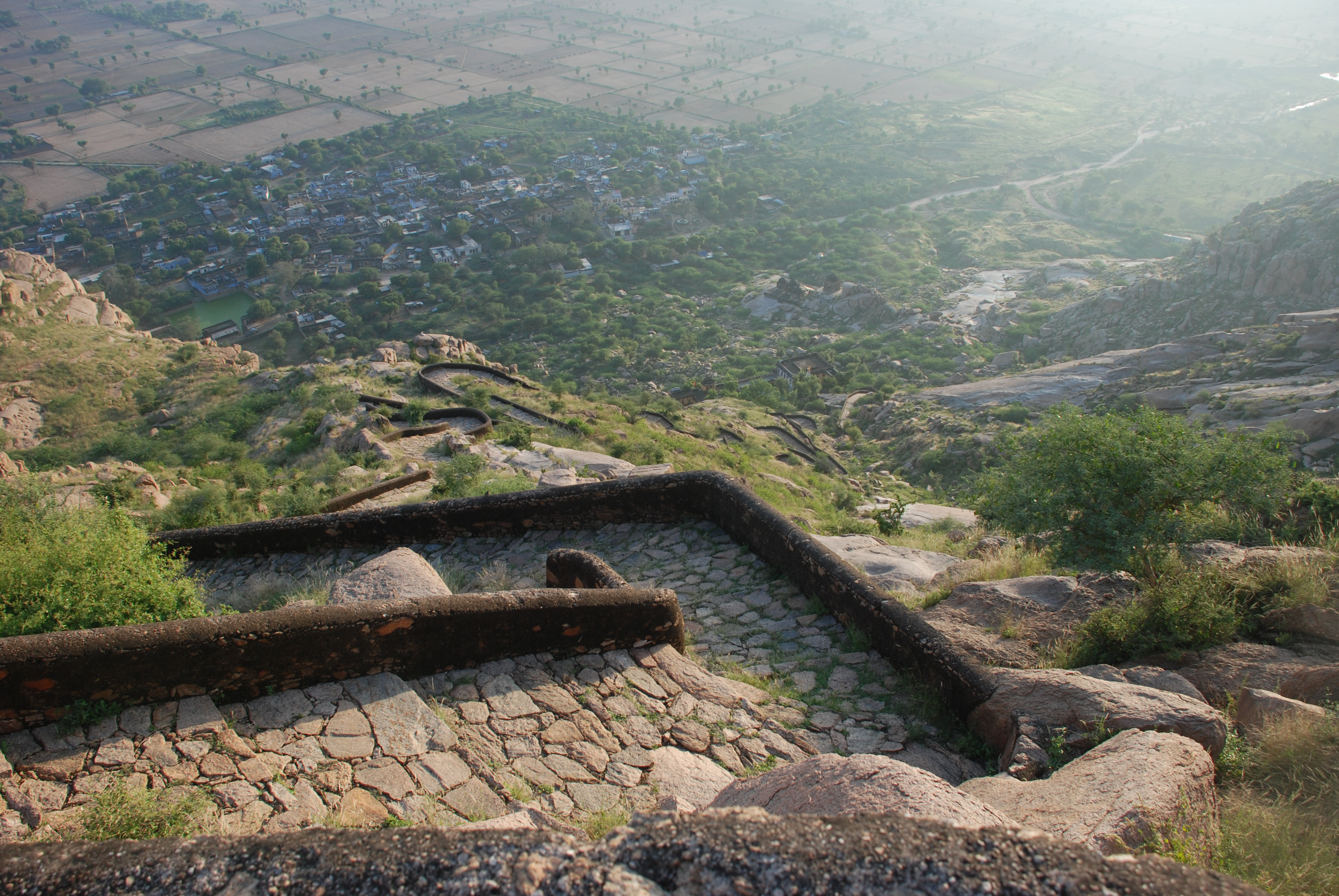
Serpentine stairs to Dhosi Hill Crater from Kultajpur side in Haryana.

Dhosi Hill is located on the border of the Indian states of Haryana and Rajasthan. It has 3 villages in its foothills; Dhosi village in the west in Jhunjhunu district of Rajasthan; Kultajpur in the south with ropeway & Thana village in the east - both in Mahendragarh district of Haryana. The Kultajpur village is 5 kilometres (3.1 mi) from the nearest major town Narnaul on Narnaul-Badopur Road. Narnaul has many highways converging there including NH-11, NH-148B, NH-152D Trans-Haryana Expressway, etc.

Kultajput lies on the foothill of Dhosi Hill and is 150 km west of Delhi, 100 km northwest from Alwar (which has the Delhi–Mumbai Expressway), and 160 km north of Jaipur.

While the ground level is about 900 feet (270 m) above sea level, the hilltop is another 900 feet (270 m) above the ground level.

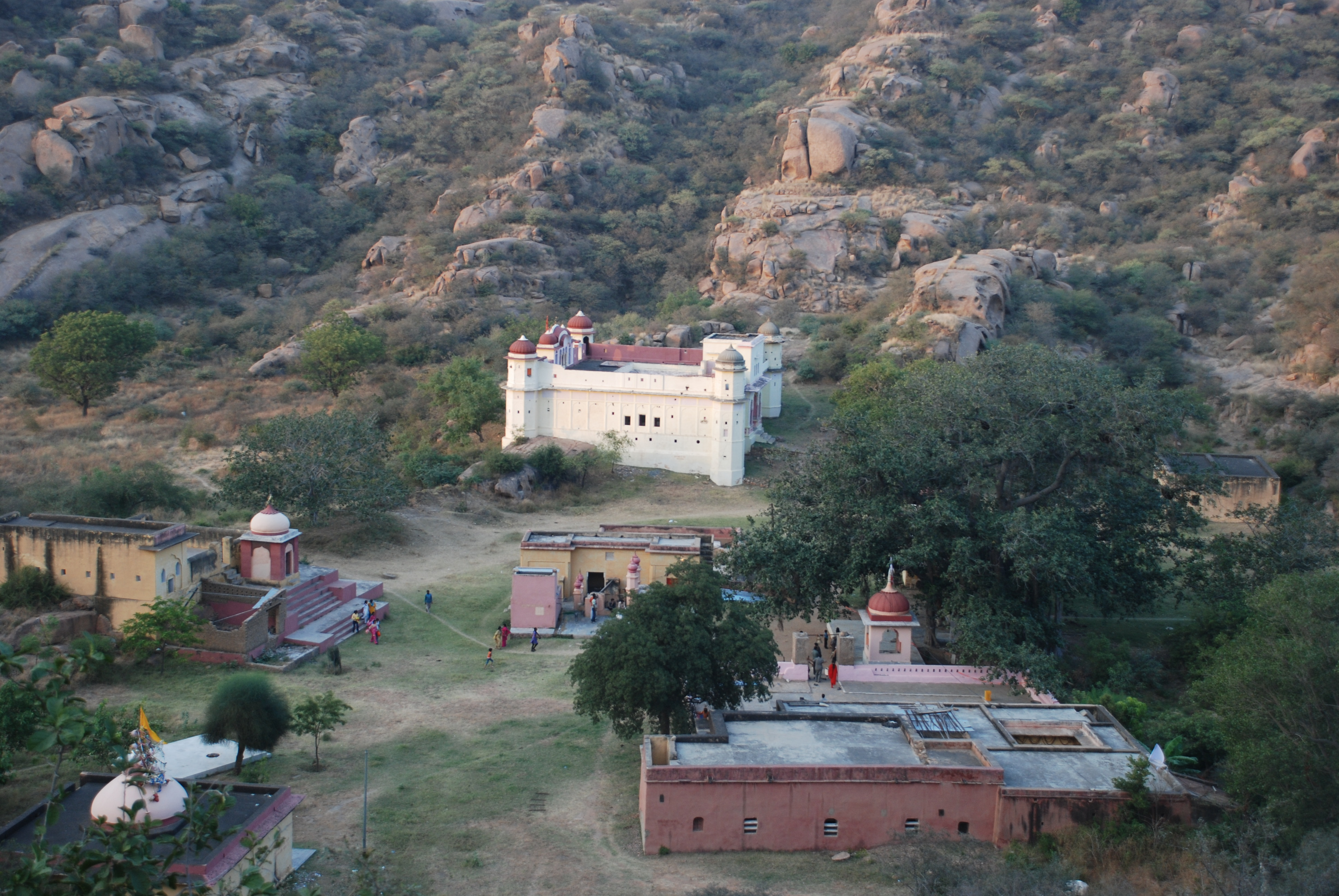
View of Dhosi Hill crater showing various structures.

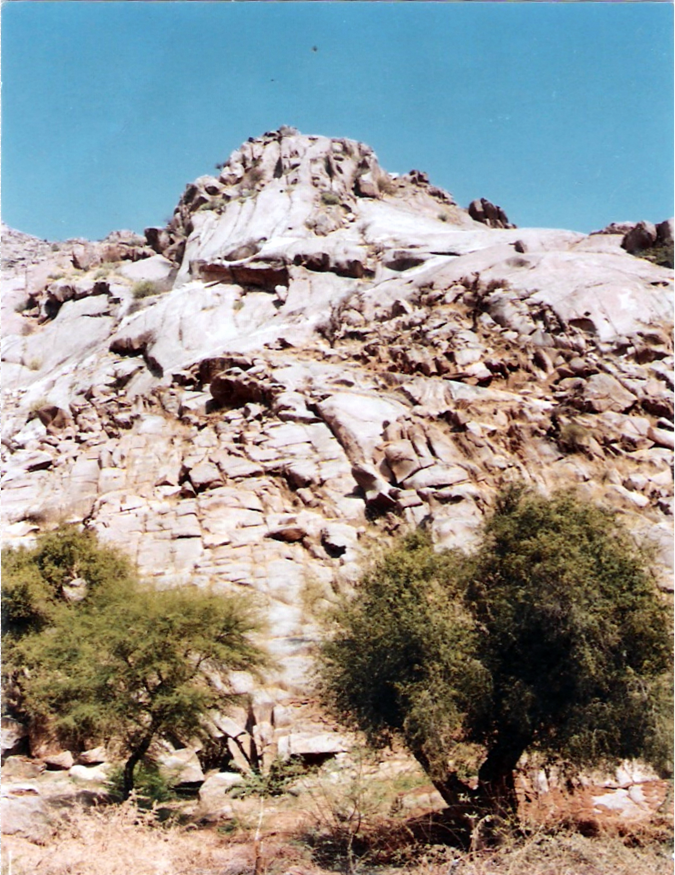
Lava or eruptions lying at Hill.

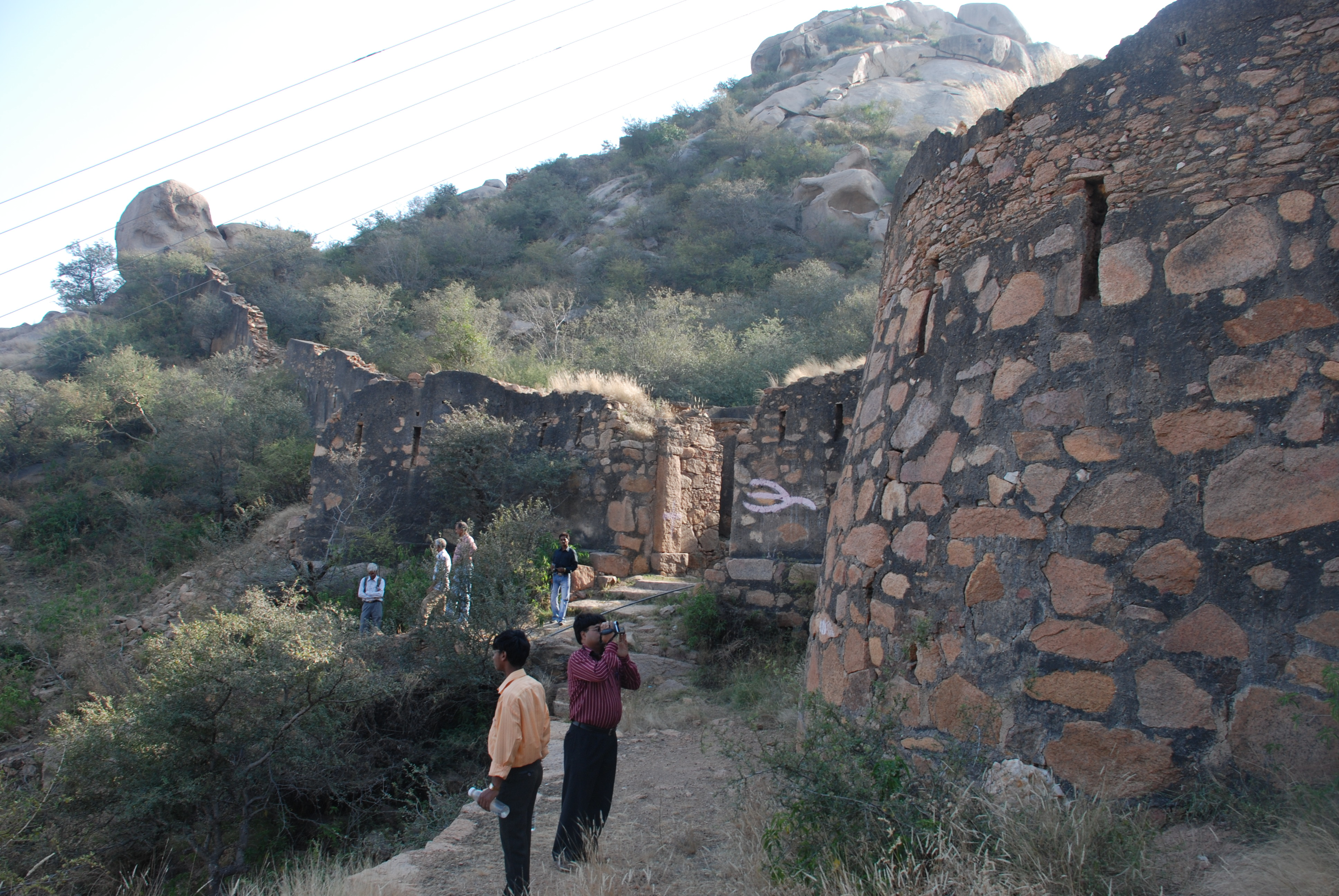
Remnants of a fort built during medieval period by Ganga Singh Nuniwal.

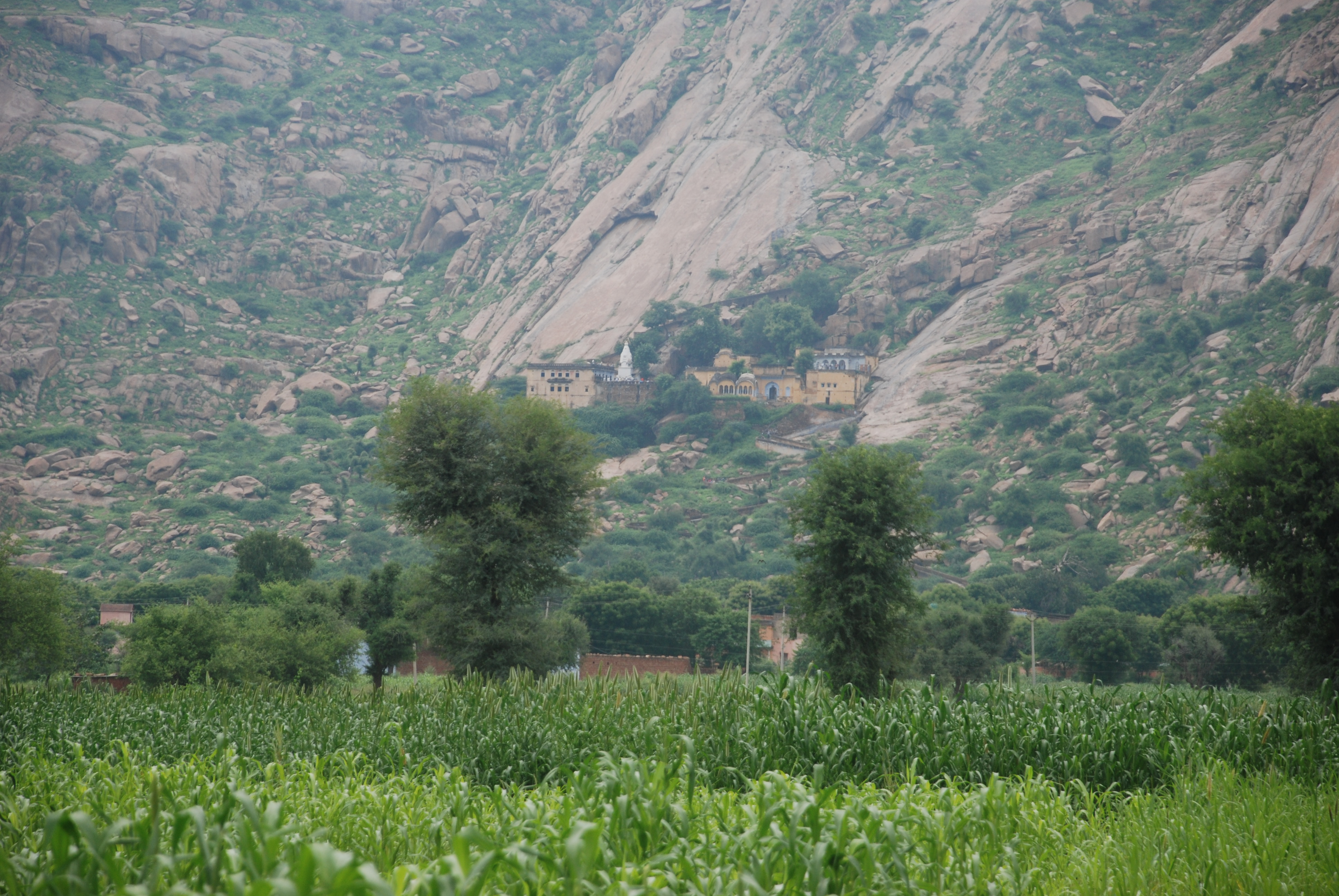
Base of Dhosi Hill.

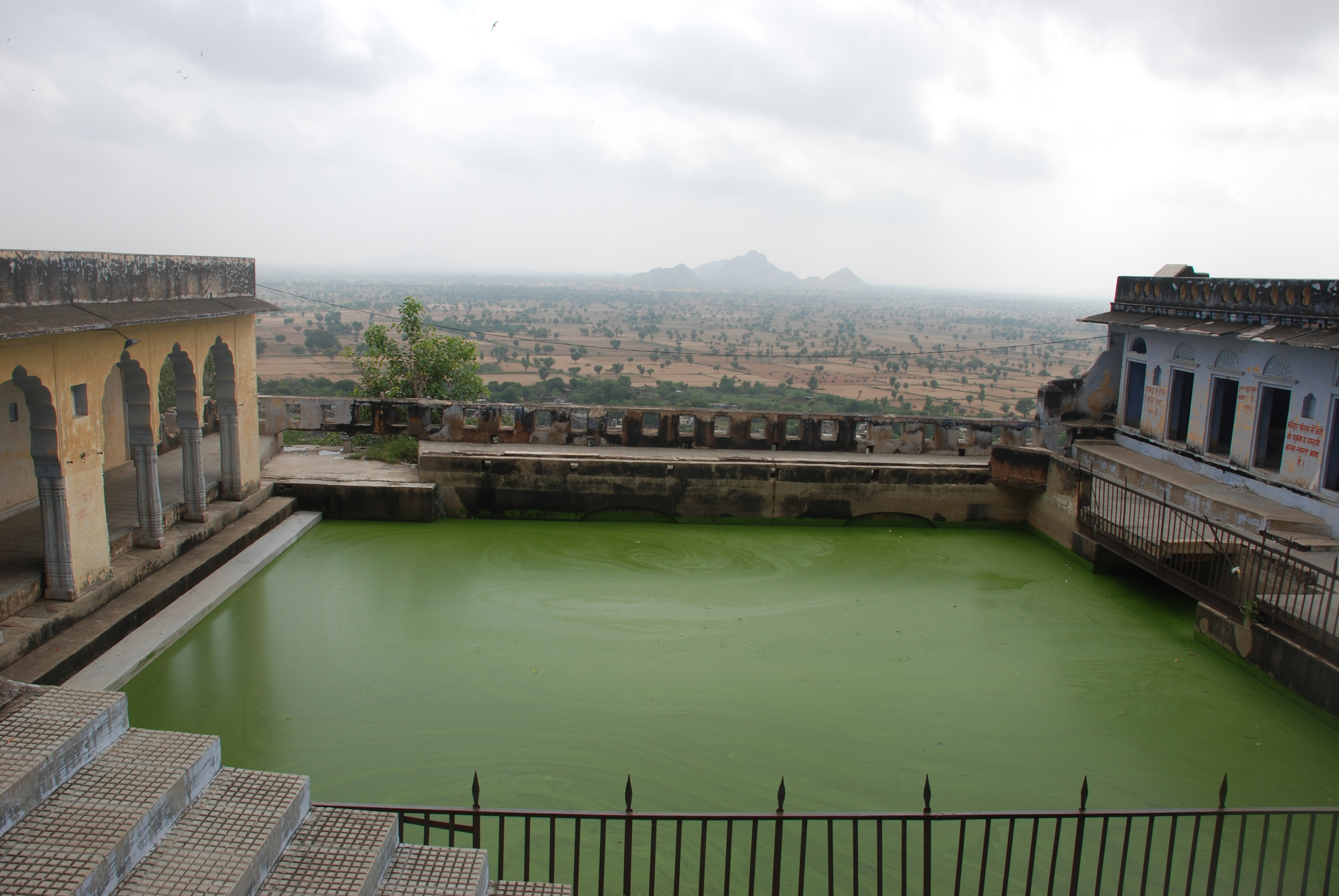
Shiv Kund' Sarovar at Dhosi Hill.

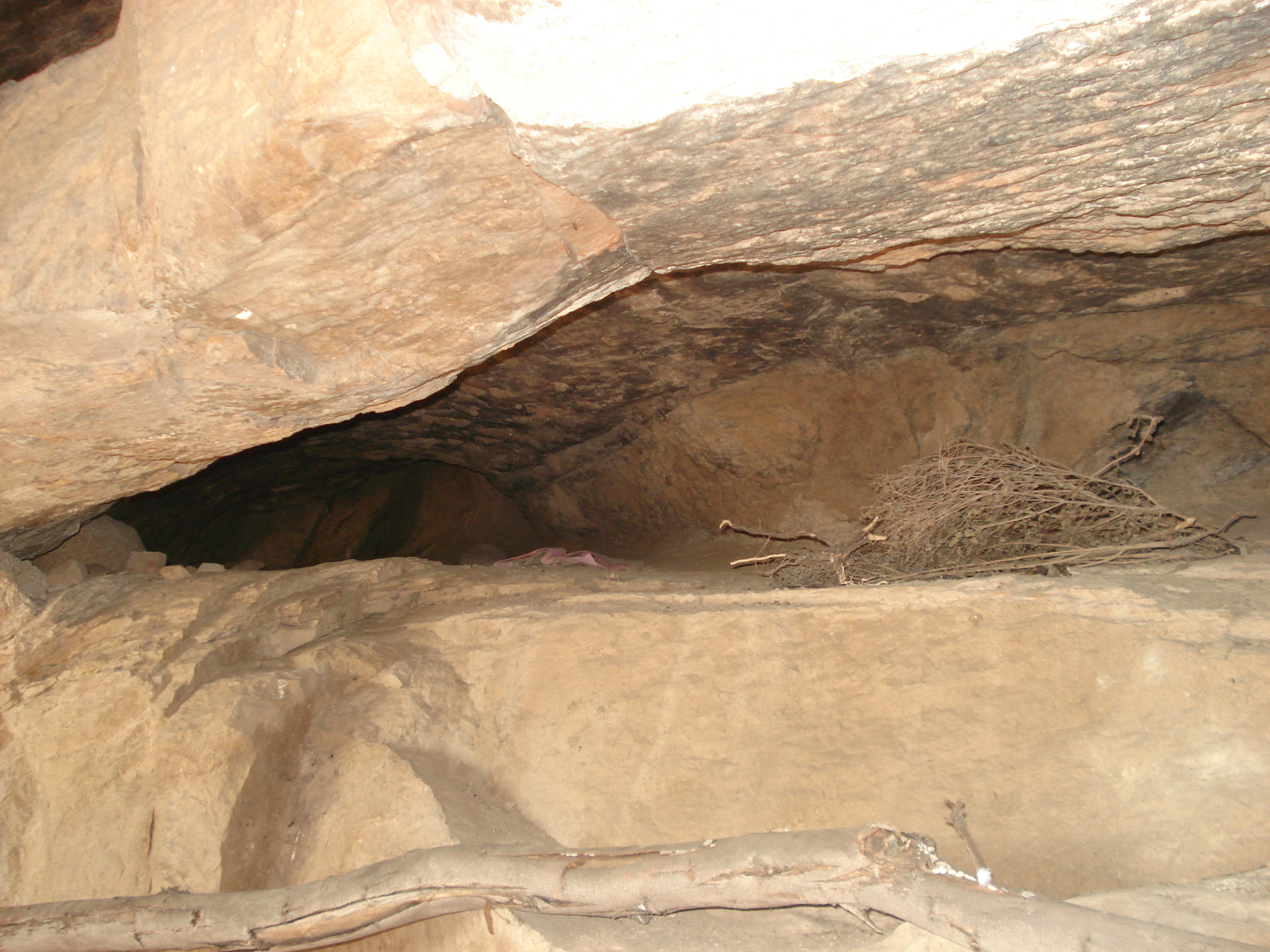
Cave on the route of parikrama, which provides shelter to pilgrims.

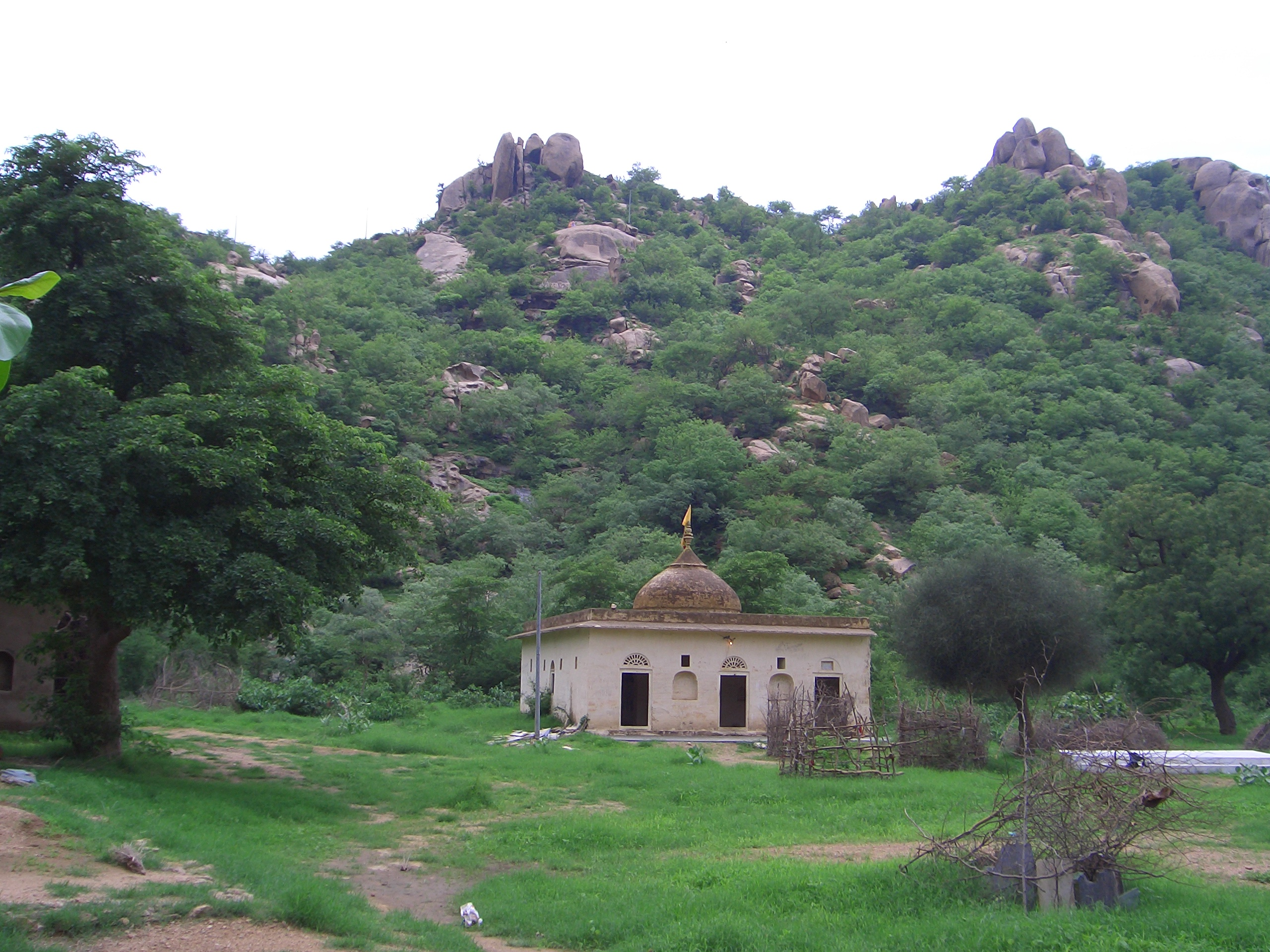
Ancient Shiva Temple on the levelled surface of the crater inside the hill.

== Aerial ropeway & glass bridge ==
Dhosi Hill Ropeway is a 900m long, INR45 cr, international standard ropeway built from the Haryana side to the top of the hill. It is constructed on a 50% each cost split share between the government of Haryana and the government of India. It was approved in June 2023, and construction will take 18 months after further approvals.

The Dhosi Hill Glass Bridge Skywalk is also planned.

== Importance ==
According to the Manusmriti, this hill is part of the Vedic state of 'Brahmavarta' the land between ancient Sarasvati River and Drishadvati River which was also called 'Devbhumi'. This being a volcanic hill had erupted on the banks of the Drishadvati, which had its origin in Aravalli mountains, from Lord Brahma's abode at Pushkar Lake near Ajmer. Even at present times, water from Jaipur district in Rajasthan flows in the ancient river Drishadwati river. According to research by 'Brahmavarta Research foundation', Rewari, the main Vedic scriptures like Manusmriti, Vedas and Upanishads were evolved and composed in this area called the Manu's state of Brahmavarta, where Rishis and Munis had their Ashrams. Lord Manu, Rishis like Bhrigu, Chyavana, Durvasa, Pippalada etc., who have contributed to various Sanskriti scriptures, had their Ashrams in the vicinity, 50 km radius of this hill.

== Administration & waterfalls ==
The hill presently falls under the administration of three village panchayats, being those of Dhosi in Jhunjhunu district of Rajasthan state and of Thana and Kultajpur in Mahendragarh district of Haryana state. These villages are situated on the three waterfalls that become active during the monsoons that occur in July–August, being created from the overflow of a reservoir at the summit. The waterfalls are mentioned in the epic Mahabharata. Each village also has an ancient water reservoir to augment the supply for villagers and animals.

== History & fort ==
During the early Vedic period of Rigveda, this area was called Brahmavart where rishi Chyavana lived in his ashram. During the later vedic period of Mahabharata, this area was called Nara which later became corrupted to Narnaul.

The fort has thick walls, up to 25 feet (7.6 m) high and 40 feet (12 m) wide on even the steepest slopes and the top of the volcano. The fort was constructed to safeguard the heritage and ashrams on the hill from frequent attacks by Muslim invaders during the medieval period. To replace the old temple, a fort modeled on the temple of Chyavana was built at the crater of the hill in the 1890s by the Bhargava community.

All-weather stairs in stone and lime plaster were constructed on the Kultajpur and Thana sides.

== Water sources ==
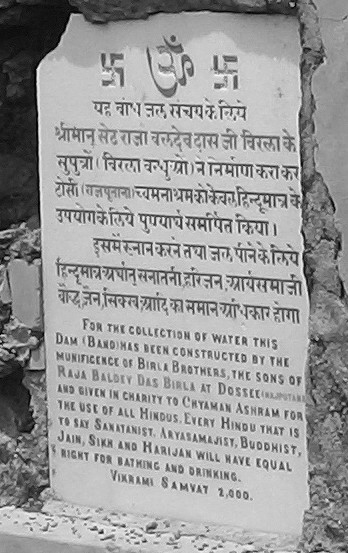
Plaque of Birla Brothers at the Dam Sarover on Dhosi Hill

A sarovar (reservoir) that stores rainwater for bathing of pilgrims has existed at the summit of the hill for centuries. The stored water is claimed to contain a few rejuvenating properties and treatment for skin ailments. The water in the reservoir becomes herbal and also cupric because of the quantity of copper in the hill and growth of rare herbs in large quantities.

The reservoir becomes silted over time and is desilted at regular intervals. In 1944, the industrialists Birla brothers, led by G. D. Birla, who hailed from the nearby Pilani village, arranged for the reservoir to be desilted and constructed a proper concrete dam on the site to increase the storage capacity. This was done in the memory of their father, Raja Baldev Rai Birla. A plaque is put on the Dam to this effect which states that reservoir could be used for bathing by all shades of Hindu pilgrims, including Sanatani, Harijan, Arya Samaji, Buddhists, Jains and Sikhs. This plaque shows that there was no caste barrier to use of the facilities.

In 2003, the reservoir was desilted by Indian National Trust for Art and Cultural Heritage, an NGO based in Delhi and Haryana.

A well for the supply of water for drinking and other purposes exists on the top of hill which is recharged by seepage and percolation of water from adjoining reservoirs which are charged by the rainwater on the hill. The Government of Haryana now provides drinking water at the hill through mechanical uplifting from the base of the hill.

== Parikrama ==
Those visiting the hill on pilgrimage perform a parikrama (circumambulation) of it since the time of Mahabharata and Guru Shaunaka of Pandavas. The 8–9 km parikrama track includes some portions which are damaged because of landslides. In the year 2022, Haryana CM Mr M L Khattar had donated INR 1 Cr each to three village Panchayats at the base of the hill to construct tourist infrastructure around the hill. Parikrama around the hill was made with concrete at most places, however, the whole Parikrama could not be completed because of paucity of funds.

== Temples and religious melas ==
Apart from temples at Shiv Kund, halfway to top of hill from Kultajpur side, there are several temples on the crater portion of the hill. Among these is the Chyavana temple, the Shiva temple on the crater, a Devi temple on the hilltop, and a Rama temple next to the Royal Guest House. The Chyavana temple has Shekhawati paintings in the Garbhagrah of the temple and a basement which can be used as a Dharmshala (resting place) for pilgrims. Among other structures on the hill is the renovated Chandrakoop.

Melas are organised at various festivals and other special days. On the day of Somvati Amavasya many people assemble for a holy bath in the sarovars. A map from the 1890s indicates there were then separate Ghats for women, known as Janana Ghats, but now they are abandoned.

== See also ==
- List of volcanoes in India
- Delhi Ridge
- Leopards of Haryana
- Karoh Peak, Panchkula district, highest point in Haryana, 1467 m peak
- Morni Hills, Panchkula district, 1267 m peak
- Tosham, 240 m average elevation
- Madhogarh, Haryana, 214 m average elevation
- Sacred mountains of India
- Monuments of National Importance in Haryana
- State Protected Monuments in Haryana
- National Parks & Wildlife Sanctuaries of Haryana
- India cave temples
- Caves in India
- Rock-cut temples in India
- Indian rock-cut architecture
- Chyavana Rishi
- Indus Valley Civilisation sites
- Highest point of Indian states and territories
- List of mountains in India
- Haryana Tourism
