= Arusha (disambiguation) =

Arusha is a city in northern Tanzania.

Arusha may also refer to:

- Arusha (ethnic group), an ethnic group in northern Tanzania
- Arusha Region, the region of Tanzania that is home to the Arusha people and the city of Arusha
- Arusha District, a district of Arusha Region, which includes the city of Arusha
- Arusha National Park, Tanzania
- Arusha Accords (disambiguation)
  - Arusha Declaration, a 1967 declaration calling for African socialism and other reforms
  - Arusha Agreement, a 1969 agreement with the European Communities
  - Arusha Accords (Rwanda), a 1993 set of accords intended to end the civil war in Rwanda
  - Arusha Accords (Burundi), a 2000 set of accords intended to end the civil war in Burundi

== See also ==
- Aarushi, an Indian female given name
- Arush Nand, Indian child actor
