= Karoi, Bhilwara =

Karoi
- village
- Interactive map of Karoi
- Country: India
- State: Rajasthan

Government
  - Body: Gram panchayat

Languages
  - Official: Hindi
- Time zone: UTC+5:30 (IST)

Karoi is a village in the Bhilwara district of Rajasthan, India.widely celebrated as the Village of Fortune Tellers or Jyotish Nagari .

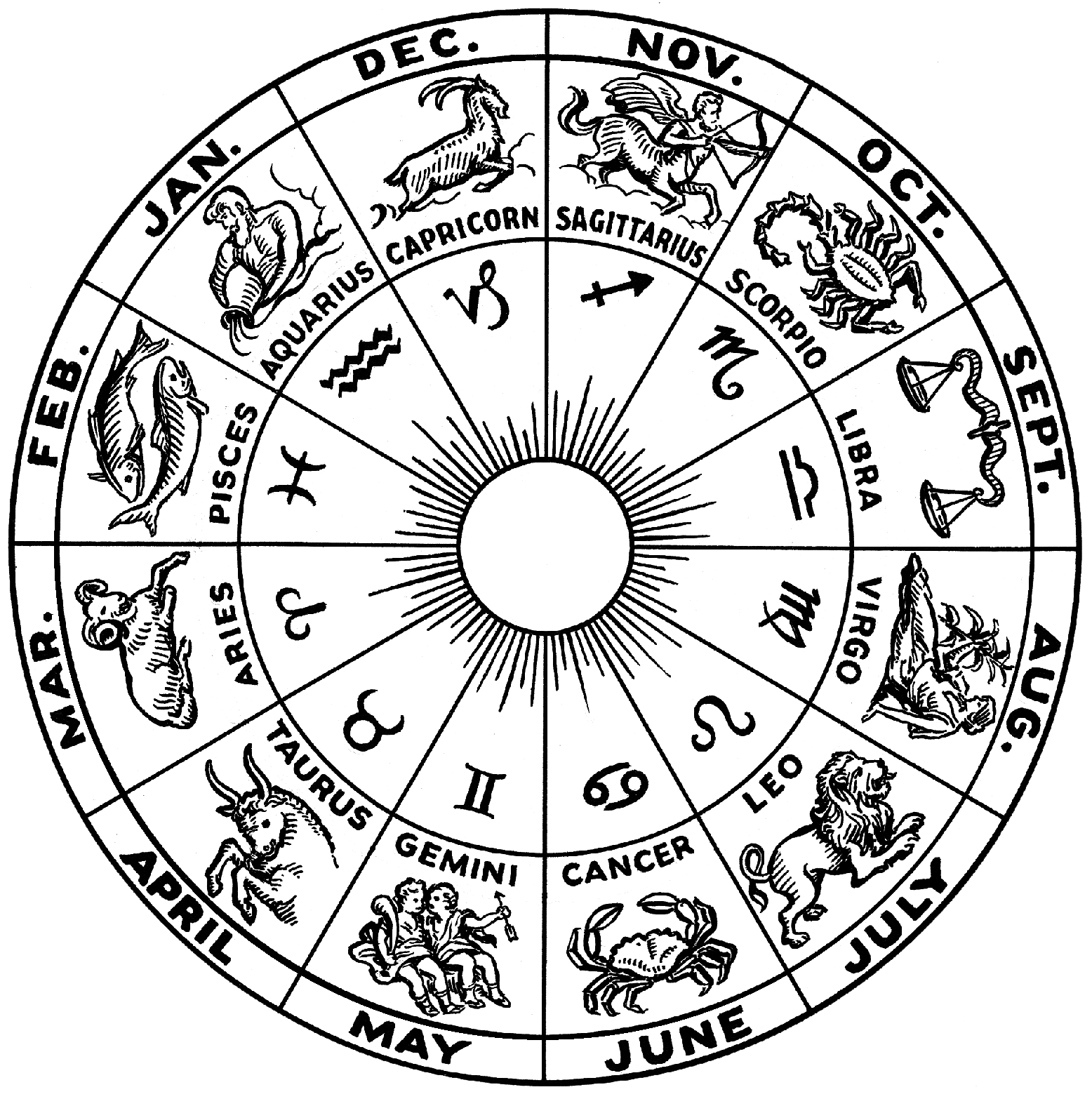
Astrological symbols

== Early History ==
Astrology in Every Household, Almost every household in Karoi practices astrology, passing down the ancient wisdom of Bhrigu Samhita and mathematical planetary charts across generations.

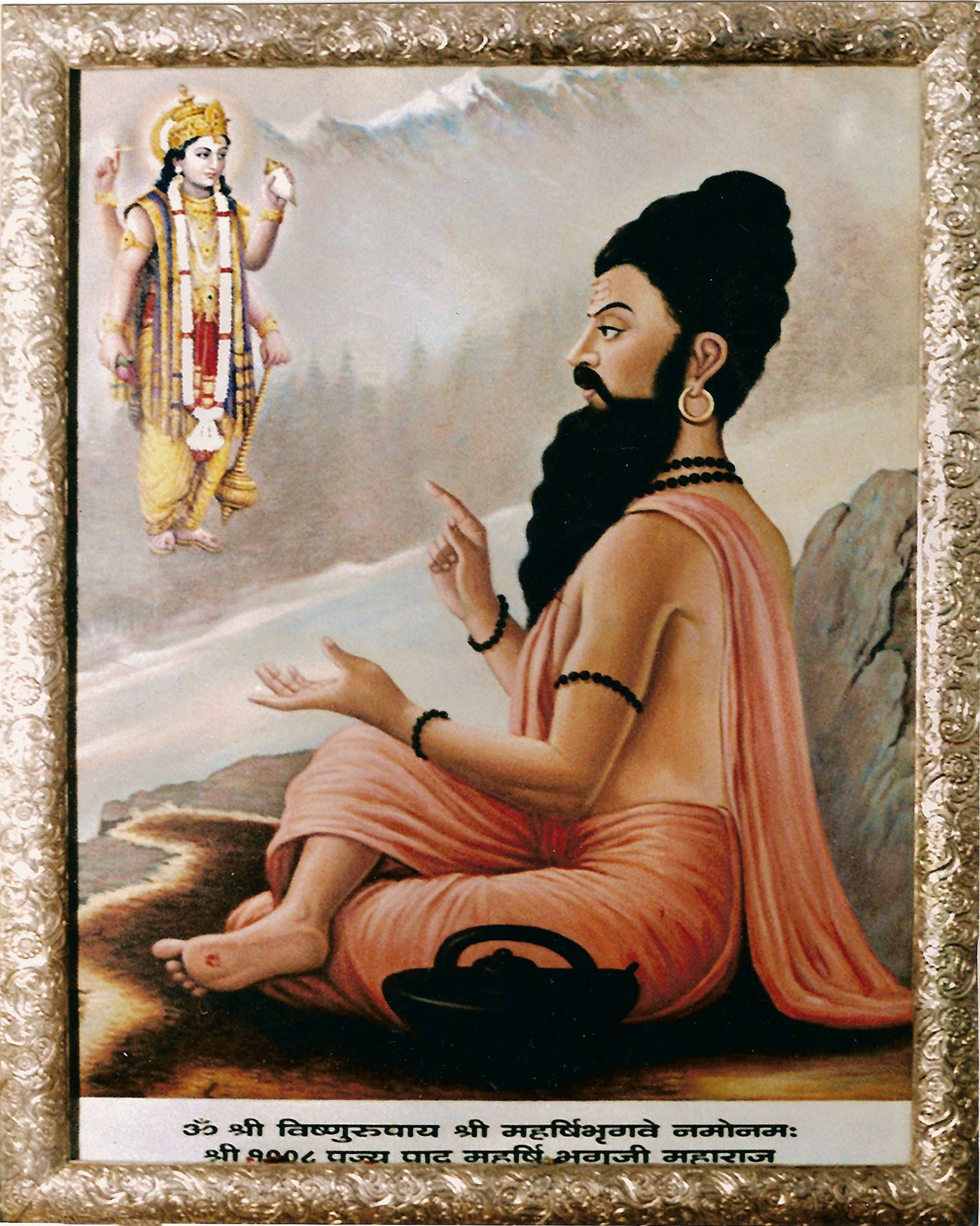
Bhrigu as per the Bhrigu Stotram

== VVIP movement ==
Karoi village frequently hosts legendary Indian figures who come to consult the local pandits, including former President Pratibha Patil, union ministers like Smriti Irani, and senior state leadership.
