= Bhrigu Samhita =

Hindu astrological text

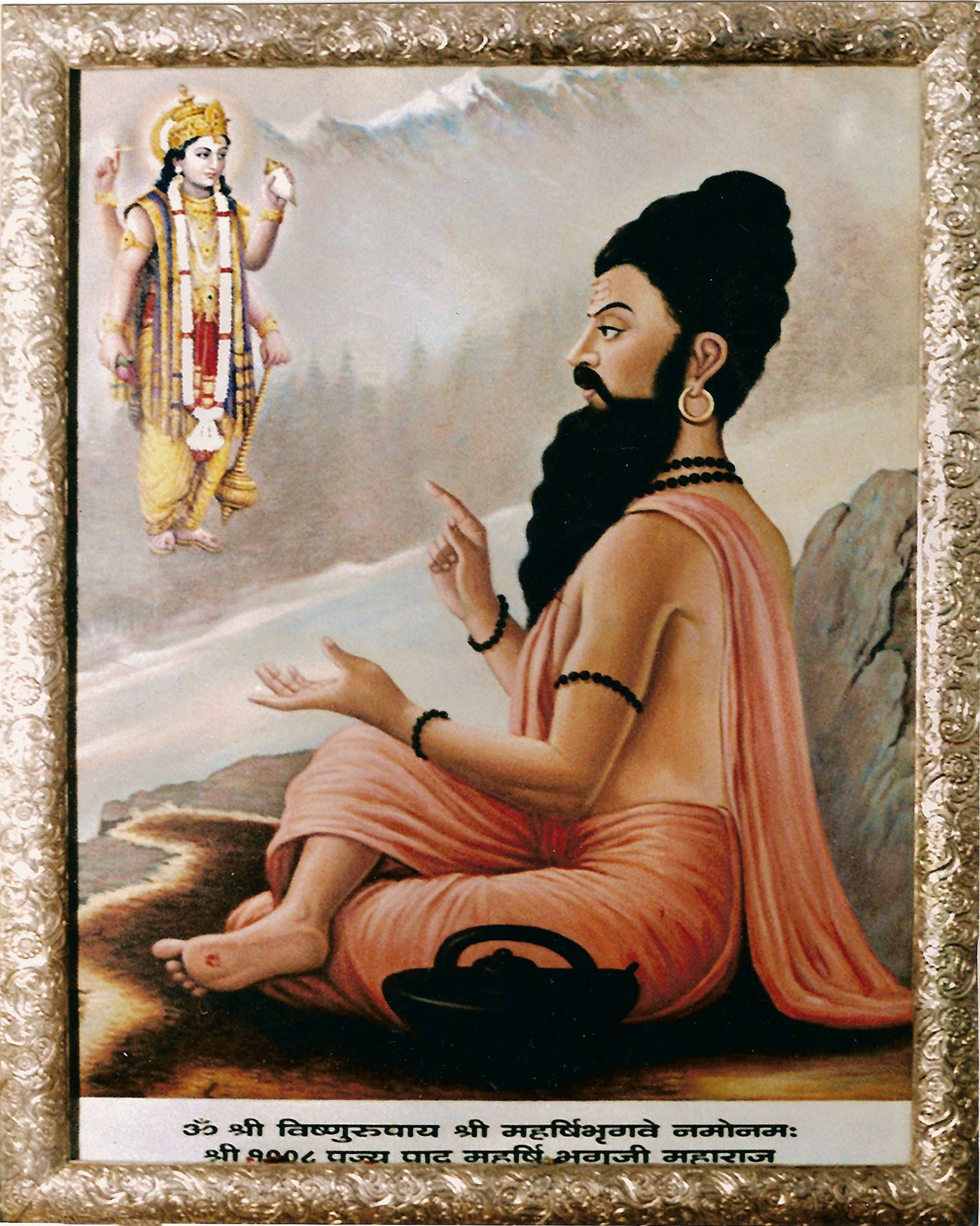
Bhrigu as per the Bhrigu Stotram

The Bhṛgu Saṃhitā is a Saṃskṛta astrological(Jyotisha) treatise attributed in its introduction to Bhrigu, one of the "Saptarshis" ("seven sages") of the Vedic period. Its introductory chapter states that it was compiled by the saptarshi uttaradhikari out of compassion for humanity so that humanity could cope with the pressures of its existence and move towards a more spiritual nature. The Bhrigu Samhita claims to contain predictions about current and future lives as well as information about past lives.

== Origin ==
Bhrigu's ashram 'Deepostak' was located near Dhosi Hill in present-day Haryana-Rajasthan border in India. Major parts of the Bhṛgu Saṃhitā were lost or destroyed.

Bhrigu was the first compiler of predictive astrology. He compiled an estimated 500,000 horoscopes and recorded the life details and events of various people. This formed a database for further research and study, which culminated in the birth of the art of determining the quality of time (Horā) and is the Bṛhat Parāśara Horāśāstra. These Horoscopes were based upon the planetary positions of the Sun, Moon, Mercury, Venus, Mars, Jupiter, Saturn, Rāhu (North Node of the Moon) and Ketu (South Node of the Moon).

Bhṛigu gives his predictions on the different types of horoscopes compiled by him (claimed to be with the help of Gaṇeśa) in a brief and concise manner. The total number of permutations/possible horoscope charts that can be drawn with this is about 45 million. Bhrigu taught this art of predictions to his son (Śukra) and other pupils. Currently a part of Bhrigu Samhita is claimed to be available in Hoshiarpur District of modern-day Punjab and Varanasi district of modern-day Uttar Pradesh.
