= Doli Gutta =

Mountain in India

- Location within Telangana

Highest point
- Elevation: 965 m (3,166 ft)
- Listing: List of Indian states and territories by highest point
- Coordinates: 18°20′31″N 80°44′29″E

Geography
- Location: Mulugu district, Telangana, India / Bijapur district, Chhattisgarh, India
- Parent range: Deccan Plateau

Climbing
- Easiest route: Hike / scramble

Doli Gutta is a peak in the northern part of the Deccan Plateau. It is located at the border of Mulugu district in Telangana and Bijapur district in Chhattisgarh, India.

== Highest point in Telangana ==
At 965 m Doli Gutta is the highest peak in the state of Telangana since the Chintoor and Vararamachandrapuram mandals of erstwhile Khammam district — where Pedda Konda rose to a height of 1360 m— were transferred to Andhra Pradesh. On 11 July 2014, the Lok Sabha approved a bill transferring seven mandals of Khammam district (Kukunoor, Velairpadu, Bhurgampadu, Chintoor, Kunavaram, Vararamachandrapuram and Bhadrachalam) back to Andhra Pradesh, in order to facilitate the Polavaram Irrigation project. Bhadrachalam town was given to Telangana during the division. Originally, a part of Madras presidency, these regions were added to Khammam district of erstwhile Andhra Pradesh for convenience and later divided between Telangana and Andhra Pradesh

== See also ==
- Geography of Telangana
- List of mountains in India
- List of mountains by elevation
