= Puloma =

Wife of Bhrigu in Hinduism

- Texts: Mahabharata, Puranas

Genealogy
- Spouse: Bhrigu
- Children: Chyavana

Puloma (Sanskrit: पुलोमा, romanized: Pulomā) is the wife of Sage Bhrigu in Hinduism. She is the mother of the sage Chyavana.

== Legend ==
=== Mahabharata ===
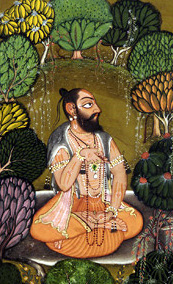
Chyavana, the son of Bhrigu and Puloma

In the Mahabharata, as narrated by the bard Sauti, Puloma was the wife of sage Bhrigu. The couple were once staying in a hermitage. She became pregnant. One day, Bhrigu went for his morning ablutions in the river, leaving his wife in the hermitage at the care of Agni. During this time, a rakshasa by the name of Puloman, who had earlier loved Puloma, and had been betrothed to her, came to the hermitage. He saw Puloma and he was besotted by her beauty. Puloma, as a virtuous wife of Brighu and a host, treated him like a guest and offered him refreshments, in spite of his lustful glaring at her. Puloman intended to abduct and marry her. He then saw Agni, the flames of the sacrificial fire, burning in a chamber in the hermitage. Puloman then asked Agni to tell him truthfully the status of Puloma whom he had accepted as his spiritual wife. But Agni was reluctant to reveal the truth as he was scared that Bhrigu would curse him if he told the truth. But on Puloman's insistence, Agni told him the truth that Brighu had married Puloma as per Vedic rites in his presence, as she had only been betrothed to him (rakshasa) and not formally married to her. Hearing this, Puloman changed his form to a boar and abducted Puloma.

Frightened by this development, Puloma gave birth to her son, who fell on the ground. This son was named Chyavana, meaning, "fallen from the womb". The child shone like the Sun. Looking at the baby, Puloman was scorched to death, leaving behind Puloma and her son. In another version, it is said that he was terrified by looking at the child, and ran away dropping Puloma on the ground. Puloma, overcome by her plight, cried intensely to the extent that the tears she shed created a river called Vadhusaras. which later became the location of the hermitage of her son Chyavana when he had become a sage. Brahma consoled her.

Puloma then came to her hermitage and appraised Bhrigu of the events that had happened with her and her son. While Bhrigu was happy to see his son, he was enraged to know from Puloma that it was Agni who had revealed her true identity as Bhrigu's wife to Puloman who was now dead, turned into ashes by their son's brightness. In a fit of rage he cursed Agni, saying, "Thou shalt eat of all things", meaning to become "omnivorous" or “May you be consumer of all things on this Earth". Agni also became furious to hear this curse, and told Bhrigu that his curse was not just, as he only spoken the truth. Agni said that he was omnipresent, and through his mouth both the gods and the ancestors (pitrus) accept the clean oblations of clarified butter offered to him, and hence any offering of unclean things to him would be improper.

He also told Bhrigu that he could also curse him, but he refrained from doing so as the latter was a sage and a Brahmin. With these words, Agni went incognito. Brahma then summoned Agni to his presence and recounted Agni's role in the universe and told him that the curse stands modified, as his flames would only consume everything offered to him, but his physical body would remain pure. Agni reappeared in the universe to perform his natural duties.

=== Padma Purana ===
In another version in Padma Purana (pa 14), it is said that when Bhrigu was searching for samidhas (firewood) for offering to Agni, the demon Damana went to Bhrigu's hermitage, looking for the sage's wife. Agni, seeing Damana, became frightened and disclosed Puloma's hideout in the hermitage. When Bhrigu came back and came to know of Agni's action, he cursed him, but later agreed to reduce its effect to some extent.
