= Sukanya =

Princess in Hindu mythology

In-universe information
- Family: Vaivasvata Manu (grandfather); Sharyati (father) Srishtika(mother) Arnata(brother)
- Spouse: Chyavana

Sukanya (Sanskrit: सुकन्या, romanized: Sukanyā, lit. 'wonderful virgin') is a princess in Hindu mythology. She is the daughter of Sharyati, the son of Vaivasvata Manu, and the wife of the sage Chyavana.

== Legend ==
=== Marriage ===
According to the narrative found in the Vana Parva of the Mahabharata, Sage Chyavana was so absorbed in practising austerities on the side of a lake that termites built up their mound all over his body and only his eyes were left. Once, Sharyati, along with his army and household, came to visit the place. Sukanya, daughter of King Sharyati, seeing only two bright eyes in what seemed to be an anthill, poked them with a stick. Chyavana felt excessive pain and became furious. He obstructed the excretory functions of the men of Sharyati's army. He was appeased only after the king gave him his daughter, Sukanya, in marriage.

=== Deduction ===
Once, the Ashvins visited the hermitage of Chyavana. They saw the beautiful Sukanya while she was bathing. They tried to convince Sukanya to reject the old and ugly Chyavana, and accept one of them as her husband. Furious, the princess rejected their proposal. The deities then promised to restore the youth and eyesight of Chyavana first, so that she could make an unbiased choice amongst her present husband, and one of them. The princess was tempted, because this would mean that her husband's vigour would be restored. Sukanya promised to consider their proposal, and informed Chyavana. At the behest of Chyavana, Sukanya requested the Ashvins to allow her to make her choice. All three took a bath in the lake, and came out with the same youthful, divine look. Each of them requested Sukanya to be his bride, but she successfully identified Chyavana and selected him, in some accounts, after praying to Adi Parashakti. Sukanya succeeded in identifying Chyavana by observing the eyes of all the three of them; Devas don't blink and thus she picked the person who blinked. In gratitude for his restored youth and eyesight, Chyavana assured the Ashvins that he would ensure that the deities would get their share of the sacrificial offerings.

According to the Mahabharata, Sukanya bore her husband a son called Pramati.

== See also ==
- Mada
- Ahalya
- Rukmini
