= Aarushi =

Arushi or Aarushi may refer to:

- Arushi, wife of the legendary sage Chyavana
- Arushi Sharma (born 1995), Indian actress
- Aarushi Sharma (active from 2015), Indian actress and beauty queen
- Aarushi Talwar (1994–2008), victim in the 2008 Noida double murder case
