= List of Indian states and union territories by elevation =

This list includes the topographic elevations of each of the 28 states 8 union territories of India.

The elevation of a geographic area may be stated in several ways. These include:

1. The maximum elevation of the area (high point); (Note: A high point may be (1.) a topographic summit, or (2.) a point on a border.)
2. The minimum elevation of the area (low point); (Note: A low point may be (1.) the border crossing of a gulch, stream, or river; or (2.) the shore of a reservoir, lake, or ocean; or (3.) the bottom of an endorheic basin. The elevation of a stream, river, reservoir, or lake will vary seasonally. The bottom of an endorheic basin may fill with water.)
3. The arithmetic mean elevation of the area (statistical mean elevation); (Note: The mean elevation of an area is the arithmetic average of all point elevations in the area.)
4. The median elevation of the area (statistical 50% elevation); (Note: The median elevation of an area is the median of all point elevations in the area.) and
5. The elevation range of the area. (Note: The elevation range of an area is the maximum elevation minus the minimum elevation.)

== Elevations ==
Elevations of states and union territories of India
State or union territory	Highest point, rank & elevation			Region	Notes	Lowest point, rank & elevation			Elevation: rank, mean; rank, range				High point coordinates
Andaman and Nicobar Islands	Saddle Peak	31	732 metres (2,402 ft)	North Andaman Island		Andaman Sea and Bay of Bengal	2	Sea level	22	300 metres (980 ft)	27	732 metres (2,402 ft)	13.1586°N 93.0058°E
Andhra Pradesh	Arma Konda	17	1,680 metres (5,510 ft)	Eastern Ghats	Arma Konda is the highest peak in the Eastern Ghats.	Bay of Bengal	2	Sea level	20	400 metres (1,300 ft)	13	1,680 metres (5,510 ft)	18.228°N 82.723°E
Arunachal Pradesh	Kangto	5	7,090 metres (23,260 ft)	Eastern Himalayas	Kangto lies on the Line of Actual Control between India and China.	Brahmaputra River at Assam border	18	44 metres (144 ft)	6	2,000 metres (6,600 ft)	3	7,046 metres (23,117 ft)	27.515°N 92.315°E
Assam	Unnamed peak	14	1,960 metres (6,430 ft)	Cachar Hills section of the Karbi Anglong Plateau	Located in Dima Hasao District. It is the highest peak in the Karbi Anglong Plateau.	Brahmaputra River at Bangladesh–India border	19	45 metres (148 ft)	32	150 metres (490 ft)	11	1,915 metres (6,283 ft)	25.32135°N 93.4529°E
Bihar	Someshwar Fort	30	880 metres (2,890 ft)	Sivalik Hills		Ganges River at West Bengal border	14	11 metres (36 ft)	33	100 metres (330 ft)	26	869 metres (2,851 ft)	27.3876°N 84.3055°E
Chandigarh	Unnamed point near Khuda Ali Sher Village	32	479 metres (1,572 ft)	Sivalik Hills	Located on the border between Punjab and Chandigarh.	Unnamed point	N/A		21	320 metres (1,050 ft)	N/A		30.7724°N 76.8204°E
Chhattisgarh	Nandiraj	23	1,276 metres (4,186 ft)	Bailadila Range section of the Deccan Plateau	Located in Dantewada District. Nandiraj is the highest peak in the Bailadila Range.	Sabari River at Andhra Pradesh border	17	35 metres (115 ft)	12	600 metres (2,000 ft)	19	1,241 metres (4,072 ft)	18.6646°N 81.2258°E
Dadra and Nagar Haveli and Daman and Diu	Unnamed point near Bedpa Village	33	465 metres (1,526 ft)	Western Ghats	Located in Dadra and Nagar Haveli District on the border between Dadra and Nagar Haveli and Daman and Diu and Maharashtra.	Arabian Sea	2	Sea level	34	50 metres (160 ft)	28	465 metres (1,526 ft)	20.0802°N 73.2057°E
Delhi	Deheri	34	315 metres (1,033 ft)	Delhi Ridge section of the Aravalli Range	Located in South Delhi District on the border between Delhi and Haryana.	Yamuna River at Uttar Pradesh border	N/A		28	220 metres (720 ft)	N/A		28.4108°N 77.2037°E
Goa	Sonsogor	25	1,026 metres (3,366 ft)	Western Ghats	Sonsogor lies on the inter-state border between Goa and Karnataka.	Arabian Sea	2	Sea level	22	300 metres (980 ft)	21	1,026 metres (3,366 ft)	15.5232°N 74.2795°E
Gujarat	Girnar	24	1,145 metres (3,757 ft)	Girnar Hills	Girnar is the highest peak in the Girnar Hills.	Arabian Sea	2	Sea level	29	200 metres (660 ft)	20	1,115 metres (3,658 ft)	21.528°N 70.527°E
Haryana	Karoh Peak	20	1,467 metres (4,813 ft)	Morni Hills section of the Sivalik Hills	Karoh Peak is the highest peak in the Morni Hills.	Yamuna River at Uttar Pradesh border	25	169 metres (554 ft)	27	250 metres (820 ft)	17	1,398 metres (4,587 ft)	30.7437°N 77.0769°E
Himachal Pradesh	Reo Purgyil	6	6,816 metres (22,362 ft)	Western Himalayas	Reo Purgyil lies on the Line of Actual Control between India and China.	Beas River at Punjab border	27	232 metres (761 ft)	2	3,000 metres (9,800 ft)	5	6,584 metres (21,601 ft)	31.884°N 78.735°E
Jammu and Kashmir	Nun Peak	4	7,135 metres (23,409 ft)	Western Himalayas		Chenab River at India–Pakistan border	28	247 metres (810 ft)	5	2,300 metres (7,500 ft)	4	6,888 metres (22,598 ft)	33.9809°N 76.0205°E
Jharkhand	Parasnath	21	1,365 metres (4,478 ft)	Chota Nagpur Plateau	Parasnath is the highest peak in the Chota Nagpur Plateau.	Ganges River at West Bengal border	N/A		11	700 metres (2,300 ft)	N/A		23.9634°N 86.129°E
Karnataka	Mullayyanagiri	15	1,925 metres (6,316 ft)	Sahyadri Range section of the Western Ghats	Mullayyanagiri is the highest peak in the Sahyadri Range.	Laccadive Sea	2	Sea level	12	600 metres (2,000 ft)	10	1,925 metres (6,316 ft)	13.391°N 75.721°E
Kerala	Anamudi	10	2,695 metres (8,842 ft)	Anaimalai Hills section of the Western Ghats	Anamudi is the highest mountain peak in the Western Ghats and highest in India outside the Himalayas. It is the highest peak in the Anaimalai Hills.	Kuttanad	1	−2.7 metres (−8.9 ft)	16	500 metres (1,600 ft)	8	2,697.7 metres (8,851 ft)	10.170°N 77.061°E
Ladakh	Saltoro Kangri	3	7,742 metres (25,400 ft)	Saltoro Mountains section of Karakoram	Saltoro Kangri lies on the Actual Ground Position Line between India and Pakistan on the Siachen Glacier. It is the highest peak in the Saltoro Mountains. The highest peak claimed by India as part of Ladakh is K2 which has the elevation of 8,611 m (28,251 ft). K2 is located in the Pakistan-administered territory of Gilgit-Baltistan.	Indus River at India–Pakistan Line of Control	30	2,550 metres (8,370 ft)	1	4,200 metres (13,800 ft)	6	5,192 metres (17,034 ft)	35.399°N 76.849°E
Lakshadweep	Unnamed point	36	15 metres (49 ft)	Agatti Island		Arabian Sea and Laccadive Sea	2	Sea level	36	2 metres (6 ft 7 in)	30	15 metres (49 ft)	
Madhya Pradesh	Dhupgarh	22	1,352 metres (4,436 ft)	Satpura Range	Dhupgarh is the highest peak in the Satpura Range.	Tamsa River at Uttar Pradesh border	21	92 metres (302 ft)	15	550 metres (1,800 ft)	18	1,260 metres (4,130 ft)	22.449°N 78.371°E
Maharashtra	Kalsubai	19	1,646 metres (5,400 ft)	Sahyadri Range section of the Western Ghats		Arabian Sea	2	Sea level	12	600 metres (2,000 ft)	15	1,646 metres (5,400 ft)	19.6003°N 73.711°E
Manipur	Mount Tempü	9	2,994 metres (9,823 ft)	Barail Range section of the Patkai Range	Mount Tempü lies on the inter-state border between Nagaland and Manipur.	Barak River at Assam border	N/A		9	900 metres (3,000 ft)	N/A		25.531°N 94.085°E
Meghalaya	Shillong Peak	13	1,965 metres (6,447 ft)	Khasi Hills section of the Shillong Plateau	Located in East Khasi Hills District. Shillong Peak is the highest peak in the Shillong Plateau.	Brahmaputra River at Assam border	24	150 metres (490 ft)	8	1,000 metres (3,300 ft)	12	1,815 metres (5,955 ft)	25.5316°N 91.8512°E
Mizoram	Phawngpui	12	2,157 metres (7,077 ft)	Lushai Hills section of the Patkai Range	Phawngpui is also known as Blue Mountain. It is the highest mountain peak in the Lushai Hills.	Longai River at Assam border	N/A		10	850 metres (2,790 ft)	N/A		22.6315°N 93.0388°E
Nagaland	Mount Saramati	7	3,826 metres (12,552 ft)	Naga Hills section of the Patkai Range	Mount Saramati lies on the India–Myanmar border. It is the highest peak in the Patkai Range.	Dhansiri River at Assam border	N/A		7	1,200 metres (3,900 ft)	N/A		25.742°N 95.033°E
Odisha	Deomali	18	1,672 metres (5,486 ft)	Eastern Ghats		Bay of Bengal	2	Sea level	22	300 metres (980 ft)	14	1,672 metres (5,486 ft)	18.675°N 82.982°E
Puducherry	Unnamed point near Chalakara Village	35	67 metres (220 ft)	West Coast Hillocks	Located in Mahé District on the border between Puducherry and Kerala.	Bay of Bengal and Laccadive Sea	2	Sea level	35	15 metres (49 ft)	29	67 metres (220 ft)	11.7183°N 75.5317°E
Punjab	Unnamed peak	25	1,000 metres (3,300 ft)	Naina Devi Range section of the Sivalik Hills	Located in Rupnagar District.	Sutlej River at India–Pakistan border	23	105 metres (344 ft)	22	300 metres (980 ft)	24	895 metres (2,936 ft)	31.259°N 76.601°E
Rajasthan	Guru Shikhar	16	1,722 metres (5,650 ft)	Aravalli Range	Guru Shikhar is the highest peak in the Aravalli Range.	Luni River at Gujarat border	22	100 metres (330 ft)	19	450 metres (1,480 ft)	16	1,622 metres (5,322 ft)	24.650°N 72.776°E
Sikkim	Kangchenjunga	1	8,586 metres (28,169 ft)	Eastern Himalayas	Kangchenjunga lies on the India–Nepal border. It is the highest mountain peak located in India and the third highest mountain peak in the world after Mount Everest and K2.	Teesta River at West Bengal border	29	280 metres (920 ft)	2	2,800 metres (9,200 ft)	1	8,306 metres (27,251 ft)	27.704°N 88.148°E
Tamil Nadu	Doddabetta	11	2,637 metres (8,652 ft)	Nilgiri Mountains section of the Western Ghats	Doddabetta is the highest peak in the Nilgiri Mountains.	Arabian Sea	2	Sea level	16	500 metres (1,600 ft)	9	2,637 metres (8,652 ft)	11.401°N 76.736°E
Telangana	Doli Gutta	27	965 metres (3,166 ft)	Deccan Plateau	Doli Gutta lies on the inter-state border between Chhattisgarh and Telangana.	Krishna River at Andhra Pradesh border	16	27 metres (89 ft)	16	500 metres (1,600 ft)	22	938 metres (3,077 ft)	18°20′31″N 80°44′29″E
Tripura	Betlingchhip	29	930 metres (3,050 ft)	Jampui Hills section of the Lushai Hills	Betlingchhip is also known as Thaidawr. It is the highest peak in the Jampui Hills.	Gumti River at Bangladesh–India border	15	15 metres (49 ft)	22	300 metres (980 ft)	23	915 metres (3,002 ft)	23.8097°N 92.2609°E
Uttar Pradesh	Amsot Peak	28	957 metres (3,140 ft)	Rajaji Range section of the Sivalik Hills	Located in Saharanpur District. Amsot Peak lies on the inter-state border between Uttarakhand and Uttar Pradesh. It is the highest peak in the Rajaji Range.	Ganges River at Bihar border	20	47 metres (154 ft)	29	200 metres (660 ft)	24	910 metres (2,990 ft)	30.3798°N 77.6865°E
Uttarakhand	Nanda Devi	2	7,817 metres (25,646 ft)	Garhwal Himalayas	Nanda Devi is the highest mountain peak located entirely within India. It is the highest peak in the Garhwal Himalayas.	Sharda Sagar Reservoir on Uttar Pradesh border	26	187 metres (614 ft)	4	2,500 metres (8,200 ft)	2	7,630 metres (25,030 ft)	30.376°N 79.970°E
West Bengal	Sandakphu	8	3,636 metres (11,929 ft)	Singalila Ridge section of the Eastern Himalayas.	Sandakphu lies on the India–Nepal border. It is the highest peak in the Singalila Ridge.	Bay of Bengal	2	Sea level	29	200 metres (660 ft)	7	3,636 metres (11,929 ft)	27.106°N 88.002°E

== Highpoint gallery ==
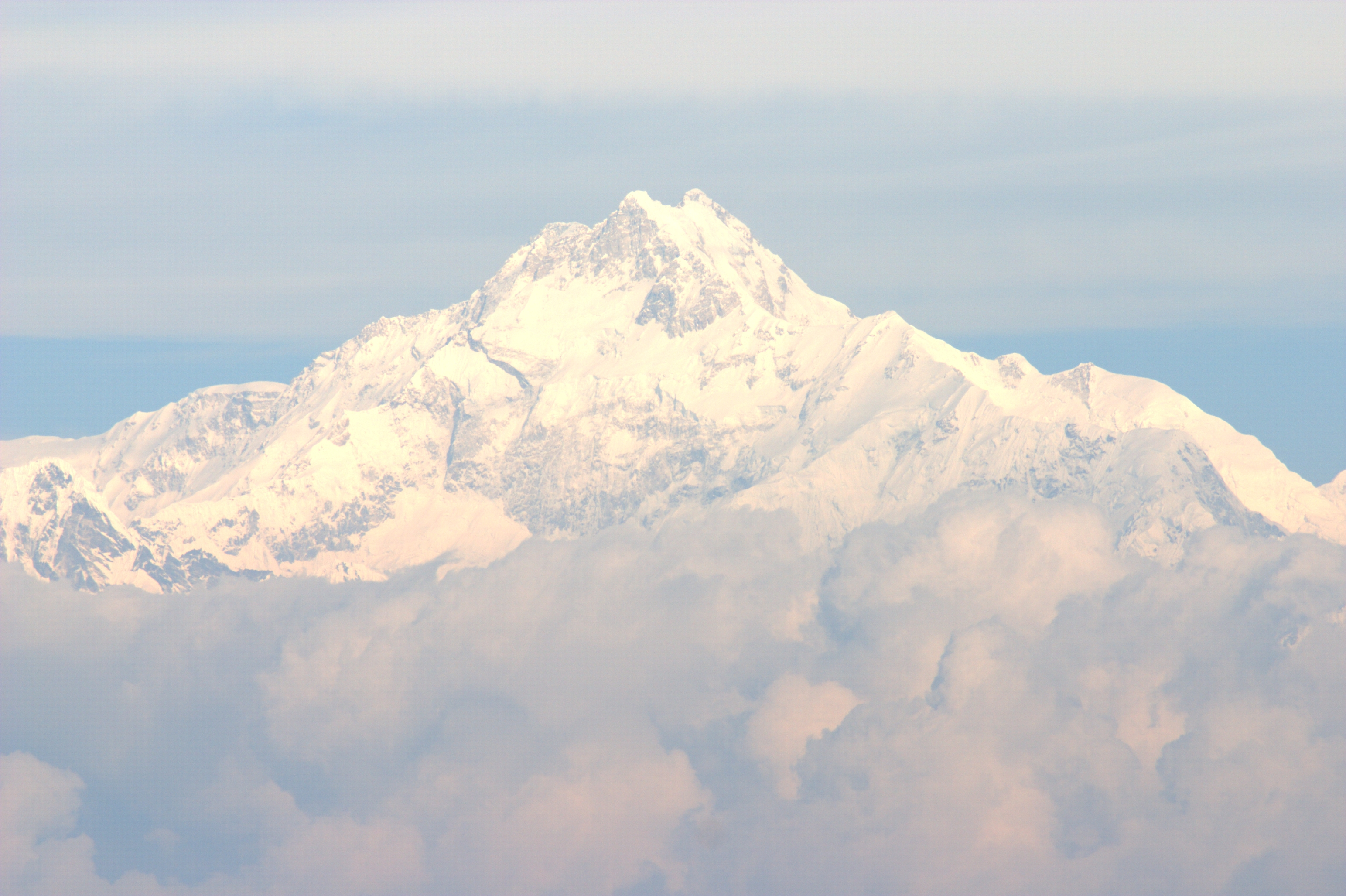
Kangchenjunga (8,586 m)

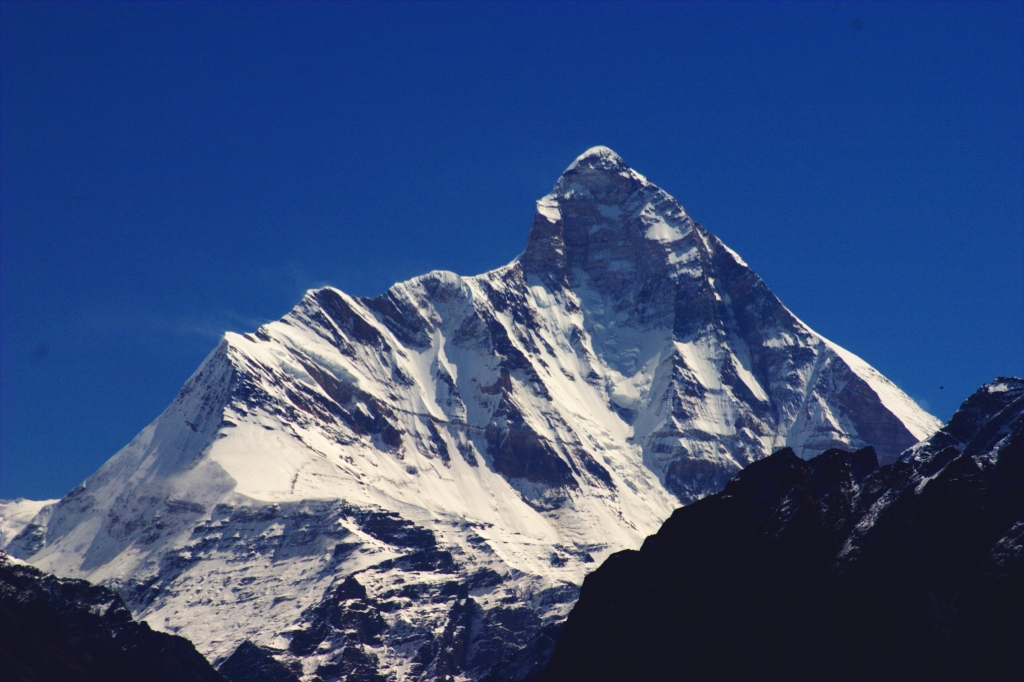
Nanda Devi (7,817 m)

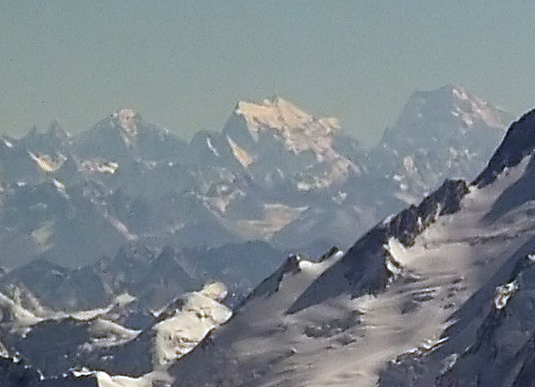
Saltoro Kangri (7,742 m)

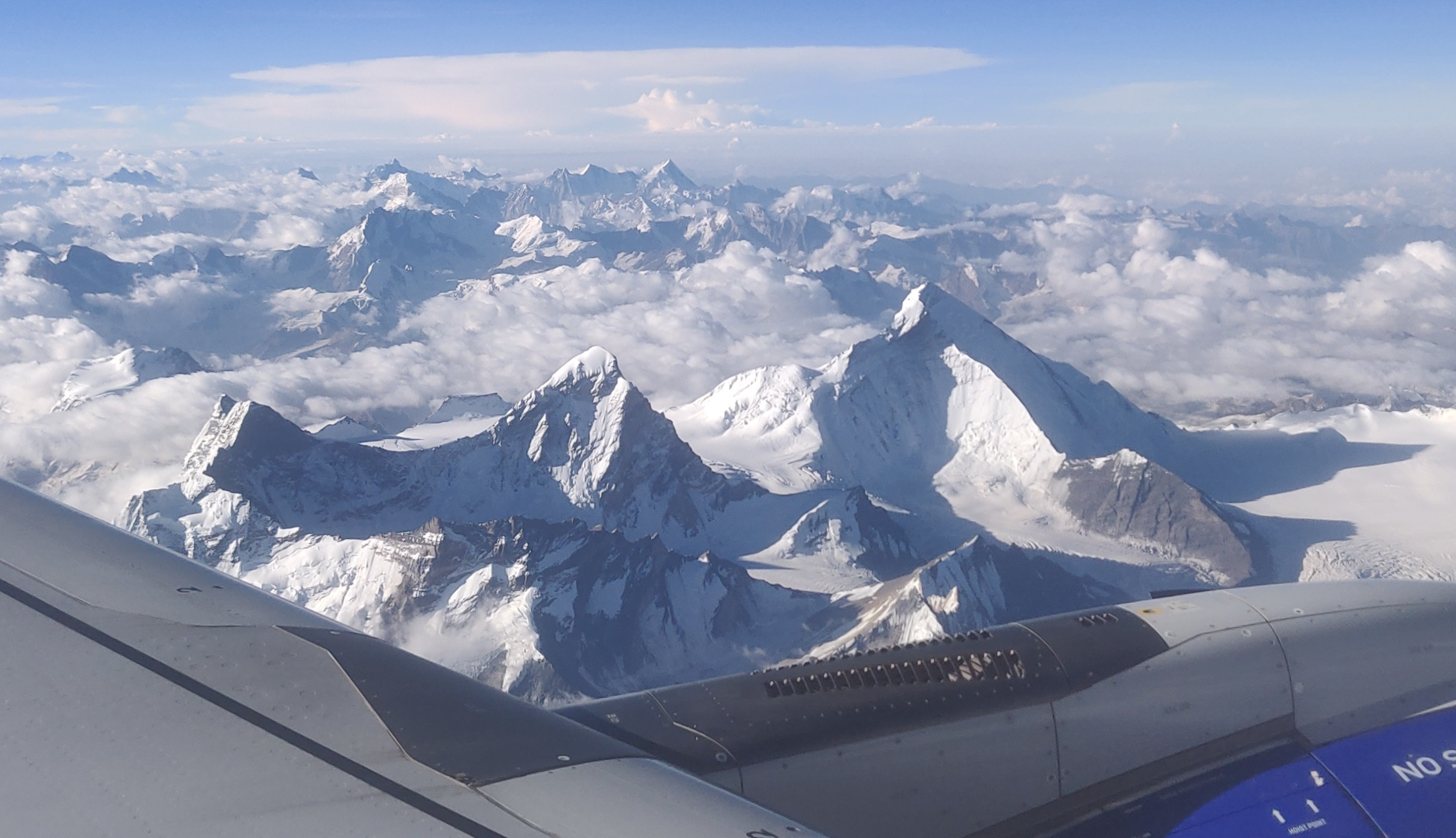
Nun Kun (7,135 m)

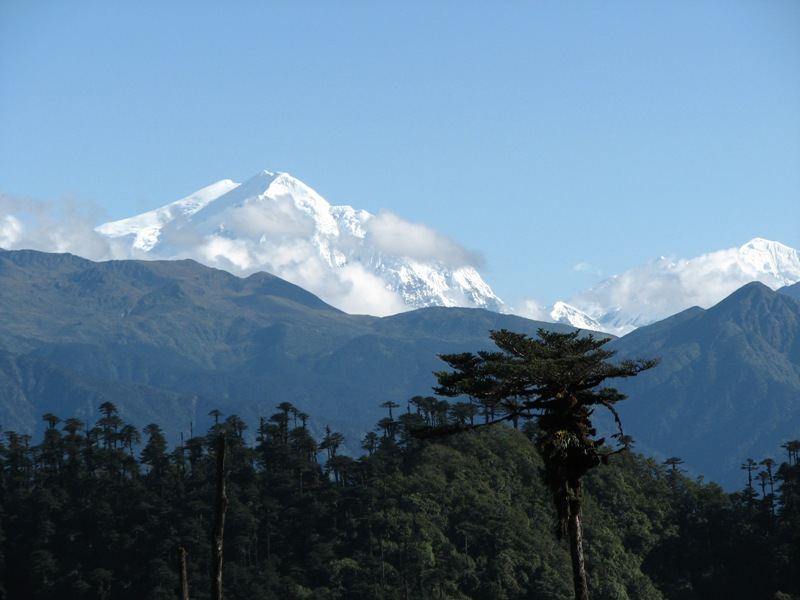
Kangto (7,090 m)

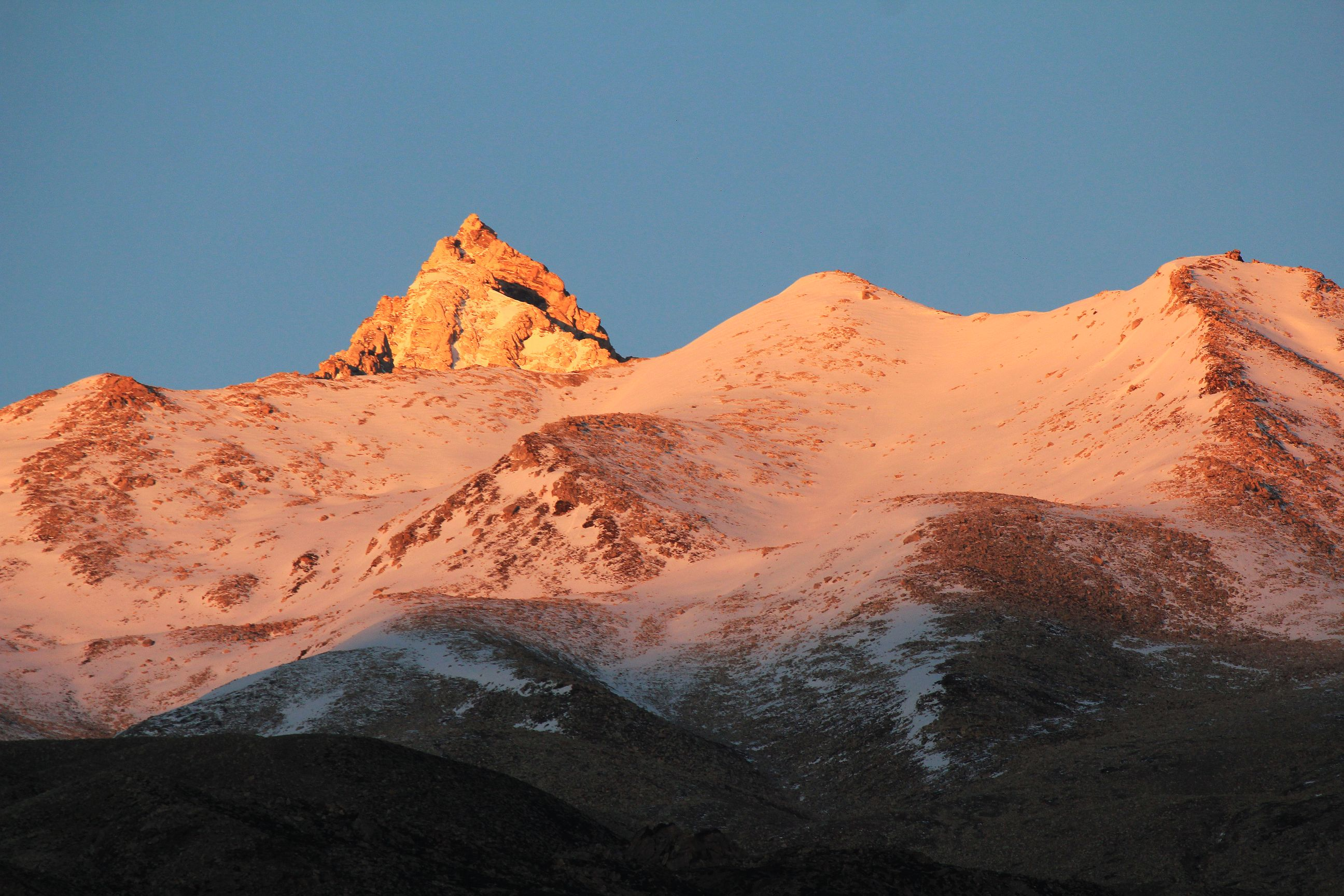
Reo Purgyil (6,816 m)

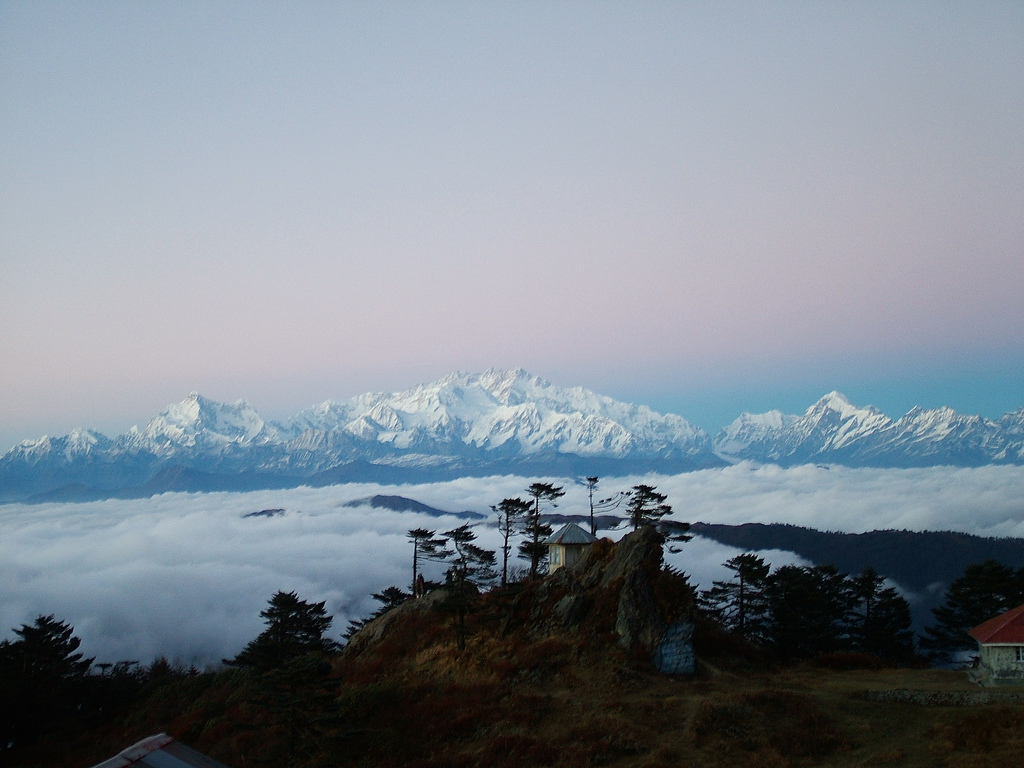
Sandakphu (3,636 m)

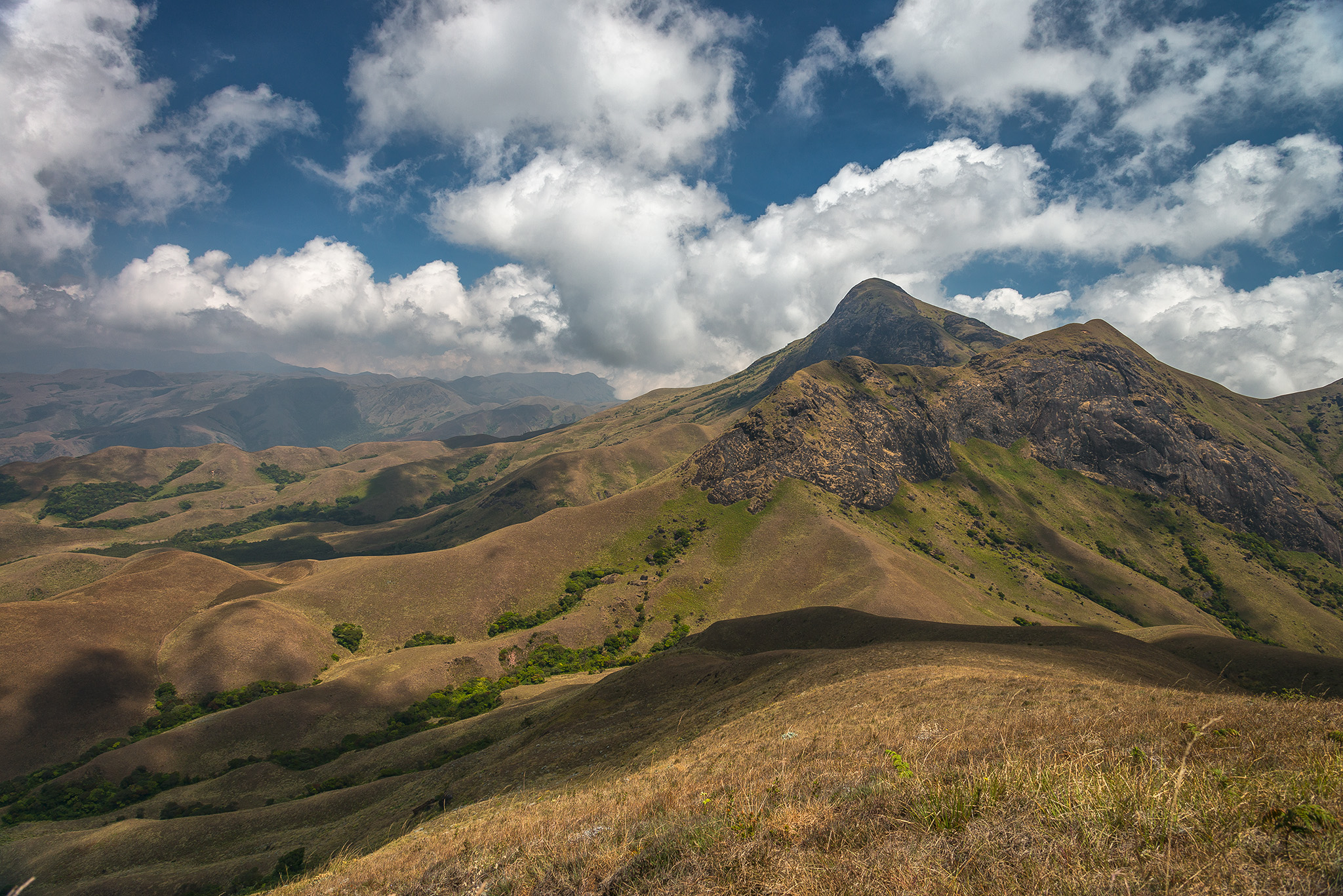
Anamudi (2,695 m)

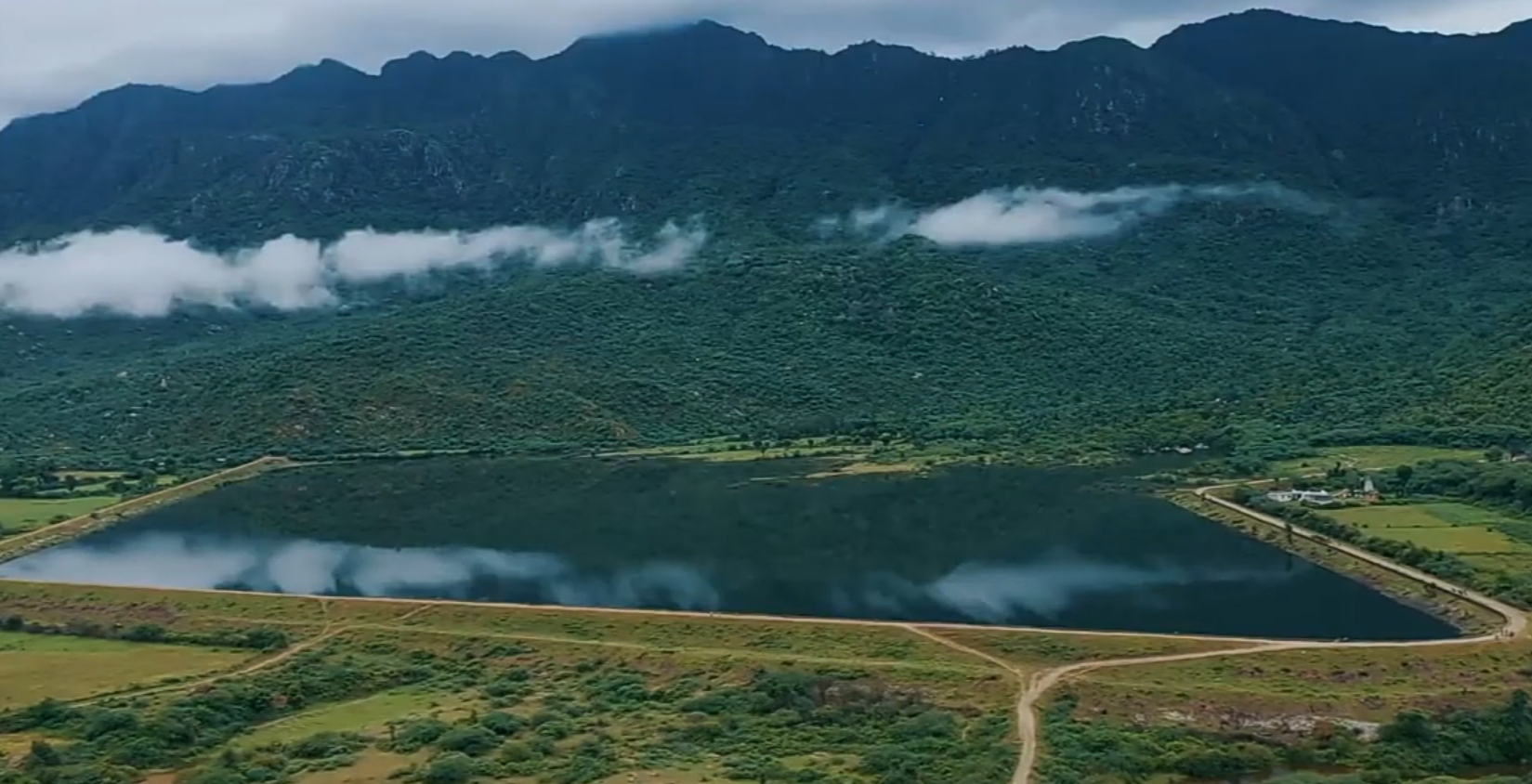
Guru Shikhar (1,722 m)

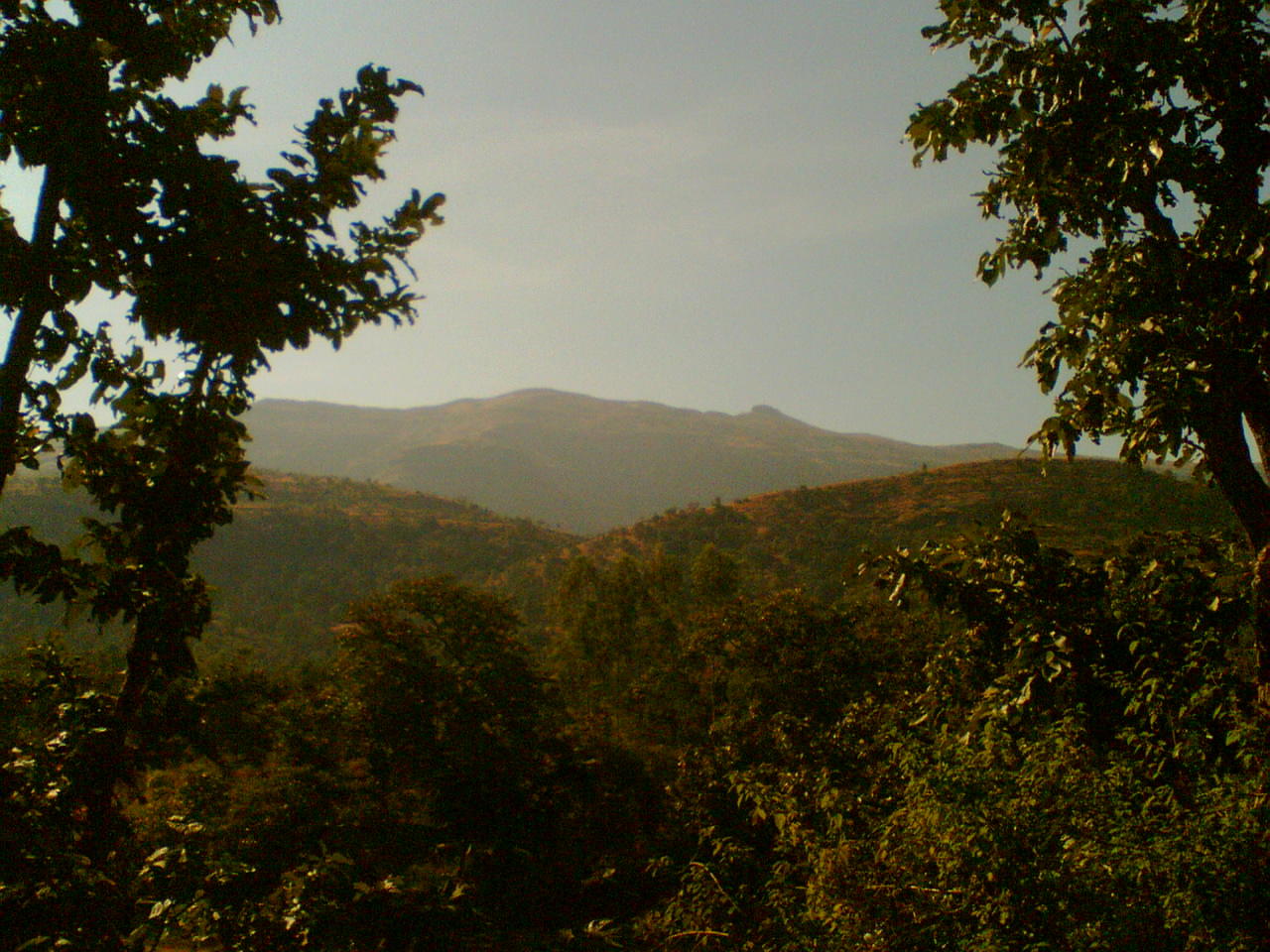
Kalsubai (1,646 m)

== See also ==
- List of hill stations in India
- List of mountains in India
- List of mountain passes of India
- List of the tallest statues in India
- List of tallest buildings in India
- List of tallest structures in India
- Tourism in India
