= Chyavana =

Ancient Hindu sage

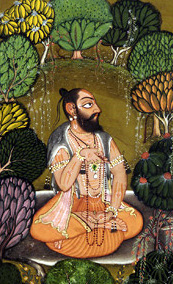
- 17th century artist's imagination of Chyavāna

Personal life
- Spouse: Sukanya
- Children: Aurava, Apnavana, Dadhichi, Pramati, Sumana and Harita
- Parents: Bhrigu (father); Puloma (mother)

Religious life
- Religion: Hinduism

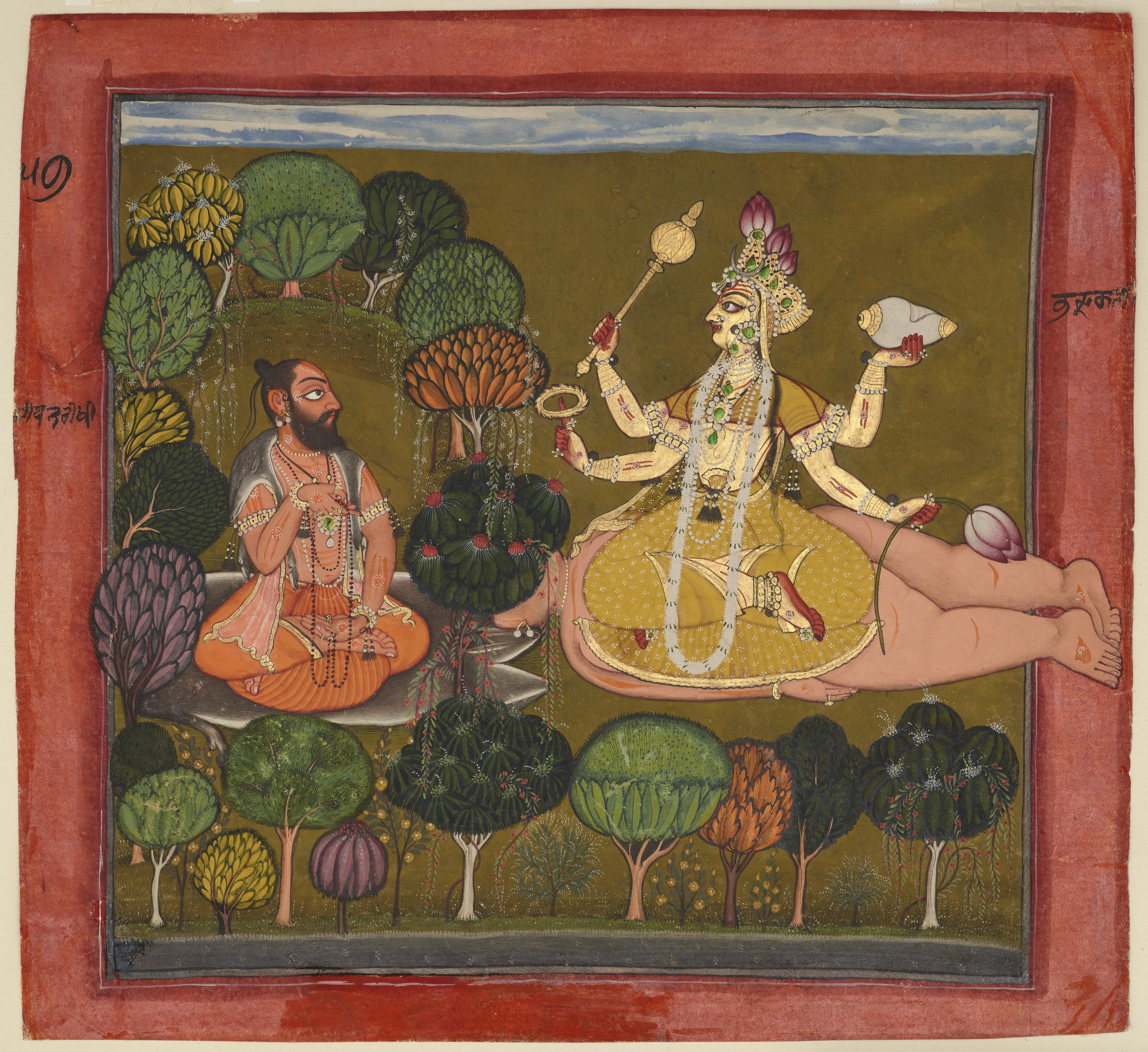
The Goddess worshipped by the sage Chyavana from a Tantric Devi series attributed to Kripal of Nurpur identified as a tantric form of Goddess Lakshmi(active c. 1660 - c. 1690). Freer Gallery of Art

Chyavana (Sanskrit: च्यवन, romanized: Cyavana) was a sage (rishi) in Hinduism. He was a son of Bhrigu, also known as Bhrigu Varuni in the Upanishads, and is known for his rejuvenation through a special herbal paste (ayurvedic jam) or tonic known as chyavanaprasham, which was prepared by the Ashvins. According to the Mahabharata, he was powerful enough to oppose the celestial thunderbolt (vajra) of Indra, and was responsible for the Ashvins getting their share of the sacrificial offerings. He created an asura, Mada, to achieve it.

Chyavana (with a different spelling: च्यवान Cyavāna) is also mentioned in the Rigveda, where he is described as an aged and feeble person whose youth and strength was restored by the twin Aśvins (RV VII.68:6). According to Rigveda X.61:1-3, Cyavāna is a weak opponent of Tūrvayāṇa, an Indra worshipper and a Paktha king, as the former was closer to the Ashvins.

According to one tradition, he married Vaivasvata Manu's daughter Arushi. Their son was Aurva. According to another tradition, he married Sukanyā, daughter of Vedic king Sharyati and granddaughter of Vaivasvata Manu. They had two sons: Apnavana and Dadhicha. He is also considered as the father of Harita and Uddalaka Varuni.

== Legend ==
=== Birth ===
According to an account found in the Mahabharata (Adi Parva, Ch.5-6), when Bhrigu's wife Puloma was pregnant and lived in her hermitage, a rakshasa harassed her. Puloma's child slipped from her womb, called a 'chyuta' child in Sanskrit ("early delivery") and thus received his name Chyavana. The rakshasa released the mother after seeing the child drop, but immediately got converted into ashes.

Chyavana studied the Vedas from his father and later acquired the knowledge of Vedas from Brahma. He subsequently became a Brahmarshi.

=== Austerities and rejuvenation ===
The earliest version of the narrative of Chyavana's practice of austerities and subsequent restoration of youth is found in the Brahmanas. A later version of this narrative is found in the Mahabharata. More later versions are found in the Bhagavata Purana and the Padma Purana.

==== Brahmanas ====
In a narrative found in the Satapatha Brahmana (IV.1.5.1-13), Chyavana is mentioned as a descendant of Bhrigu. While the other Bhrigus were away, Chyavana, with a senile body, was living in his ashrama. Once, King Sharyati, son of Manu, came for hunting near Chyavana's ashrama (hermitage) with his army. Sharyati's children were also with him. They went to Chyavana Rishi's ashrama, where the rishi was in meditation. While white-ants had covered his body, only his eyes were visible. They humiliated Chyavana, and in his fury, the sage cursed them. His curse created discord amongst Sharyati's family. When Sharyati found the cause of his misfortune, he offered his daughter Sukanya in marriage to Chayavana, so that she could take care the revered saint.

Later, the Ashvins came to his ashrama, and tried to seduce Sukanya. Sukanya, who refused to leave her husband, instead asked the Ashvins to restore Chyavana's youth. Following their advice, Chyavana's youth was restored by a combination of three treatments. Certain herbs were put into a pond and the rishi was asked to have a dip in the pond. A herbal paste was prepared for application on the body of the rishi, which was part of 'Kayakalpa'. A special herbal paste, chyavanaprasham, was prepared for the rishi to take as a medicine.

In return, the Ashvins obtained a share in the sacrificial offerings in Kurukshetra on her suggestion. In the Aitareya Brahmana (VIII.21.4), the inauguration of Sharyata by him is compared with Indra's coronation.

==== Mahabharata ====
According to the narrative found in the Vana Parva (Ch.122-5) of the Mahabharata, Chyavana was so absorbed in practising austerities on the side of a lake that termites built up their mound all over his body and only his eyes were left. Once, Sharyati, along with his army and household, came to visit the place. Sukanya, daughter of king Sharyati, seeing only two bright eyes in what seemed to be an anthill, poked them with a stick. Chyavana felt excessive pain and became furious. He obstructed the calls of nature of Sharyati's army. He was pleased only after the king gave him his daughter in marriage. Subsequently, the Ashvins came to the hermitage of Chyavana. They saw Sukanya while she was bathing, and tried to convince Sukanya to reject old and ugly Chyavana and accept one of them as her husband. They also promised to restore the youth of Chyavana first so that she could make an unbiased choice amongst Chyavana and one of them. Sukanya rejected their proposal and informed Chyavana. Later, at the behest of Chyavana, Sukanya requested the Ashvins to do so. All three took bath in the lake and came out with the same youthful divine look. Each of them requested Sukanya to be his bride, but she identified Chyavana and selected him. In gratitude, Chyavana assured the Ashvins that he would ensure that the Ashvins get their share of the sacrificial offerings. Accordingly, Chyavana, while officiating as a priest of Sharyati in a soma sacrifice, offered the share of the sacrifice to the Ashvins. Indra objected to this, stating that as mere servants of the devas, they have no right to receive offering of Soma juice. When the sage ignored his opinion, he tried to hurl his vajra (thunderbolt) towards Chyavana, but his arms were paralysed by Chyavana before he could do so. Chyavana, by virtue of his ascetic energy, created a huge asura, Mada, with four fangs. Mada was on the point of devouring Indra, when he became afraid, and finally accepted the right of the Ashvins to have a share of the offerings.

=== Chyavana and Kushika ===
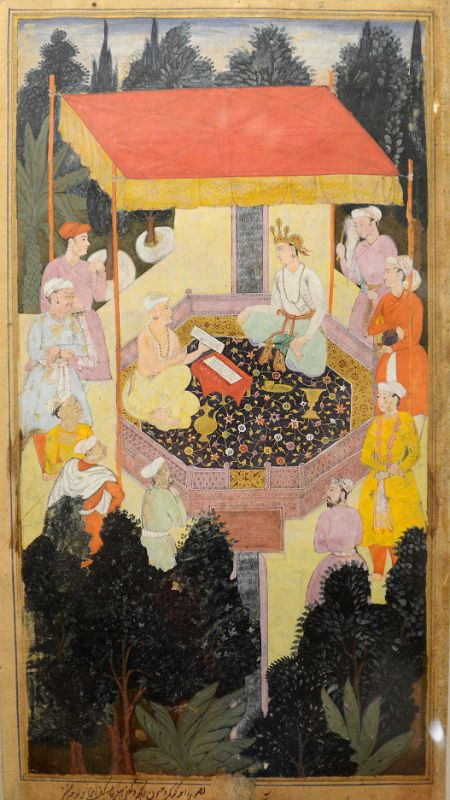
King Kushika with the sage Chyavana.

In a narrative found in the Anushasana Parva (Ch.52-56) of the Mahabharata, Chayvana exacted many menial offices from king Kushika and his queen for 21 days. Later, he was pleased by their devotion and rewarded them by creating a magical palace of gold and predicting the birth of their grandson endued with great energy, Vishvamitra, who would attain the status of a Brahmana.

== Hermitage ==
According to the Padma Purana (Patala Khanda, Ch.8), his hermitage was on the Satpura Range, near the river Payoshni. According to another tradition, his hermitage was in Dhosi Hill in the Vedic State of Brahmavarta, near Narnaul in Mahendragarh district.

== See also ==
- Ashvins
- Shaunaka
- Sukanya
