= Brahmavarta =

Region in Hindu literature

The literary text Manusmriti describes Brahmavarta (Sanskrit: ब्रह्मावर्त, romanized: Brahmāvarta) as the region between the rivers Sarasvati and Drishadvati in India. The text defines the area as a holy land, whose inhabitants set the standards for morality and conduct for the rest of the world to follow. The name has been translated in various ways, including "holy land", "sacred land", "abode of gods", and "the scene of creation".

The precise location and size of the region has been the subject of academic uncertainty. Some scholars, such as the archaeologists Bridget and Raymond Allchin, believe the term Brahmavarta to be synonymous with the Aryavarta region.

== Literature ==
According to the Manusmriti, the purity of a place and its inhabitants decreased the further it was from Brahmavarta. Aryan (noble) people were believed to inhabit the "good" area and the proportion of Mleccha (barbarian) people in the population rose as the distance from it increased. This implies a series of concentric circles of decreasing purity as one moved away from the Brahmavarta centre.

The translation of Manusmriti made by Patrick Olivelle, a professor of Sanskrit, says:

The land created by the gods and lying between the divine rivers Saraswati and Drishadwati is called 'Brahmavarta' - the region of Brahman. The conduct handed down from generation to generation among the social classes and the intermediate classes of that land is called the 'conduct of good people'. Kuruksetra and the lands of the Matsyas, Pancalas, and Surasenakas constitute the 'land of Brahmin seers', which borders on the Brahmavarta. All the people on earth should learn their respective practices from a Brahmin born in that land. (Note: These are the ancient Kuru, Matsya, Panchala and Surasena kingdoms.)

The French Indologist who later converted to Hinduism, Alain Daniélou, notes that the Rig Veda, which is an earlier Hindu text, describes the region later known as Brahmavarta as the heartland of Aryan communities and the geography described in it suggests that those communities had not moved much beyond the area. He says that later texts, contained in the Brahmanas, indicate that the centre of religious activity had moved from Brahmavarta to an adjacent area southeast of it known as Brahmarisihidesha (Sanskrit: ब्रह्मर्षिदेश, romanized: Brahmarṣideśa). (Note: Translated as "Land of Brahmin sages".) Seal dated to Gupta period with inscription 'Brahma Varta'' was excavated from Purana Qila, Delhi.

== See also ==
- Brahmarshi
