= Chyavanprash =

Ayurvedic dietary supplement

Chyavanprash is a herbal dietary supplement.

Chyavanprash (Sanskrit: च्यवनप्राश, romanized: Cyavanaprāśa), originally Chayavanaprasham, is a cooked mixture of sugar, honey, ghee, Indian gooseberry (amla) jam, sesame oil, berries and various herbs and spices. It is prepared as per the instructions suggested in Ayurvedic texts. Chyavanprash is widely sold and consumed in India as a dietary supplement.

== Origin ==
Chyavanprash is an ancient formulation and product. Various ancient Indian texts like Mahabharata, Puranas etc., relate that Ashvin twins, who are Vedic gods of medicine, first prepared this formulation for Chyavana Rishi, hence the name Chyavanprash. The first historically documented formula for chyavanprash appears in the Charaka Samhita, the ancient Ayurvedic treatise from the early first millennium BCE.

== Consumption and Taste ==
Chyavanaprash is usually consumed directly. It can also be consumed along with warm water.

Chyavanaprash tastes sweet and sour at the same time. The taste is dominated by the flavors of honey, ghee (clarified butter) and amla, and the smell by ghee and other spices including sandalwood, cinnamon and cardamom.

== Composition ==
The recipe of chyavanprash is mentioned in manuscripts written for ayurvedic method of treatment viz. Ashtangahridayam, Charakasamhita, Sangandharasamhita. The number of herbs used may vary from 25 to 80 but the main ingredient of all chyavanprash is amla. Other chief ingredients are:

- Ashwagandha (Withania somnifera or Winter cherry)
- Shatavari (Asparagus racemosa)
- Amla
- Bamboo manna
- Blue Egyptian water lily (Makhana)
- Cardamom
- Chebulic myrobalan
- Chinese cinnamon
- Cinnamon bark
- Clove
- Indian rose chestnut
- Country mallow
- Feather foil plant (Phyllanthus niruri or Bhumiamalaki)
- Galls
- Ghee
- Giant potato (Ipomoea mauritiana or Kiribadu Ala)
- Giloy (Guduchi) (Tinospora cordifolia)
- Honey
- Indian kudzu
- Irish root
- Liquorice
- Long pepper (Piper longum)
- Malabar nut (Seed of Adhatoda vasica)
- Nut grass
- Potassium sorbate
- Raisins
- Round zedoary
- Sandalwood
- Sesame oil
- Spreading hogweed (Boerhavia diffusa)
- Sugar
- Tiger's claw or Ice plant (Erythrina variegata)
- Wild black gram
- Wild green gram

All of the major brands of chyavanprash were determined to be safe with respect to heavy metal content as of 2011 by Consumer Voice.
