= Amavasu dynasty =

Cadet branch of the Lunar dynasty in Hinduism

The Amavasu dynasty (Sanskrit: अमावसुवंश, romanized: Amāvasuvaṃśa) refers to a cadet branch of the Lunar dynasty (Chandravamsha) featured in Hindu literature. This dynasty is named after Amavasu, the youngest son of Pururavas, the first monarch of the Lunar dynasty, and the apsara Urvashi.

== Genealogy ==
Amavasu was the youngest son of Pururavas and Urvashi. He was also called Vijaya.His son was Kanyakubja, regarded to be the founder of Kannauj. His descendants are also believed to have founded Gaya (Bihar). Some of the most notable descendants of Amavasu include Sage Vishvamitra and Vasu.

1. Amavasu
2. Kanyakubja
3. Vishvajit
4. Bhima
5. Nagnajit
6. Kanchanaprabha
7. Suhotra
8. Jahnu
9. Sunaha
10. Ajaka
11. Balakashva
12. Kusha
13. Kushanabha, Kushamba, Amurtarajas, and Uparichara Vasu.
14. Amurtarajasa (son of Amurtarajas) and Gadhi (the son of Kushanabha who succeeded his father in Kanyakubja).
15. Gaya (the son of Amrutaryasa, who is regarded founded Gaya which is now in Bihar) and Vishvaratha/Kaushika (Vishvamitra), the son of Gadhi. Satyavati (daughter of Gadhi; wife of Richika)
16. Ashtaka, Shakuntala, Shunahshepa, and others, the children of Vishvamitra. Jamadagni (the son of Satyavati; married the daughter of Suryavamsha king Prasenajit, and sister of Suryavamsha king Yuvanashva, Renuka)
17. Bharata, the son of Shakuntala. Parashurama and five other boy, the sons of Jamadagni.
18. Descendants of Bharata

== See also ==
- Solar dynasty
- Lunar dynasty
- Yadu dynasty

== External links and sources ==
- Mahabharata
- Amavasu Dynasty
- The Mahabharata of Krishna-Dwaipayana Vyasa Translated into English Prose, Bharata Press, Calcutta (1883–1896)
- J.P. Mittal, History Of Ancient India (A New Version) : From 7300 Bb To 637 Ad
