= Bharadvaja =

Sage in Hinduism

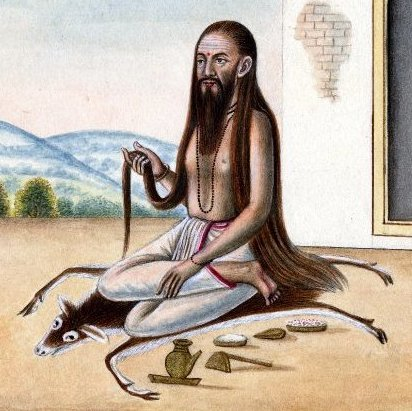
A 19th-century watercolour painting of Bharadvaja

Bharadvaja (Sanskrit: भरद्वाज, IAST: Bharadvāja; also spelled Bharadwaja) was an ancient rishi associated with a pastoralist group of the same name among the early Vedic people. The name further designates the gotra of his descendants, the Bharadvajas, many of whom appear as rishis and brahmanas in Vedic and later texts. Hymns ascribed to members of this family form a major portion of the Rigveda, above all the sixth mandala, together with others in the fourth, ninth and tenth. The family is represented by some sixteen seers. Bharadvaja, son of Brihaspati, is traditionally regarded as its founder, though many of the hymns later attributed to him or to Bharadvaja Barhaspatya were more probably composed by remote descendants. Early Bharadvajas worshipped the pastoral god Pushan; subsequent Rigvedic hymns incorporated him into the wider pantheon as Indra’s brother or helper and linked him with Soma. With this rise in Pushan’s status the Bharadvajas became sacrificial officiants for pastoralist tribes, and their compositions, including the earliest hymn praising the sacred character of the cow (VI.28), were given a place in the Rigveda. The sixth-mandala hymns reflect both pastoral life and a martial aspect, with references to Atharvanic magic and connections to the Atharvangirases.

In later literature the name gains greater prominence. The Shatapatha Brahmana mentions a Bharadvaja teacher. Puranic and epic mythology, often inconsistent, feature a sage as well as a son of Brihaspati. The latter myths centre on the adoption by King Bharata of a son of Brihaspati named Bharadvaja, referring to the double pregnancy of Mamata by Utathya and Brihaspati. From this figure, a brahmana by birth and king by adoption, both brahmanas and kshatriyas are said to have descended. The epic Mahabharata also records martial traditions, including the recovery of Kashi by Pratardana with Bharadvaja's aid, the birth of Drona by the nymph Ghritachi, and a long association with astras.

== Etymology ==
The word Bharadvaja is a compound Sanskrit from "bhara(d)" and "vaja(m)", which together mean "bringing about nourishment". The sage lends his name to at least one yoga asana called Bharadvajasana ("nourishing pose").

== Description ==
His full name in Vedic texts is Bharadvaja Barhaspatya, the last name referring to his father and Vedic deity-sage Brihaspati. His mother was Mamata, wife of Utathya Rishi, who was the elder brother of Barhaspati. In the Bhagavata Purana, he is named as Vitatha. He is one of seven rishis mentioned four times in the Rigveda as well as in the Shatapatha Brahmana, thereafter revered in the Mahabharata and the Puranas. In some later Puranic legends, he is described as the son of Vedic sage Atri.

In Buddhist Pali canonical texts such as Digha Nikaya, Tevijja Sutta describes a discussion between the Buddha and Vedic scholars of his time. The Buddha names ten rishis, calls them "early sages" and makers of ancient verses that have been collected and chanted in his era, and among those ten rishis is Bharadvaja. (Note: The Buddha names the following as "early sages" of Vedic verses, "Atthaka (either Ashtavakra or Atri), Vamaka, Vamadeva, Vessamitta (Visvamitra), Yamataggi (Jamadagni), Angirasa, Bharadvaja, Vasettha (Vasistha), Kassapa (Kashyapa) and Bhagu (Bhrigu)".)

The ancient Hindu medical treatise Charaka Samhita attributes Bharadvaja learning medical sciences to Indra, after pleading that "poor health was disrupting the ability of human beings from pursuing their spiritual journey", and then Indra provides both the method and specifics of medical knowledge.

Bharadvaja is considered to be the initiator of the Bharadvāja gotra of the Brahmins, Khatris, Bharadvaja is the third in the row of the Pravara Rishis (Aangirasa, Barhaspatya, Bharadvaja) and is the first in the Bharadvaja Gotris, with the other two rishis being initiators of Gotras with their respective names.

== Texts ==
Bharadvaja and his family of students are 55. Bharadvaja and his family of students were the traditional poets of king Marutta of the Vedic era, in the Hindu texts.

Bharadvaja is a revered sage in the Hindu traditions, and like other revered sages, numerous treatises composed in the ancient and medieval eras are reverentially named after him. Some treatises named after him or attributed to him include:

- Dhanur-veda, credited to Bharadvaja in chapter 12.203 of the Mahabharata, is an Upaveda treatise on archery.
- Bharadvaja samhita, a Pancharatra text (an Agama text of Vaishnavism).
- Bharadvaja srautasutra and grhyasutra, a ritual and rites of passage text from first millennium BCE. After the Kalpasutra by Baudhayana, these Bharadvaja texts are among the oldest srauta and grhya sutras known.
- Sections in Ayurveda. Bharadvaja theories on medicine and causal phenomenon is described in Charaka Samhita. Bharadvaja states, for example, that an embryo is not caused by wish, prayers, urging of mind or mystical causes, but it is produced from the union of a man's sperm and menstrual blood of a woman at the right time of her menstrual cycle, in her womb. According to Gerrit Jan Meulenbeld, Bharadvaja is credited with many theories and practical ideas in ancient Indian medicine.
- Niti sastra, a treatise on ethics and practical conduct.
- Bharadvaja-siksa, is one of many ancient Sanskrit treatises on phonetics.

== Epics and Puranic scriptures ==
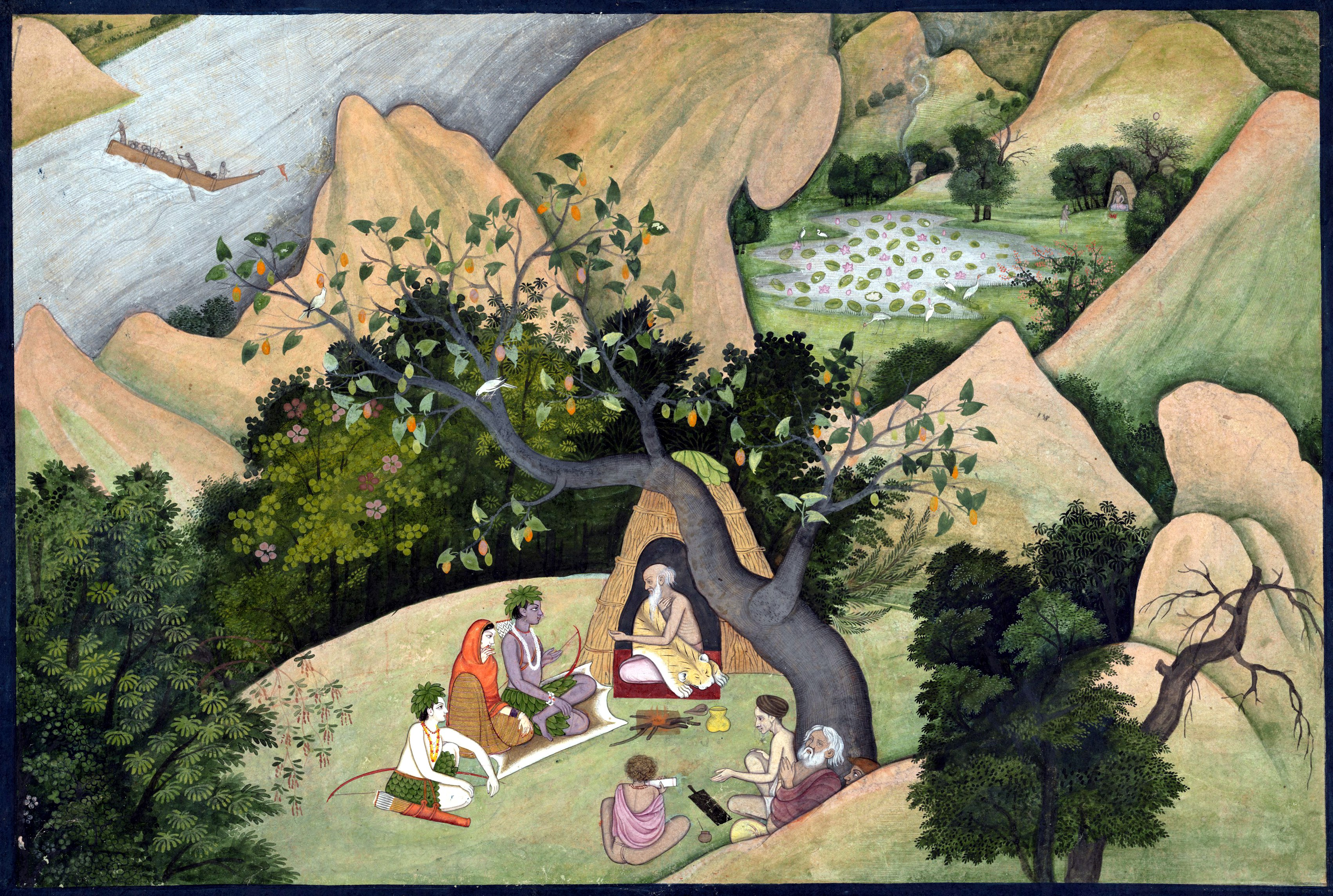
An 18th-century painting of Śrī Rāma, Sītā and Lakṣmaṇa with sage Bharadvāja

According to one legend, Bharadvaja married Sushila and had a son named Garga and a daughter named Devavarshini. According to some other legends, Bharadvaja had two daughters named Ilavida and Katyayani, who married Vishrava and Yajnavalkya respectively. According to Vishnu Purana, Bharadvaja had a brief liaison with an apsara named Ghritachi, and together they had a child who grew up into a warrior-Brahmin named Drona. In the Mahabharata, Drona is instead born when Bharadvaja ejaculated his semen in a pot. Bharadvaja is therefore directly linked to two important characters of the epic Mahabharata — Dronacharya and Aśvatthāma, the son of Drona. According to the Mahabharata, Bharadvaja trained Drona in the use of weapons. Bharadvaja had two disciples: Agnivesa and Drupada. Agnivesa taught Drona the mastery of the weapon Agneya, while Drupada became the king of Panchala kingdom.

One legend in the Mahabharata states that King Bharata adopted Bharadvaja as his son when he was delivered to the king by the Marutas. Bharadvaja married a kshatriya woman named Sushila. According to the Bhagavata Purana, Bharadvaja beget a son named Manyu also known as Bhumanyu while in the Mahabharata Bhumanyu is born to him by a yajna.

=== Rāmāyaṇa ===
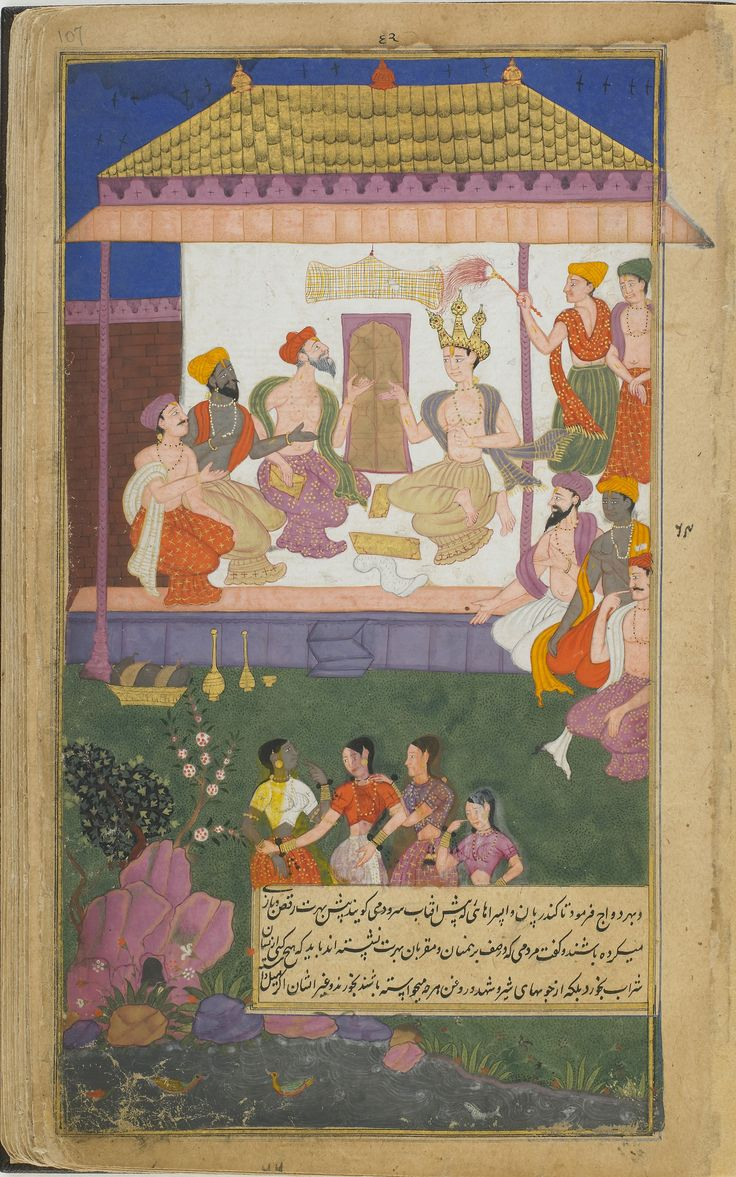
Bharadvaja orders a great feast prepared for Bharata and his men

In the epic Ramayana, Rama, Sita and Lakshmana meet Bharadvaja at his ashrama (hermitage) at the start of their fourteen-year exile. The sage asks them to stay with him through the exile, but they insist on going deeper into the forest to Chitrakuta, which was three krosha away from the ashram. Bharadvaja gives them directions. Bharata is received at the ashrama by Bharadvaja when attempted to locate Rama in order to bring Sita, Lakshmana, and him back to Ayodhya. He reappears at various times in the epic. According to James Lochtefeld, the Bharadvaja in the Ramayana is different from the Vedic sage mentioned in Panini's Ashtadhyayi.
