= Shunahshepa =

Vedic sage

Sunahsepa / Devarata Vaiśvāmitra

In-universe information
- Family: Vishvamitra
- Children: Yajnavalkya
- Religion: Historical Vedic religion

Shunahshepa (Sanskrit: शुनःशेप, romanized: Śunaḥśepa) is a legendary sage mentioned in Hindu mythology. A number of passages in Rigveda are attributed to him. He was adopted by the sage Vishvamitra, and given the new name Devarata. His name is also transliterated as Cunahcepa, Cunahçepa, Sunahsephas, Sunahshepa, and Shunashepa. He was first mentioned in Mandala 1, Hymn 24 of the Rigveda as a devotee of the God Varuna.

According to a legend, Shunahshepa was chosen to be sacrificed in a ritual, but was saved after praying to the Rigvedic deities. The earliest extant text to mention this legend is Aitareya Brahmana (7.13-18) of Rigveda. The story is repeated in the Balakanda (1.61) of Valmiki's Ramayana with some variations. Several other texts borrow the story: these include Sankhyana Srauta Sutra, Baudhayana Shrauta Sutra, the Puranas, and the works of Chandrakirti among others.

== Legend ==
=== Aitareya Brahmana ===
King Harishchandra of the Ikshvaku dynasty had 100 wives, but no son. On advice of the sage Narada, he prayed to the deity Varuna for a son. Varuna granted the boon, in exchange for an assurance that Harishchandra would make a sacrifice to Varuna in the future. As a result of this boon, a son named Rohita (or Rohitaswa) was born to the king. After his birth, Varuna came to Harishchandra and demanded that the child be sacrificed to him. The king postponed the sacrifice multiple times citing various reasons, but finally agreed to it when Rohita became an adult. Rohita refused to be sacrificed and escaped to forest. Varuna became angry, and afflicted Harishchandra with a stomach illness. Rohita occasionally visited his ill father, but on advice of Indra, always refused to accept being sacrificed.

In the sixth year of wandering in the forest, Rohita met a destitute, starving brahmin named Ajigarta Sauyavasi with three sons, who was a descendant of Angiras. Rohita offered Ajigarta one hundred cows in exchange for one of his sons to be sacrificed to Varuna in his place. Ajigarta agreed to the offer, and because he didn't want his eldest son to be sacrificed, and his wife didn't want their youngest son to be sacrificed, the middle son – Shunahshepa – was chosen as the victim. Rohita then gave the promised hundred cows to Ajigarta, and took Shunahshepa and Ajigarta to the royal palace.

Varuna agreed to the replacement on the basis that a brahmin was an acceptable (higher caste) substitute for a kshatriya. King Harishchandra combined the sacrifice with his own Rajasuya ceremony. Four priests were called to conduct the sacrifice: Agastya (the udgatr), Jamadagni (the adhvaryu), Vashistha (the brahman), and Vishvamitra (the hotar). However, all of them refused to bind Shunahshepa to the sacrificial post. Ajigarta then offered to bind his son for another hundred cows. Rohita accepted the offer, and Ajigarta bound Shunahshepa to the post. However, the priests refused to slaughter him. Ajigarta then offered to sacrifice his own son in exchange for another hundred cows. The prince agreed to his demand. As Ajigarta readied to kill his own son, Shunahshepa prayed to the Rigvedic deities. With his last hymn, which invoked Ushas (the deity of the dawn), his bonds were loosened and King Harishchandra was also cured of his illness.

Vishvamitra, one of the priests, offered to adopt Shunahshepa as his eldest son. Shunahshepa agreed, reviling his natural father, Ajigarta, as a shudra. Vishvamitra gave him the name Devarata ("deity-given"). Half of Vishvamitra's natural sons – those younger than Devarata – accepted him as their elder brother. However, those older than Devarata refused to accept the terms of his adoption (as their nominal elder). Vishvamitra then cursed their offspring to be exiled out of Aryavarta. According to the Aitareya Brahmana, the descendants of these 50 sons included the Āndhras, the Mūtibas, the Pulindas, the Pundras, the Shabaras, and the various Dasyu tribes.

=== Ramayana ===
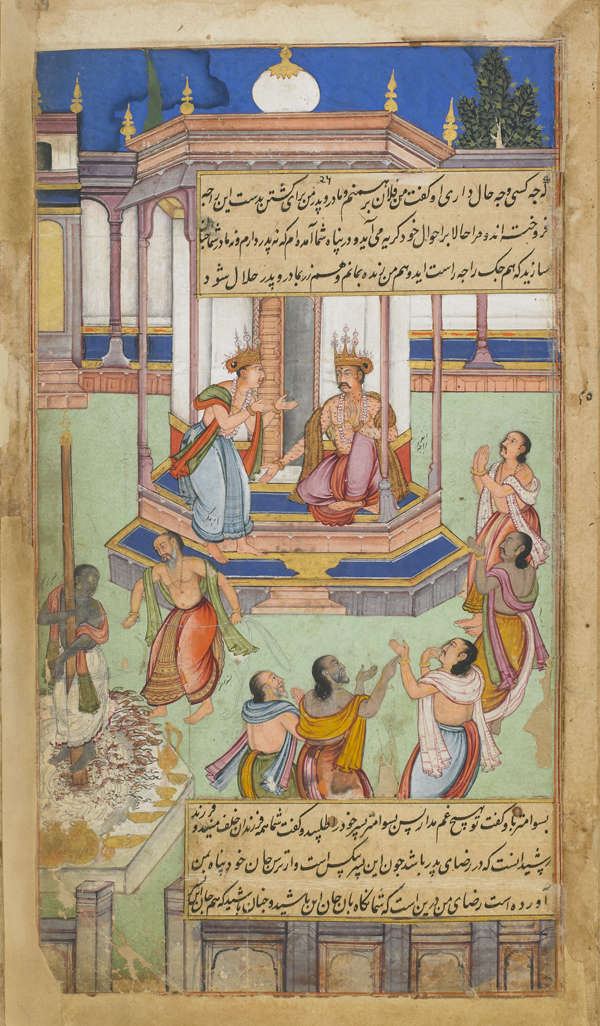
A 16th century Mughal era depiction of Ambarisha offering Sunahsepha in sacrifice

King Ambarisha of Ayodhya was engaged in a sacrificial ceremony, when his animal-victim was stolen by Indra. The priest conducting the ceremony told the king that he needed to find the animal, or perform a human sacrifice to avert the misfortune resulting from the situation. The king tried to search for the horse unsuccessfully. While searching for the animal, he came across the sage Richika (Ṛcīka) in the mountain region known as Bhrugutunda. He offered to buy one of the sage's three sons for the human sacrifice. The sage refused to part with his eldest son, and his wife refused to part with the youngest. The middle one - Shunahshepa - volunteered to go with the king. The king gave Richika one hundred thousand cows and gold coins, and left with Shunahshepa.

On the way to the King's place, the two took a rest break at the sacred site of Pushkara. There, they encountered the sage Vishvamitra, whom Shunahshepa recognized as his maternal uncle. Shunahshepa sought the sage's refuge, asking him to do something that would conclude the king's rite successfully but also save his life. The sage asked his sons if any of them were willing to replace Shunahshepa in the sacrifice. His sons rejected the demand with scorn, stating that it would be equivalent to eating dog meat. Angered at their impudence, Vishvamitra cursed his sons to be reborn as outcaste dog-meat eaters for a thousand years, just like Vashistha's sons.

Vishwamitra then turned to Shunahshepa, and asked him to recite two hymns during the sacrifice. Ambarisha and Shunahshepa then reached the palace, where the sacrificial ceremony started. Ambarisha concluded the Ashvamedha ceremony successfully, and Shunahshepa recited Vishwamitra's hymns as he was about to be sacrificed. Indra then appeared on the spot, and blessed him with a long life. He also rewarded Ambarisha for his sacrifice.

== Interpretations ==
According to scholars like Arthur Berriedale Keith and Rudolf von Roth, the intent of the legend is to show that human sacrifice (purushamedha) is an unacceptable practice. However, some others, such as Rajendralal Mitra, Max Müller and Julius Eggeling, believe that the legend indicates the existence of human sacrifice as a practice around the time the legend originated, and that the legend marks Shunahshepa's case as an exception.

According to David Gordon White, the original Shunahshepa myth alluded to in Rigveda (in passages attributed to Shunahshepa) may have been an astronomical explanation for the fact that the three stars in the Ursa Minor's tail never fall below the line of horizon. However, its variants in Aitareya Brahmana and Sankhyana Srauta Sutra are an origin myth for the outcasts, who are described as the descendants of Vishvamitra's disobedient sons.

David Shulman interprets the story as a tale about father-son relationships:

- The loving father Harishchandra tries to postpone his son Rohita's death, before he reluctantly agrees to the inevitable sacrifice.
- The inhumane father Ajigarta not only sells his son, but also agrees to murder him for an additional payment.
- Vishvamitra falls somewhere in the middle of the spectrum, cursing the sons who don't obey him and rewarding the ones who do.

== In popular culture ==
The story of Shunahshepa has been retold and adapted into poetry and plays in India. These versions vary from each other depending on which version of the story they are based on.

=== Poetry ===
- Jaishankar Prasad's poetry collection "Karunalay" features a retelling of the story of Shunahshepa in the form of poetic drama or gītināṭya.

=== Graphic Novel ===
- Amar Chitra katha new series number DG461 titled "Shunahshepa," published in 1983, tells the story of Shunahshepa in the form of a graphic novel.

== See also ==
- Purushamedha, human sacrifice ritual described in the Yajurveda
- Jephthah and Binding of Isaac, legends of filicide in Hebrew texts
