= Subahu =

Rakshasa in the epic Ramayana

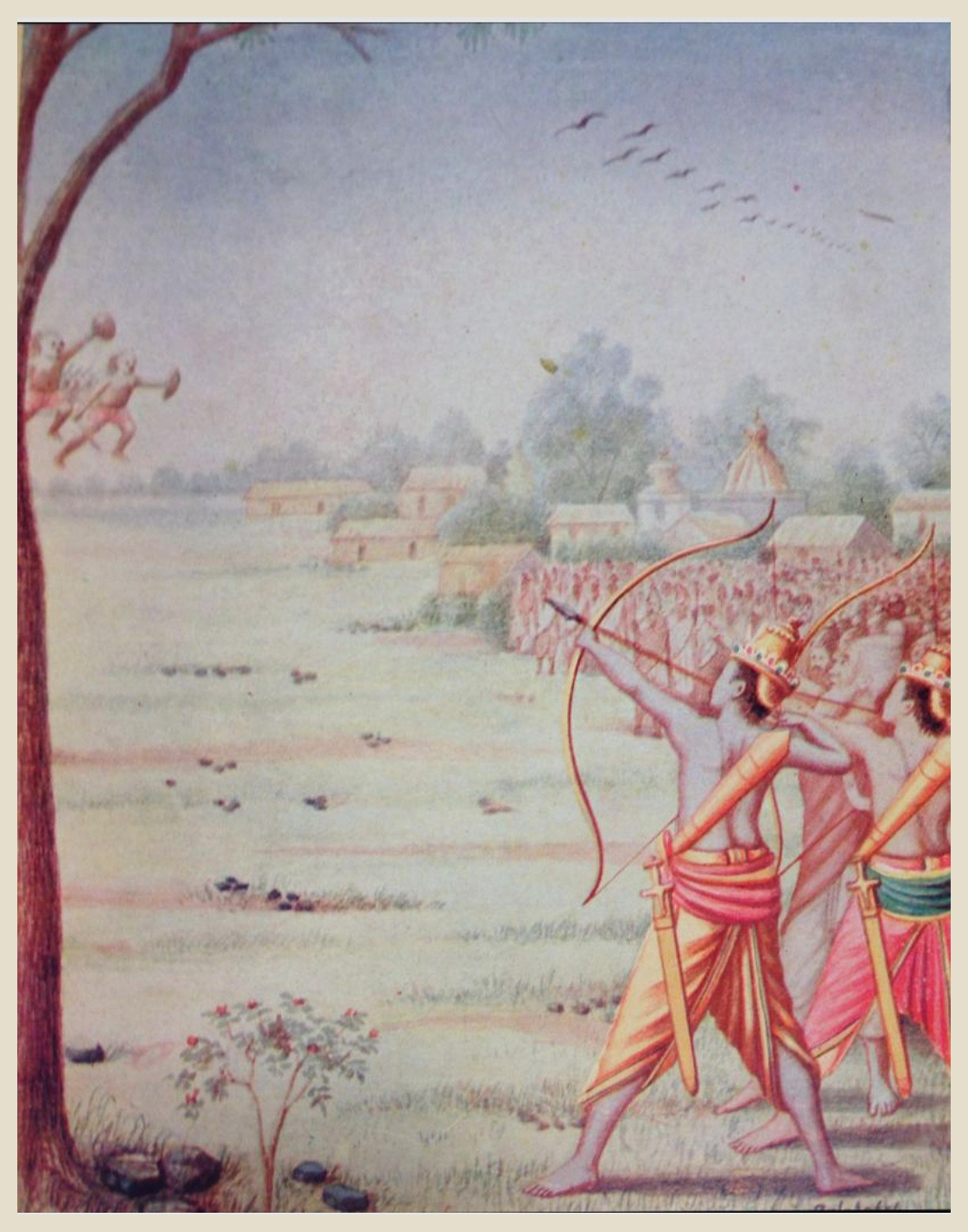
- Painting of the death of Subahu by Rama

In-universe information
- Family: Sunda (father), Tadaka (mother)
- Children: Piglāksha

Subahu (Sanskrit: सुबाहु, romanized: Subāhu) was a rakshasa featured in the Hindu epic Ramayana.

== Story ==
Subahu was the son of Sunda and Tadaka. Subahu, with his brother Maricha and their mother, Tataka, took immense pleasure in harassing the munis of the jungle, especially Vishvamitra, by disrupting their yajnas with rains of flesh and blood.

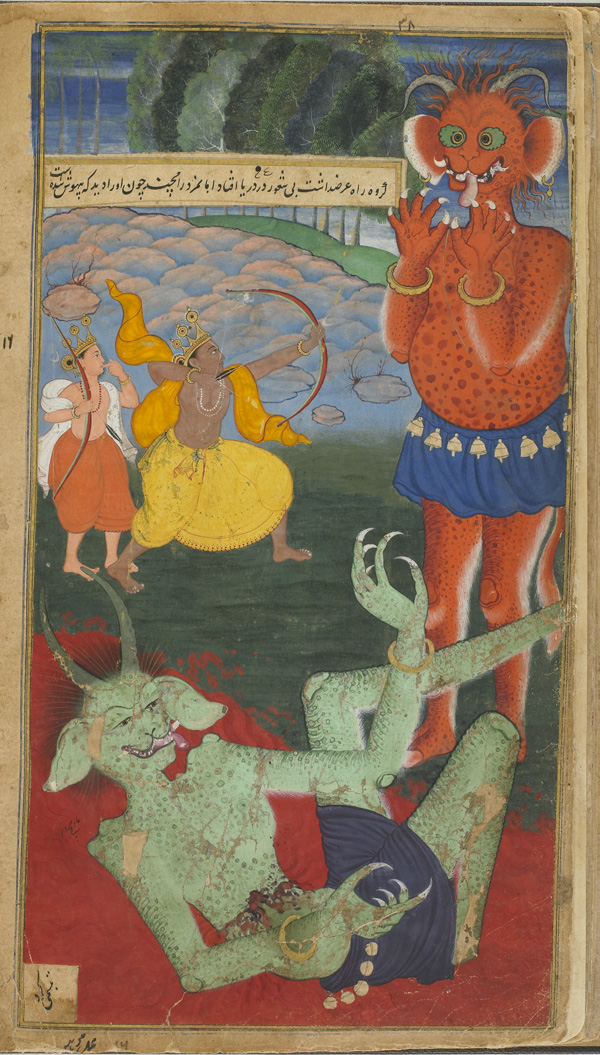
Rama and Laksmana confront the demons Marica and Subahu

Vishvamitra approached Dasharatha for help in getting rid of these pestilences. Dasharatha obliged by sending two of his sons, Rama and Lakshmana, to the forest with Vishvamitra, charging them to protect both the sage and his sacrificial fires.

When Subahu and Maricha again attempted to rain flesh and blood on the sage's yajna, Subahu was killed by Rama.

Maricha escaped to Lanka. Out of the fear of Rama, he lived as a sage but was then ordered by Ravana to trick Rama into hunting him down (and kidnap his wife Sita). Maricha refused and tried to persuade Ravana to not commit such a dreadful sin. However, Ravana insisted and threatened to kill him. Maricha eventually decided to be killed by Rama since it was better to die at the hands of God rather than Ravana. He was eventually killed by Rama when he took the form of a deer to distract him. Just before his death, he called out in Rama's voice for Lakshmana's help. This eventually lured Lakshmana away from Sita, and allowed Ravana to assume the form of a sage and abduct her.

== In popular culture ==
In 2026, Subahu was portrayed by Parminder Chadda in the film, Ramayana: Part 1.
