= Purushamedha =

Mock Human sacrifice ritual followed by the Śrauta tradition of Vedic religion

Purushamedha (or Naramedha) is a Śrauta ritual of mock human sacrifice. The Vajasaneyi Samhita-Sataphatha Brahmana-Katyayana Srauta Sutra sequence of Shukla Yajur Veda texts contains the most details.

Whether actual human sacrifice was taking place has been debated since Colebrooke brought the issue under attention in 1805. He regarded it as a symbolic ritual. Since there is no inscriptural or other record of Purushamedha ever being performed, some scholars suggest it was invented simply to round out sacrificial possibilities. Asko Parpola suggests actual human sacrifices are described in Vedic texts, while the Brahmanas show the practice diminishing. (Note: "I therefore discuss first a few important textual references and their interpretation, hoping to establish beyond reasonable doubt that Vedic texts do indeed attest to real human sacrifices performed within the memory preserved by the authors, and that by the time of the Brahmana texts, the actual practice of bloody offering had already begun to diminish." Parpola (2007) p. 161) In Shatapatha Brahmana 13.6.2, an ethereal voice intervenes to halt the proceedings. The dhatupatha of Aṣṭādhyāyī by Pāṇini defines the root medha as synergizing the energy to perform something fruitful.

== Historical development ==
=== During the Vedic period ===
Scholars doubt the Purushamedha as actual human sacrifice was ever performed. (Note: "There is no inscriptional or other record that a purusamedha was ever performed, leading some scholars to suggest it was simply invented to round out sacrificial possibilities." (pg. 237)) However, according to Jan Houben, the actual occurrence of human sacrifice would be difficult to prove since the relevant pieces of evidence would be small in number.

=== Rise of Sramanic religions ===
According to Jan Houben, the Later Vedic period was followed by a period of embarrassment about violence in rituals. This period corresponds to the rise of Sramanic religions such as Buddhism and Jainism, both of which place emphasis on nonviolence (ahimsa). This period also corresponds to the composition of the Shatapatha Brahmana, which states that the victims of a Purushamedha are supposed to be released, and the composition of the Chandogya Upanishad, which lists nonviolence as a virtue.

=== Medieval period ===
By the 10th century, the Purushamedha was included in lists of Kali-varjyas, or actions which were prohibited for the Kali Yuga. This suggests that human sacrifice had become obsolete by the time the texts were composed. However, it also suggests that the Purushamedha may have in some cases consummated with the actual sacrificing of a human. That is, the existence of inclusion of the prohibition in the list of Kali-varjyas demonstrates that at least one author seriously feared the possibility that a ritual practitioner might take the description of the ritual as a moral license to perform the rite to the extent of murder and cannibalism. This is a plausible reason to include it in the list of Kali-varjyas, even if it was a purely symbolic ceremony during the period of the composition of the Śatapatha Brāhmaṇa.

== Performance in Hindu epics ==
The Aitareya Brahmana tells the story of a sacrifice carried out by King Harischandra. The childless king asked Varuna to provide him with a son, and in return, Varuna asks him to sacrifice the child to him. Harischandra delays the performance of the sacrifice and allows his son, named Rohita, to grow older. Eventually, Rohita wanders into the forest to find a substitute for himself. He comes across a poor Brahmin named Ajigarta, who sells his son Sunahsepa to him. Sunahsepa is bound to the stake, but he frees himself by reciting some mantras that were taught to him by Vishvamitra. This story is reproduced in the Bhagavata Purana.

== In Vedanta and the Puranas ==
Human sacrifice and cannibalism are explicitly condemned in the Bhagavata Purana (5.26.31). The Chandogya Upanishad (3.16) states that the Purushamedha is actually a metaphor for life itself, and it compares the various stages of life to the oblations that are offered. The Mahabharta section XXII of the Sabha Parva in the Jarasandha-Badha Parva when the evil king Jarasandha is doing a human sacrifice. Sri Krishna states, "But you, O king, treating other kings with cruelty, seeks to offer them as sacrifice unto the god Rudra! O son of Vrihadratha, this sin committed by you may touch even us, for as we are virtuous in our practices, we are capable of protecting virtue. The slaughter of human being as sacrifice unto the gods is never seen. Why dost you, therefore, seek to perform a sacrifice unto god Sankara by slaughtering human beings? You are addressing persons belonging to your own order as animals (fit for sacrifice)!", which is yet another example of Hindu scripture berating human sacrifice. It is unclear if such sacrifice was their and is now condemned or if it never existed.

== Views ==
Helmer Ringgren regarded that the traces of Purushameda are not clearly detectable.

Dayananda Sarasvati, founder of Arya Samaj had rejected all human sacrifices and animal sacrifice in vaidika yajnas.

In November 2000, a modern version of Purushamedha was organised by All World Gayatri Pariwar at Shantikunja Haridvara, marking the completion of 12 year Yugsandhi Mahapurascharana. In this program, named Srijana Sankalpa Vibhuti Mahayajna, participants had to tie themselves with Yupas and take an oath to dedicate their life to social causes as a sacrifice. Yajnas was performed on 1551 kundas on the bank of the Ganga river and was attended by four million devotees.

== See also ==
- Historical Vedic religion

== Sources ==
=== Printed sources ===
- Knipe, David M. (2015), Vedic Voices: Intimate Narratives of a Living Andhra Tradition, Oxford: Oxford University Press
- Parpola, A. 'Human Sacrifice in India in Vedic Times and Before' in Bremmer, J.N. (2007): The Strange World of Human Sacrifice, Peeters
