= Maricha =

Rakshasa (demon) in Ramayana

In the Hindu epic Ramayana, Maricha, or Mareecha (Sanskrit: मारीच, IAST: Mārīca), is a rakshasha, who was killed by Rama, the hero of the epic and an avatar of Vishnu. He is mentioned as an ally of Ravana, the antagonist of the epic. His most notable exploit is his role in the kidnapping of Sita, Rama's wife.

Cursed to be a rakshasa along with his mother Tāṭakā and brother Subahu, Maricha initially led his life terrorizing sages. He was defeated by Rama at the behest of the sage Vishvamitra. He tried again to kill Rama, but had to run for his life again. Ultimately, Maricha assumed the form of a golden deer and helped Ravana kidnap Sita.

== Legend ==
=== Early life ===
Maricha was the son of the demon Sunda (son of Jamba or Jharjha) and a Yakshini named Tataka, also known as Taraka, Tadaka or Thataka. Tataka was the daughter of the yaksha king Suketu, who had gained her as a blessing from the god Brahma. Maricha also had a younger brother called Subahu. The siblings were very handsome and noble in character. They became skilled in sorcery. Once, Sunda attacked the ashram (hermitage) of the sage Agastya in an intoxicated state. The angry Agastya burnt him by his meditative powers. When Tataka learned of Sunda's death, she and her sons attacked Agastya to wreak vengeance on the sage. The sage cursed Tataka, Maricha and Subahu, transforming them into wicked, hideous, demonic Rakshasas.

Tataka and her sons then went to Patala (the underworld) to seek aid from Sumali, the patriarch of the Rakshasas. Sumali took them to his grandson, Ravana, the Rakshasa king of Lanka. Ravana helped the trio capture the states of Malada and Karusha, situated on the banks of the river Sarayu (may be on confluence of rivers Mahananda and Kalindri) near its confluence with the Ganges. The trio destroyed the states and turned them into a dense forest, which became known as the forest of Tataka. They terrorized the people, devouring anyone who dared venture into that forest. The gods, demons and men, as well as even the sun and the clouds did not dare to enter the territory of Tataka and her sons. Maricha and Subahu liked to harass the sages (rishis) in the region and destroy their yajna sacrifices. The brothers threw blood, flesh, and bones on the sacrificial altars and destroyed the sanctity of the sacrifices of the sages.

=== Facing Rama at Vishvamitra's yajna ===
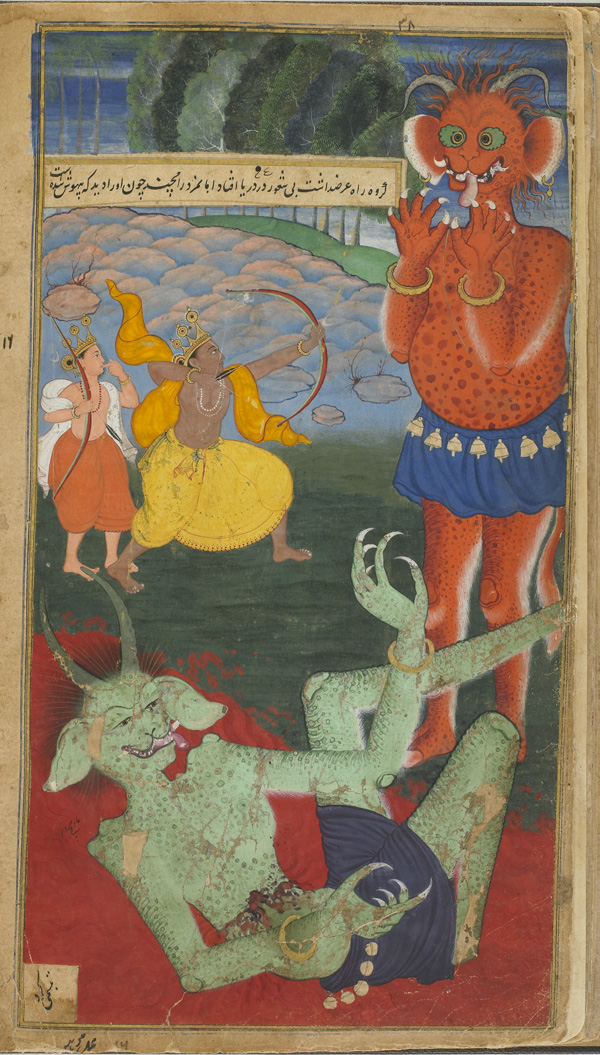
Rama and Laksmana Confront the Demons Maricha and Subahu.

The great sage Vishvamitra was living in the area near the forest of Tadaka and was doing penance and yajna with his disciples, and being tormented by Tadaka and her sons. Unable to tolerate the menace any longer, Vishvamitra approached Dasharatha, the King of Ayodhya for help. He requested Dasharatha to send his eldest son, Rama to protect his yajna. Though Dasharatha was initially reluctant to send his 16-year-old boy, he finally sent Rama and his younger brother Lakshmana with Vishvamitra on the advice of the royal guru Vashishtha. Vishvamitra trained them in warfare and taught them various mantras.

When Vishvamitra and the princes were passing through the forest of Tadaka, Tadaka attacked them. Rama, aided by Lakshamana, slew her with his arrow. Vishvamitra blessed Rama, as the gods rejoiced in the end of Tadaka. The sage gave him divine weapons as a reward. Vishvamitra then began his six-day yajna, with the princes standing on guard.

While the first five days passed without incident, on the sixth day the sacrificial fire suddenly faltered, indicating trouble. Maricha and his brother Subahu, with a horde of rakshasas, appeared from the treetops like black clouds, roaring and making a thunderous noise. They tried to destroy the yajna fire by showering it with blood and flesh. Rama fired his Astra (weapon) Manavastra (which could hit a target miles away) from his bow. The arrow struck Maricha's chest and threw him a hundred leagues away, into the ocean. In another version, Maricha fled to the ocean just by hearing the sound of Rama's bow. Subahu and the other demons were killed by Rama, using various other weapons. The sacrifice was completed successfully. Later on, under the guidance of Vishvamitra, Rama weds Sita, the adopted daughter of Janaka and the princess of Mithila.

=== Encounter with Rama in Dandakaranya ===
Rama, Lakshmana and Sita were exiled for a period of fourteen years from the kingdom by Dasharatha at the behest of Rama's stepmother Kaikeyi. The trio traveled south from Ayodhya and passed through the Dandakaranya (Dandaka forest) to the banks of the Godavari River where they built a hermitage at Panchavati.

Maricha recalls the following incident when talking with Ravana. However, it does not appear as a separate event in the chronological telling of the Ramayana. Maricha returned to Dandakaranya and disguised himself as a beast with a flaming tongue and two sharp horns. He was accompanied by two rakshasas in the form of animals. They feasted on human flesh and traveled to pilgrimage sites, terrorizing ascetics. They would kill ascetics and drink their blood. Once, Maricha saw Rama, Lakshmana and Sita. Remembering his last encounter, Maricha attacked them in his ferocious beast form to seek vengeance with his demonic companions. Rama shot three arrows at once, killing Maricha's allies, but the third arrow narrowly missed Maricha, who fled in fear.

The spared Maricha was transformed into a saintly person. He lived a life of an ascetic. He set up an ashram, grew matted hair and wore tree bark. He gave up his demonic qualities and started to realise his mistakes and became a devotee of Rama by then. At last he will die at the hands of Rama according to Ravana's strategy.

=== Role as the golden deer ===
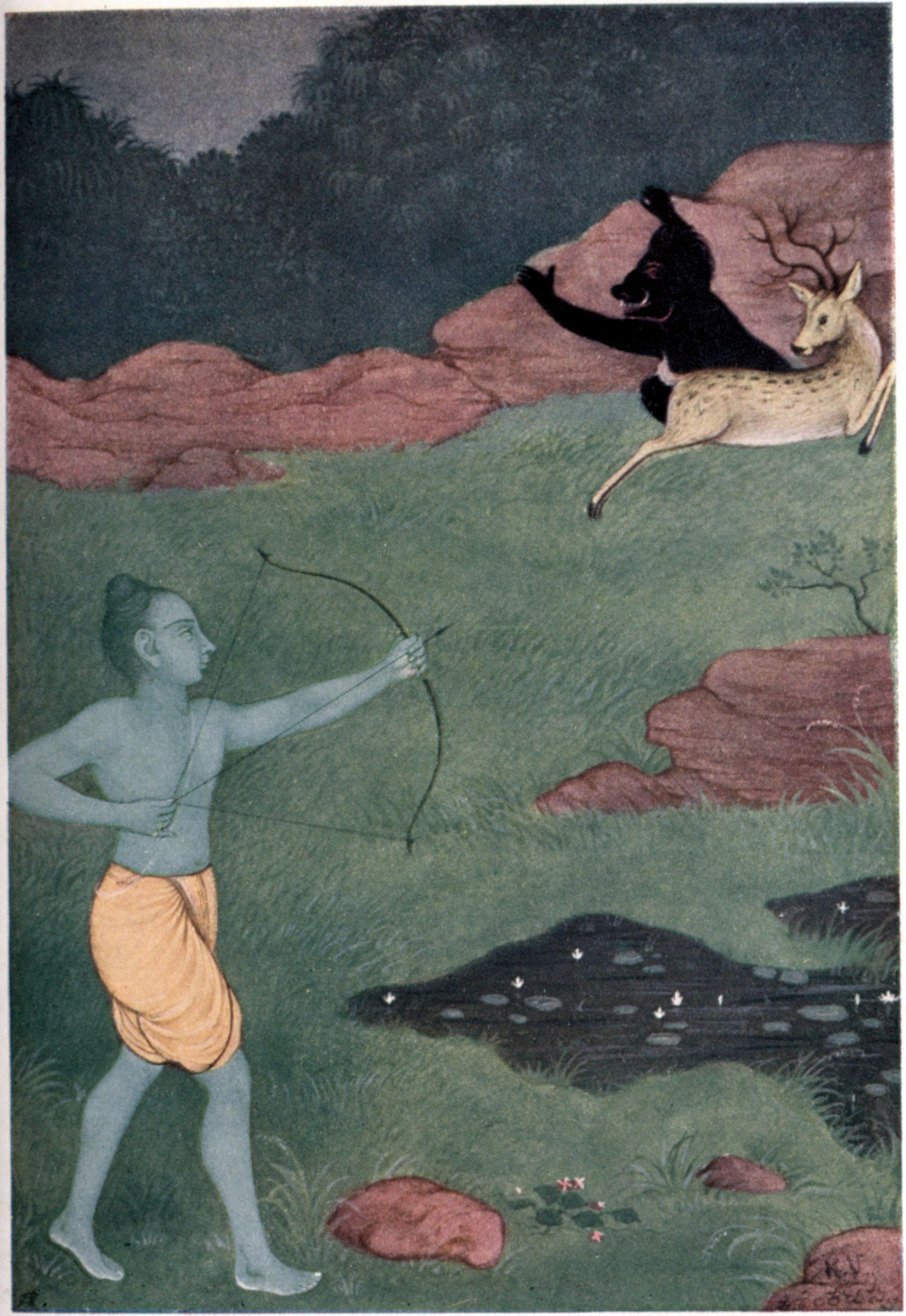
The Death of Maricha

One day, Surpanakha, the rakshasa sister of Ravana, disguised herself as a beautiful maiden and proposed marriage to Rama. Rama refused her proposal and directed her to Lakshmana in jest. Lakshmana joked that she should marry his master Rama. An angry Surpanakha returned to Rama and attacked Sita. But Lakshmana took out his sword and cut off Shurpanakha's ears and nose. The humiliated Surpanakha approached Khara, a man-eating rakshasha, to avenge her with a vendetta against Rama. However, Khara, his general Dushana and his army of 14,000 were killed by Rama when they attacked him. Surpanakha and her maternal uncle, Akampana, who escaped the carnage, reached Lanka with the news and proposed that Ravana steal Sita, Rama's beautiful wife.

Ravana started brooding and thinking of his next course of action. He then flew in his aerial chariot across the sea to meet his ally, Maricha. Maricha lived in a secluded hermitage on the ocean coast. Ravana informed Maricha of the death of Khara, Dushana and their army as well as of the insult of Surpanakha. He told Maricha to turn into a golden deer with silver spots and graze in the vicinity of Rama's ashram. On seeing the deer, Sita would surely tell Rama and Lakshamana to catch it. When the brothers left Sita alone, Ravana would abduct her. Rama, saddened by the grief of Sita's separation, would be easily killed by Ravana. Maricha, who had a first-hand experience of Rama's strength, was horrified by the idea. The wise Maricha attempted to dissuade Ravana by recalling the righteousness and valor of Rama and warned that this idea would only lead to the doom of Ravana, Lanka and the rakshasa race. He narrated his first encounter with Rama, when he underestimated Rama and dismissed him as a boy, how he was thrown hundreds of leagues away by Rama's single arrow. He followed that with the story of his second encounter with Rama in Dandakaranya.

However, Ravana ignored Maricha's words and asked how he dared praise Rama and question the prowess of Ravana, his king. Ravana announced that he would abduct Sita with or without Maricha's help to get revenge for the death of rakshasas. He reiterated his plan and told Maricha to be the golden deer. If successful, he and Maricha would return to Lanka and Ravana would grant half his kingdom to Maricha. Ravana threatened that while his plan might lead to Maricha's death by Rama, Maricha's refusal would mean an instant death at his, Ravana's, hand. Finally Maricha agreed, but not before prophesying his death as well as the end of Ravana, Lanka and rakshasas and warning Ravana that he would suffer the results of dismissing Maricha's words, which were for his own good. Another version states that Maricha felt that death by the divine Rama would be better than one by Ravana. Ravana was pleased by Maricha's consent and embraced him.

Maricha and Ravana then flew to Panchavati in Ravana's chariot and stopped close to the ashram of Rama. Maricha then assumed the form of a beautiful golden deer, which had silver spots and glowed with many gems like sapphire, moonstone, black jet and amethyst on its body. Maricha began grazing in the vicinity of Rama's ashram so that Sita would catch a glimpse of him. As soon as the animal-eating rakshasa Maricha entered the forest in the form of a deer, the other animals smelt something was wrong and ran away in fear. Maricha found Sita collecting flowers and ran in front of her. The golden luster of the deer which was gamboling around the hermitage lured Sita, who was awestruck and called Rama and Lakshmana to see the spectacular animal.

On seeing the wondrous deer, Lakshmana sensed foul play and suggested that the deer was an illusory form of Maricha, who preyed on kings who came into the forest for hunting. Sita persuaded Rama to get her the deer, dead or alive. If caught, she said it could be bred as a pet and taken back to Ayodhya as remembrance of their 14 years exile. Rama said that this deer would die at his hands that day to comply with Sita's wish, or, if it was a magical rakshasa like Maricha – who killed kings and harmed sages – as Lakshmana had said, then too it was his duty to kill the beast. Rama decided to go after the deer and slay it and asked Lakshmana to take care of Sita in the meantime.

Maricha ran, followed by Rama. Maricha led Rama far away from the hermitage, which made Rama very angry. After a long chase, the tired deer stopped in a shady grassland. Rama seized the opportunity and shot it down with his golden arrow. When the dying Maricha was returning to his real form he cried out, "Oh Sita! Oh Lakshmana!", mimicking Rama's voice. Sita fell prey to the ruse and asked Lakshmana to go and search for Rama. When Lakshmana insisted that no one could harm Rama, Sita – still very much worried – implored, and then ordered Lakshmana to go. Lakshmana reluctantly left to look for Rama. With Lakshmana gone, Ravana appeared as a mendicant (Sadhu) and kidnapped Sita as she stepped forward to give him alms. The Ramayana then narrates the tale of how Rama defeats Ravana in Lanka and regains Sita.

== In popular culture ==
In 2026, Maricha was portrayed by Saurabh Sachdeva in the film, Ramayana: Part 1.

== Bibliography ==
- Sehgal, Sunil (1999). Encyclopaedia of Hinduism. Sarup & Sons. pp. 45–50, 146–161. ISBN 978-81-7625-064-1.
- Pāṇḍuraṅgārāva, Ãi (1994). Valmiki: Makers of Indian Literature. Sahitya Akademi. p. 72. ISBN 978-81-7201-680-7.
- Pollock, Sheldon (2007). The Ramayana Of Valmiki: Aranyakanda. The Ramayana Of Valmiki: An Epic Of Ancient India. Vol. 3. Motilal Banarsidass. ISBN 978-81-208-3164-3.
