= Ramayana: Part 1 =

2026 Indian film by Nitesh Tiwari

- Theatrical release poster
- Directed by: Nitesh Tiwari
- Screenplay by: Shridhar Raghavan; Nitesh Tiwari
- Dialogue by: Shreyas Jain; Nitesh Tiwari
- Based on: Ramayana by Valmiki
- Produced by: Namit Malhotra; Yash
- Starring: Ranbir Kapoor; Yash; Sai Pallavi; Ravi Dubey; Shobana
- Cinematography: Pankaj Kumar; Mahesh Limaye
- Edited by: Huzefa Lokhandwala
- Music by: Hans Zimmer; A. R. Rahman
- Production companies: Prime Focus Studios; Monster Mind Creations; DNEG
- Distributed by: see below
- Release dates: 27 October 2026 (Academy Museum); 5 November 2026 (India)
- Running time: 195 minutes
- Country: India
- Language: Hindi
- Budget: ₹2,000 crore
- Box office: ₹1,732.08 crore (Note: The film has grossed ₹1,032.83 crore in India and ₹784.83 crore in overseas market.)

Ramayana: Part 1 (Note: Released as Namit Malhotra's Ramayana with the tagline "Our Truth. Our History" in India and as Ramayana: Rise of a Legend with the tagline "Mankind's Greatest Story Comes To Life" worldwide.) is a 2026 Indian Hindi-language epic mythological film directed by Nitesh Tiwari, who co-wrote the screenplay with Shridhar Raghavan. Produced by Namit Malhotra and Yash, the film is based on the Hindu epic Ramayana by Valmiki. It is the first instalment of a two-part film series, with Part 1 being based on the first three kāṇḍa (chapters) of Ramayana, which chronicle the life of Prince Rama from childhood up to his adventurous 14-year exile. The first part features an ensemble cast that includes Ranbir Kapoor, Yash (in his Hindi film debut), Sai Pallavi, Ravi Dubey (in his film debut), Anupam Kher, Shobana, Kajal Aggarwal, Rakul Preet Singh, Vivek Oberoi, Kunal Kapoor, Adinath Kothare, Arun Govil, Indira Krishnan, and Lara Dutta.

The project was announced in May 2017 as a live-action adaptation of Valmiki's Ramayana, initially conceived as a trilogy by producers; following several years of development and script refinement, it was restructured as a two-part film series under Tiwari's sole direction. Hans Zimmer and A. R. Rahman collaborated to compose the score, marking Zimmer's debut work in the Indian film industry. Filming began in April 2024 at Film City, Mumbai, and continued until July 2025. With an estimated combined budget of the duology being ₹4,000 crore (US$430 million), it is the most expensive Indian film ever made and the most expensive non-English language film ever made.

Ramayana: Part 1 premiered at the Academy Museum of Motion Pictures on 27 October 2026, and was released worldwide on 5 November. The film received mixed-to-positive reviews from critics. (Note: Quoting DNA India, "Ranbir Kapoor, Sai Pallavi, Yash-starrer Ramayana Part One has opened with positive reviews and mega hype."; Quoting The Economic Times, "The film opened to positive reviews from audiences and critics alike."; Quoting The Indian Express, "Namit Malhotra’s Ramayana: Part 1 has finally hit theatres, earning largely positive reviews."; Quoting Cinema Express, "Nitesh Tiwari's Ramayana hit theatres on Thursday to mixed to positive reviews from critics."; Quoting The Free Press Journal, "Well, the film is mostly getting positive reviews, but Ranbir's performance has received mixed reviews from critics and the audience."; Quoting BBC News, "But the critical response so far has been mixed."; Quoting NDTV, "Nitesh Tiwari's Ramayana Part One, which hit the screens on November 5 ahead of Diwali, received mixed reviews from audiences and critics."; Quoting The Times of India, "With the international review embargo now lifted, early reactions have been mixed, with some critics praising its scale and visual spectacle while others have raised questions about its characterisation and execution.") It is the second highest-grossing Hindi and Indian film of 2026, the third highest Hindi domestic net earner, the third highest-grossing Hindi film of all time and the fifth highest grossing Indian film of all time. A sequel is scheduled to release in 2028.(*as Per the latest report)

== Plot ==
The power-seeking Asuras have long been in conflict with the Devas. Led by Indra and blessed by the god Vishnu, the Devas defeat the Asuras, led by Sumali and his daughter Kaikashi. As the Devas rule over Lanka, Kaikashi urges her son Dashanan to avenge their defeat.

Dashanan undertakes years of penance and meditation until the creator god Brahma intervenes. When Brahma rejects his request for immortality, Dashanan instead asks for invincibility against all supernatural beings, which Brahma grants. Returning to Lanka, Dashanan single-handedly defeats the Devas and claims the throne as King Ravana. He then launches a bloody campaign to conquer the realms of the universe. After learning that Ravana had not sought invincibility against humans, Indra appeals to Vishnu for help. Vishnu descend in the form of human avatar as Prince Rama in Ayodhya.

In Ayodhya, Rama is born to Kaushalya, one of King Dasharatha's three wives. He grows to be a virtuous bachelor and is well-trained in the martial arts, eventually becoming the most favored among Dasharatha's four sons. Vishvamitra seeks Dasharatha's help in defeating Tataka and Subahu, two rakshasas (demons) who disrupt sacrificial rites. Rama volunteers and is accompanied by his loyal half-brother Lakshmana, with whom he defeats the rakshasas. At Vishvamitra's advice, Rama travels to Mithila, where he successfully lifts the Pinaka (Shiva's bow) during a royal swayamvara, although he breaks it while attempting to string it. This feat secures him the hand of Princess Sita in marriage. On their journey, Rama encounters another Vishnu avatar, Parashurama, who challenges him to a duel for breaking the Pinaka. Recognizing Rama's divine prowess, Parashurama relinquishes the Sharanga (Vishnu's bow) to Rama and remarks that his era ends and Rama's begins.

The elderly Dasharatha tells Rama of his desire to crown Rama as his successor. Manthara, the maidservant of Kaikeyi (one of Dasharatha's wives), persuades her mistress to invoke a promise the king made upon their marriage: that her son would inherit the throne. Kaikeyi demands that her son, Bharata, succeed Dasharatha and Rama to be exiled for fourteen years. Bound by filial duty and dharma, Rama renounces his claim to the throne and departs for the wilderness along with Sita and Lakshmana. Dasharatha subsequently dies of grief. Bharata visits Rama in the forest and implores him to return to Ayodhya and assume the throne, but Rama refuses. Bharata reluctantly agrees to govern the kingdom in his brother's stead. Meanwhile, Ravana kills his brother-in-law Vidyutjiva in a duel and subsequently commands his widowed sister Shurpanakha to find another husband.

After encountering rakshasas along their journey, Rama, Sita, and Lakshmana settle in the forest of Panchavati (under Ravana’s territory). They are visited by Shurpanakha, who becomes enamoured with Rama. After disguising as Sita and failing to seduce him, she attempts to attack Sita, but Lakshmana intervenes and slashes her face. In retaliation, her brother, Khara with an army of 14,000 rakshasas attacks the trio, but Rama defeats them using his divine powers. When news of the incident reaches Ravana, he vows to avenge Shurpanakha's humiliation and destroy Rama, despite warnings that Rama is avatar of Vishnu.

The rakshasa Maricha approaches the trio's camp disguised as a beautiful deer, captivating Sita, who asks Rama to capture it. Suspecting that the deer is a rakshasa diversion, Rama leaves Sita under Lakshmana's protection and pursues Maricha. Upon being caught, Maricha mimics Rama's voice and cries out for Lakshmana's help. Alarmed, Sita prepares to leave the camp, but Lakshmana assures her that Rama is capable of defending himself and offers to go to his aid. Before departing, he draws a magical boundary around the camp to keep rakshasas out.

With both Rama and Lakshmana away, Ravana approaches the camp disguised as an ascetic seeking alms. Sita tests his knowledge by asking him to recite a line from the Rigveda. As a great scholar of the Vedas, Ravana recites it correctly and eventually lures Sita out of Lakshmana's protective boundary. He then abducts Sita and takes her toward Lanka. Along the way, the vulture demigod Jatayu attempts to rescue her but is fatally wounded by Ravana. Rama and Lakshmana later find the dying Jatayu, who reveals Sita's abduction and warns them of Ravana's immense power and his followers. After burning Jatayu in a funeral pyre, a grief-stricken but resolute Rama vows to rescue Sita and destroy Ravana once and for all.

In the mid-credits scene, Hanuman emerges and chants Rama's name.

== Cast ==
- Ranbir Kapoor in a dual role as
  - Rama
    - Dhaniksh Dadhich as young Rama
  - Parashurama (special appearance)
- Yash as Ravana / Dashanan (voice dubbed by Sharad Kelkar)
  - Ayrton Malhotra as young Dashanan
- Sai Pallavi as Sita (voice dubbed by Ami Trivedi)
  - Rhyah Narasimhan as young Sita
  - Kiara Sadh as child Sita
- Ravi Dubey as Lakshmana
  - Samar Birje as young Lakshmana
- Sunny Deol as Hanuman (cameo appearance)
- Arun Govil as Dasharatha
- Anupam Kher as Jatayu
- Lara Dutta as Kaikeyi
- Shobana as Kaikasi
- Rakul Preet Singh as Shurpanakha
  - Dishita Sehgal as young Shurpanakha
- Vivek Oberoi as Vidyutjeehva
- Kajal Aggarwal as Mandodari
- Harish Uthaman as Vibhishana (voice dubbed by Rajesh Khattar)
- Indira Krishnan as Kaushalya
- Sonal Jha as Sumitra
- Rajiv Kumar as Janaka
- Adinath Kothare as Bharata
  - Vidhaan Sharma as young Bharata
- Nitish Sharma as Shatrughna
  - Hridansh as young Shatrughna
- Kunal Kapoor as Indra
- Suhail Nayyar as Sugriva
- Sheeba Chaddha as Manthara
- Shishir Sharma as Vasishtha
- Ajinkya Deo as Vishvamitra
- Mukesh Tiwari as Agastya
- Raghav Juyal as Meghanada (cameo appearance)
- Sonia Balani as Urmila
  - Divisha Manchhani as young Urmila
- Riya Kapoor as Mandavi
  - Hazel Shah as young Mandavi
- Surabhi Das as Shrutakirti
  - Purvi Mishra as young Shrutakirti
- Faisal Malik as Kumbhakarna
  - Hridyansh Gokani as young Kumbhakarna
- Parminder Chhada as Subahu
- Saurabh Sachdeva as Maricha
- Kanchan Chetal as Tataka
- Sujay Shankarwar as Kubera
- Chetan Hansraj as Sumali
- Geeta Agarwal Sharma as Anasuya

== Production ==
=== Origins ===
In May 2017, producers Allu Aravind, Namit Malhotra, and Madhu Mantena announced their plans to collaborate and adapt the Hindu Sanskrit epic Ramayana into a live-action feature film trilogy. They revealed that the development of the script had already been underway for nearly a year. It was envisioned as a multilingual production in Hindi along with several Indian regional languages and English. It was planned to be shot in 3D. Allu Aravind stated that his ambition was to bring Ramayana to the big screen in the "most magnificent way possible", while acknowledging that adapting the epic into a trilogy was an immense responsibility. Namit Malhotra, whose company Prime Focus had contributed visual effects to major Hollywood films like Star Wars, Transformers, X-Men: Apocalypse and The Martian until then, saw in the trilogy the potential to set new global benchmarks for Indian cinema. In February 2018, Mantena revealed that his inspiration to make the film series came from the life and work of Indian comic book writer Anant Pai, who had created the Amar Chitra Katha comics. He added that the film series was their collective effort in retelling Indian culture to newer generations in all possible "audio visual glory", with the help of the latest technology and visual effects. As the last widely recognised adaptations of the epic had been the television series, Ramayan (1987–88) by Ramanand Sagar, the producers stated that they wanted to adapt Ramayana for theatrical release.

=== Development ===
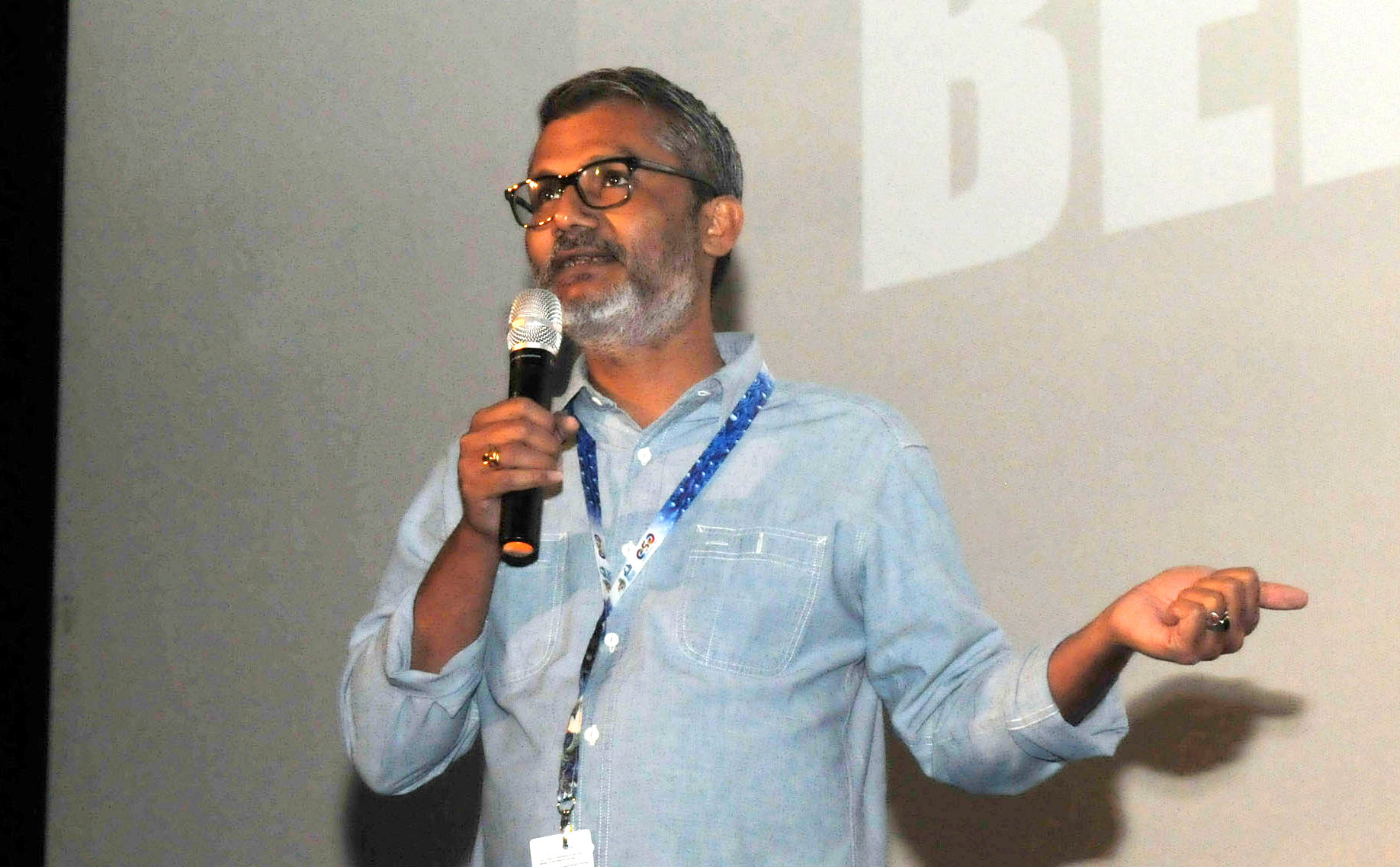
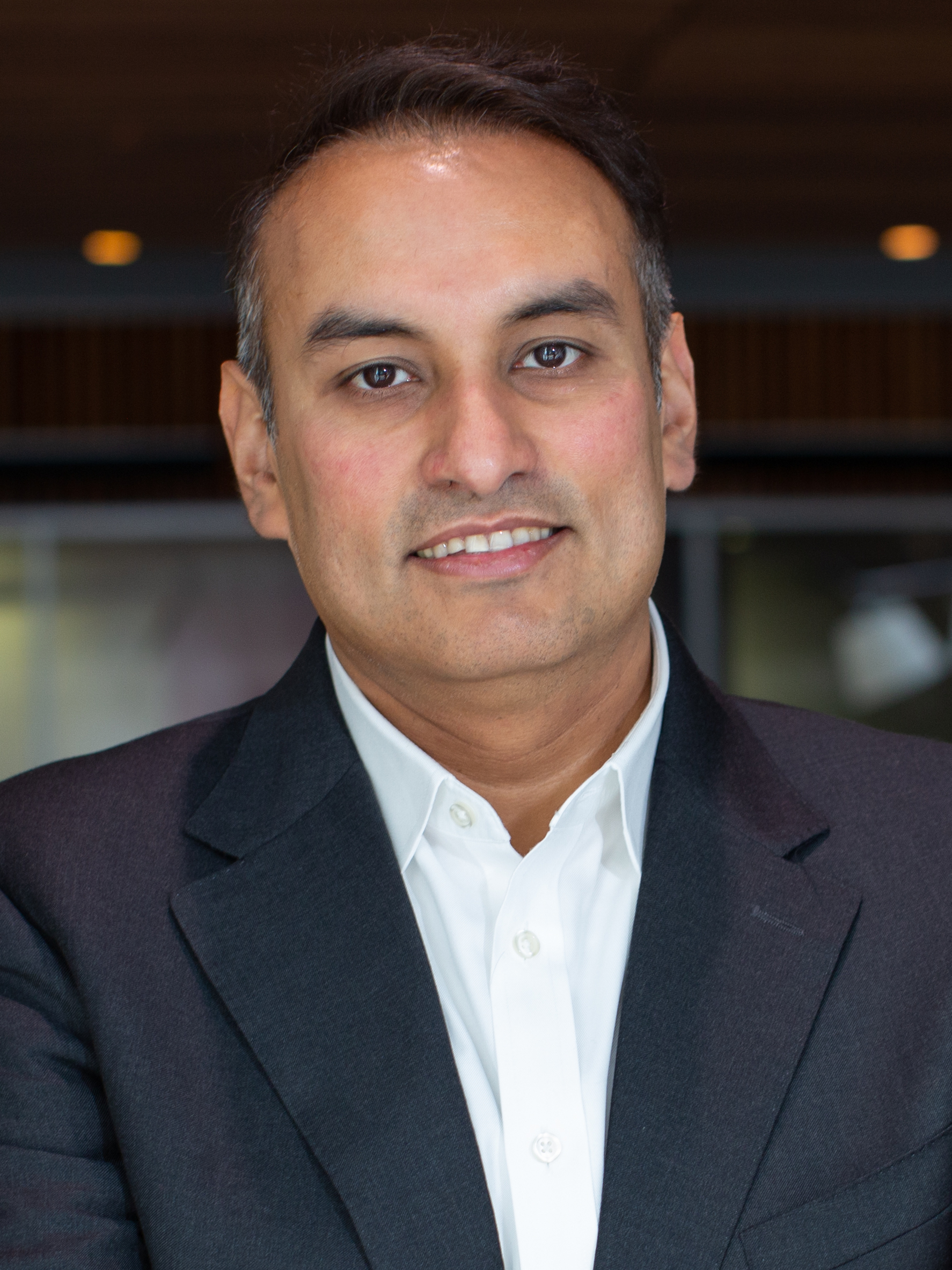
Ramayana is the first collaboration of Nitesh Tiwari and Namit Malhotra.

In July 2019, Tiwari and Ravi Udyawar came on board to co-direct the trilogy, while Shridhar Raghavan was hired to write the screenplay. Tiwari and Udyawar said they were motivated to undertake the project out of a sense of responsibility toward introducing the epic to their children, who, according to Tiwari, were familiar with the broad outline of the Ramayana but had not engaged with it in depth. Tiwari further cited the significant advancements in visual effects since the 1987–88 Ramayan television series as another factor behind the project. The producers planned to commence filming by 2020 and maintain a relatively short gap between the release of each part. The first instalment was scheduled to be released in 2021. The production team commissioned paintings by artists from across India to serve as references for the films' settings, costumes, character designs and action sequences. The project also aimed to cast actors from different regional film industries to appeal to pan-Indian and international audiences.

=== Pre-production ===
In November 2019, Tiwari said that Raghavan had been writing the screenplay for the past three years under the guidance of scholars and pandits with expertise in the scriptures and epic, to ensure that the adaptation remained culturally accurate while making it accessible to contemporary audiences. In April 2020, Tiwari stated that they were carefully identifying aspects of the story that should remain unchanged while determining where limited cinematic liberties could be taken without affecting the epic's cultural and religious significance. Tiwari further added that the team sought to make the film appealing to younger audiences while remaining faithful to the expectations of audiences familiar with traditional retellings. He also described the project as technologically demanding because of its extensive visual effects requirements, citing the epic's fantastical settings and creatures as presenting opportunities for large-scale world-building. During the COVID-19 pandemic in India, the development of screenplay continued through virtual meetings involving members of the creative team across the country.

In June 2021, Mantena said that the trilogy was being developed as a long-term project, revealing that more than 200 artists from around the world, including several Academy Award winners, had been working on it for two years using a production process inspired by Avatar. The following month, he described the trilogy as a linear adaptation of Valmiki's Ramayana that would incorporate many of the epic's subsidiary narratives while extensive digital assets were being created during pre-production. In September 2021, Mantena said that the filmmakers were primarily drawing from Valmiki's Ramayana while also studying artistic interpretations by painters such as Raja Ravi Varma, emphasising that the project was intended to be a traditional adaptation rather than a reinterpretation of the epic. In December 2022, Mantena said that the screenplay was expected to be completed within a few months, with principal photography planned to begin in September 2023. In June 2023, he dismissed reports that the project had been indefinitely postponed, stating that filming was expected to begin later that year. In March 2024, it was reported that DNEG virtual production had come on board as the producer alongside Mantena. In the same month, it was reported that Mantena had stepped back from his role as a producer citing financial concerns. He later got involved in a legal tussle with Malhotra's Prime Focus Technologies regarding the IP rights of the film, which was ultimately settled when he was provided compensation of ₹80 crore. Later, in April 2024, it was confirmed that Yash through his company Monster Mind Creations was co-producing the film alongside Malhotra.

=== Casting ===
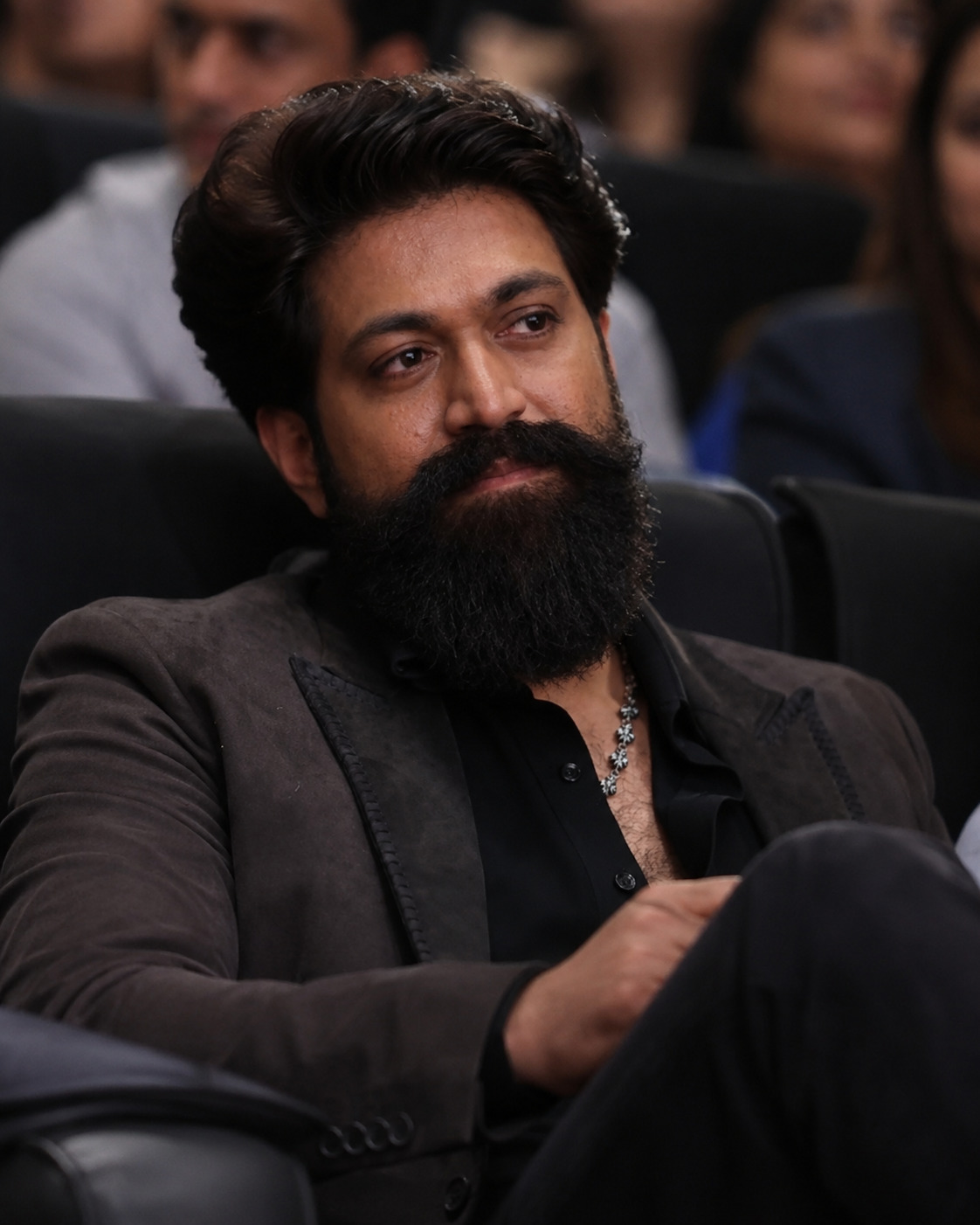
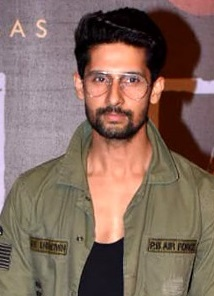
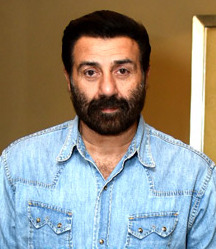
Ranbir Kapoor, Yash, Sai Pallavi and Ravi Dubey with Sunny Deol portrayed Ram, Ravan, Sita, Lakshman, and Hanuman respectively.

In July 2021, Mantena said that the ensemble cast would be announced by Diwali later that year. He stated that the film would feature what he described as "the biggest cast ever in the history of Indian cinema" and that actors would be drawn from across the country, saying the casting reflected the filmmakers' intention to present the epic as a pan-Indian project. Mukesh Chhabra was announced as the casting director for the film. In August 2023, Ranbir Kapoor and Yash joined the film for the roles of Rama and Ravana respectively. Later, Kapoor was confirmed to play the dual role of Rama as well as Parashurama. In the same month Sai Pallavi joined the cast for the role of Sita. In October 2023, Sunny Deol also joined the cast for the role of Hanuman. He reportedly charged ₹45 crore for his role. In early 2024, Vijay Sethupathi was rumoured to play the role of Vibhishana in the film, however later he declined these rumours. Similarly, Bobby Deol was also reportedly rumoured to play the role of Kumbhakarna which also turned false. In February 2024, Rakul Preet Singh reportedly joined the cast for the role of Shurpanakha. In March 2024, Ravi Dubey also reportedly joined the film for the role of Lakshmana. In April 2024, Arun Govil, Lara Dutta and Sheeba Chaddha were also confirmed to be part of the film after images leaked from the sets confirmed their presence. In July 2024, Kunal Kapoor was confirmed to play an important role in the film. In September 2024, Indira Krishnan also joined the cast. In May 2025, Kajal Aggarwal joined the cast for the role of Mandodari. Vivek Oberoi joined the cast in June 2025 while Adinath Kothare and Shobana joined the cast in July 2025. Amitabh Bachchan was initially rumoured to voice the character of Jatayu, however Anupam Kher was later confirmed to be cast instead. In March 2026, Faisal Malik was confirmed to play the role of Kumbhakarna. Harish Uthaman reportedly joined the cast for the role of Vibhishana while Raghav Juyal was reported to play the role of Meghanada.

Originally, Yash and Sai Pallavi's own voices for Ravana and Sita were used in the first official Hindi trailer of the film, respectively. However, since neither actor is a native Hindi speaker, their dialogue attracted attention from viewers. Yash's pronunciation and vocal impact as Ravana was criticised, while Sai Pallavi's Hindi received mixed responses. The second Hindi trailer featured a new voiceover for Ravana, with Sharad Kelkar subsequently confirming that he dubbed Yash's Hindi dialogue. Kelkar explained that the filmmakers' decision to dub over Yash was due to his Kannada accent affecting the rhythm of his Hindi dialogue. Yash nonetheless dubbed his own dialogue in the Kannada dub. Ami Trivedi provided Pallavi's Hindi voice, consulting the actress and matching the emotional nuances of her performance.

=== Filming ===
In January 2024, reports indicated that Kapoor and Pallavi were expected to begin filming in March 2024, with dialogue-heavy scenes scheduled first, followed by large-scale crowd and battle sequences. In March, filming was reportedly postponed to April to allow additional time for the completion of costumes and production design. Principal photography for the first part began on 2 April 2024, in Film City, Mumbai, under the working title God Power. The opening schedule featured gurukula sequences involving the child actors portraying the four princes of Ayodhya and Shishir Sharma as Vasishtha, with a specially constructed Ayodhya set serving as the primary filming location. On 5 April 2024, pictures from the sets, featuring pictures of actors Arun Govil, Lara Dutta and Sheeba Chaddha and director Tiwari, were leaked onto social media and went viral. Due to this, the makers imposed a strict no-phone policy on the movie sets. On 27 April 2024, pictures of Kapoor and Pallavi were leaked from the sets. On 30 April 2024, the second schedule commenced in Mumbai. Yash was a part of the schedule, with Pallavi, Kapoor and Deol reportedly joining later. In August 2024, Terry Notary confirmed that he was working as the action director. In May 2025, Guy Norris, known for his work on Furiosa: A Mad Max Saga and The Suicide Squad, was announced as the film's stunt director for its large-scale action sequences and was closely working with Yash to accomplish the same. Principal photography for the first part wrapped by 1 July 2025.

=== Post-production ===
The film was reportedly in post-production for 600 days. Visual effects were handled by DNEG who also co-produced the film.

== Music ==
The film score and soundtrack are composed by Hans Zimmer and A. R. Rahman, marking Zimmer's debut work in Indian cinema. Rahman had described the creative process as "terrifying" and "complicated" due to the epic's cultural significance, noting that the duo is working to blend Zimmer's soundscapes with traditional Indian elements. The score features the integration of Sanskrit verses, which Rahman added to the initial thematic soundscapes developed by Zimmer. Additionally, poet and lyricist Kumar Vishwas contributed lyrics inspired by the film's narrative. Karthik Netha adapted the lyrics in Tamil, Rakendu Mouli in Telugu, Vinayak Sasikumar in Malayalam and Karthik Saragur in Kannada.

In July 2026, T-Series acquired music rights to both parts of the film in a deal worth around ₹75 crore. The first single titled "Jai Jai Ram" was released on 14 September 2026, coinciding with Ganesh Chaturthi. The second single titled "Ravana Tandav" was released on 20 October 2026, coinciding with Dussehra. The full album was released at the event held on 21 October 2026 in Chennai Trade Centre, Nandambakkam.

== Marketing ==
On 6 November 2024, Malhotra officially announced Ramayana: Part 1 and Part 2 through a poster, along with the release windows for both films. Malhotra had repeatedly marketed the project as a global film, presenting an Indian subject but for the world. The first glimpse titled "Ramayana: The Introduction" was released online on 3 July 2025 and screened in nine Indian cities for fans. In Mumbai, Malhotra and Tiwari paid a special surprise visit to the audience and interacted with them as well. On 26 March 2026, coinciding with Ram Navami, the makers announced the next phase of the film's promotional campaign, with the first glimpse of Kapoor as Rama was released on 2 April 2026, coinciding with Hanuman Jayanti. Ahead of its public release, the makers held private preview screenings of the glimpse in the United States to promote the film internationally. The first screening took place at an IMAX theatre in Burbank, California, on 30 March 2026, attended by Kapoor, Tiwari and Malhotra. A second screening, followed by a question-and-answer session with the filmmakers, was held in New York City on 31 March 2026. During this event, Tiwari discussed the casting of Kapoor, citing the character's restrained nature, compassion, and physicality as key considerations. At the CinemaCon 2026 event in Los Angeles, Malhotra said that the film would combine elements of fantasy and human drama from films like The Lord of the Rings and Gladiator.

On 18 July 2026, an event, titled "Pratham Sankalp" was held in Bharat Mandapam, New Delhi where the film's official trailer was exclusively showcased. Following the event, a short clip from the trailer was leaked on various social media platforms. The trailer was also showcased in the San Diego Comic Con on 23 July. The next day on 24 July, the trailer was set to be released worldwide on all digital platforms however it was delayed. Later, the official trailer was released digitally on 30 July 2026. On 5 August 2026, an English version of the trailer with lip-synced performances using Brahma AI was released with some minor tweaks to selected shots. In the same month, an exclusive 15 minutes of footage from the film was shown at the Big Cine Expo 2026 in Chennai. On 26 September 2026, a pre-release event took place in Mumbai which was attended by YouTuber MrBeast as part of a strategic global marketing campaign. On 28 September 2026, the makers released a behind-the-scenes video of Kapoor's transformation as Rama, thus coinciding with his 44th birthday. An international trailer was released on 15 October 2026 at a special event in Bengaluru. The event was attended by the film's main cast and crew alongside Malhotra. On 19 October 2026, a pre-release event was held in JRC Convention Center in Hyderabad. At the event Malhotra revealed his plans of converting the duology into a franchise and further into a larger cinematic universe. On 20 October, another pre-release event was held in Kolkata where the film was declared tax-free by CM Suvendu Adhikari. Later, Kapoor, Pallavi and Dubey also went to Kaun Banega Crorepati to promote the film alongside Amitabh Bachchan. On 1 November 2026, a special screening of the film took place in London. On 3 November, special media screening took place across Mumbai. Several media and press screenings were held across Delhi and Mumbai on 4 November.

== Release ==
=== Theatrical ===
Ramayana: Part 1 premiered at the Academy Museum of Motion Pictures in Los Angeles on 27 October 2026. It was theatrically released on 5 November 2026. It was initially planned to release in India two days later on 8 November, coinciding with Diwali; however, Sony Pictures Entertainment announced the 6 November worldwide release date in early September. Later, the release date was preponed by a day. It served as the first instalment of a planned two-part epic. It was released in multiple languages with IMAX presentations as part of a large-scale global rollout. The film was reportedly released across 59,000 screens worldwide, including 50,000 screens in overseas markets and 9,000 screens in India. In China, the film will reportedly release under the title Ramayana: The Legend of the Prince. It became the first Indian film to be released in the ScreenX format. In the overseas regions, the film was released under the title Ramayana: Rise of a Legend.

The film will reportedly release in China, Russia, Japan and South Korea in the first quarter of 2027.

=== Distribution ===
In July 2026, Dharma Productions acquired the film's North Indian theatrical distribution rights for around ₹250 crore (US$27 million). Later, Sony Pictures Releasing acquired the overseas theatrical distribution rights. Sri Venkateswara Creations acquired the theatrical distribution rights for Andhra Pradesh and Telangana, while AVA Productions and E4 Entertainment acquired the theatrical distribution rights for Kerala. Think Studios acquired the theatrical distribution rights for Tamil Nadu, while Yash's company, Monster Mind Creations, acquired the theatrical distribution rights for Karnataka.

=== Home media ===
Following its theatrical run, the film will begin streaming in India on JioHotstar through a pay-per-view model.

== Reception ==
=== Box office ===
Ramayana – Part I grossed ₹1,732.08 crore worldwide. It grossed ₹947.25 crore in India and ₹784.83 crore in overseas market. On its opening day, the film earned ₹62.47 crore net at the domestic box office, and ₹121.62 crore gross worldwide. By the end of its opening weekend, the film had grossed over ₹500 crore worldwide. The global opening weekend gross was $55.7 million, only behind Godzilla Minus Zero, with $22.83 million earned from overseas markets, the highest overseas opening for any Hindi film in 2026. Speaking about the film's box office performance, Malhotra had noted that if the film did not recover it's cost through theatrical run, there would be other means such as merchandising to do so.

The film is the fourth highest grossing film in India domestically and the sixth highest-grossing Indian film in overseas markets.

=== Critical response ===
Publications described the critical consensus as either positive, "largely positive", mixed to positive, or mixed. (Note: Attributed to multiple references) On the review aggregator website Rotten Tomatoes, 78% of 58 critics' reviews are positive, with an average rating of 6.7/10. Metacritic, which uses a weighted average, assigned the film a score of 58 out of 100, based on nine critics, indicating "mixed or average" reviews. Sneha Biswas commented that the film received "largely positive" reviews from audiences. Audiences surveyed by PostTrak gave the film an 86% positive score, with 75% saying they would definitely recommend it.

Critics noticed influences in the film from Leonardo da Vinci, William Shakespeare, Raja Ravi Varma, Terry Gilliam, Amar Chitra Katha, steampunk films, Marvel films (particularly X-Men), The Ten Commandments, The Lion King, Princess Mononoke, Gladiator, Crouching Tiger, Hidden Dragon, The Lord of the Rings, Jack the Giant Slayer, Mad Max: Fury Road, KGF, Sirāt, Game of Thrones and Ramanand Sagar's Ramayan. (Note: Attributed to multiple references) While Kapoor's portrayal was contrasted with his performance in Animal, and the visual effects were compared to that of Avatar, the film itself drew comparisons with RRR, Adipurush, The Odyssey, two episodes of Bharat Ek Khoj based on Bhasa's interpretation of the Ramayana, and the 1950s and 60s American films. (Note: Attributed to multiple references) Reviewers identified the film variously as an action-adventure, a fantasy, a maximalist film, a mythological film, a revenge tragedy, or an epic melodrama. (Note: Attributed to multiple references)

Tiwari knew "when to let the spectacle take over and when to step back and allow the emotions to do the talking", believed Filmfare. Though, while conceding that the celestial sequences looked "truly sublime", Sukanya Verma found the "scenery and sentiment" of his vision as "strictly synthetic". For The National, the sincerity of the storytelling held "something refreshing" about it. In contrast, the screenplay struggled to give its characters and parallel threads enough emotional depth, which made the storytelling feel uneven, stated Outlook. Verma characterised Kumbhakarna as lacking "personality and voice", and most of his ilk as "one-note growlers solely existing to be bumped off". Though The Hindu, on the other hand, thought that Ravana had a "deeply textured character arc".

India Today wrote that Kapoor didn't "overplay the emotional scenes", nor did he "lose his energy" when the action demanded it. In contrast, Verma declared his portrayal as bland, robotic and soulless, "restrained to the point of tense". Taran Adarsh commended Pallavi for bringing "dignity and strength" to her "naturalistic performance". Though Verma pointed out her impassive response regarding her abduction and the fate of Jatayu. For India Today, Kapoor and Pallavi's chemistry developed organically. Though Outlook characterised the songs as often taking the place of conversations "that could have revealed more about their connection", making their chemistry lack the emotional depth the film needed.

Despite his repetitiveness, Yash's performance didn't slip into monotony for Verma. Though The Hindu lamented the fact that the shades associated with the great scholar "are reduced to one scene". Dubey's eyes coveyed "a thousand emotions", and the clarity with which he delivered his dialogue was sharp, for India Today. Though for The Hindu, he played his role with a "self-conscious awareness" that he was merely a "second fiddle". Dutta was "bang on" and Chaddha cast a "lasting impression" on Hindustan Times, and Singh appeared first-rate to Adarsh. Verma, however, found all three to do "precious little" with their roles. Oberoi niftily conveyed the "haughtiness of his character", for her. Though for The Hindu, he took it to the "melodrama of yore".

The score was found to give the film an "almost spiritual dimension" by India Today, particularly during the action sequences and larger than life moments, making several scenes "feel considerably bigger than what is unfolding on screen". In contrast, Saibal Chatterjee felt that it could have done more by imparting "greater depth and range" to the key characters. While India Today believed the songs to have found their footing once they were woven into the film's narrative, The Hindu found them functioning as a "polished technical exercise rather than an emotional anchor". To RogerEbert.com, the action sequences seemed either "poorly showcased or negligibly choreographed". The National, on the other hand, considered the film to contain some of the best action choreography seen in Indian cinema. Similarly, for Adarsh, production design created a world that stood "shoulder to shoulder with the best of global cinema". Though The Hindu believed that the historically and culturally nuanced landscape of Ayodhya and Lanka "demanded more layering" than the film eventually offered. Hindustan Times proclaimed that the visual effects of the film can "truly stand up to any Hollywood film". To RogerEbert.com though, the special effects sequences were "lifeless and neither productive nor compellingly surreal". The runtime was "completely justified" owing to the "brisk pace" of the film, for Filmfare. While Chatterjee was wore down when a surfeit of "surface gloss" led to monotony and overwhelmed the story.

== Sequel ==
A sequel, Ramayana: Part 2, is scheduled for release during Diwali 2028, having initially been announced for Diwali 2027. Principal photography for the second part began in March 2026 in Mumbai. In November 2026, Namit Malhotra confirmed the postponement, explaining that the filmmakers required additional time to complete the film given its scale. The new release window was also announced in the end credits of Part 1.
