= Madhuchhanda =

Sage in Hinduism

Madhuchchhanda

Personal life
- Children: Aghamarsana and Jeta
- Parent: Vishvamitra (father)

Religious life
- Religion: Historical Vedic religion
- Composed (1-10) Hymns in Mandala 1, Hymn 1 in Mandala 9 of Rigveda

Madhuchchhanda (Sanskrit: मधुच्छन्दाः, romanized: Madhucchandāḥ), also known as Madhushchandas Vaishvamitra, is a sage mentioned in Hindu literature. A number of hymns in Rigveda are composed by him. He is one of the sons of the sage Vishvamitra. Madhuchchhanda is regarded to have had a mastery over Vedic literature and was also a great singer.

== Literature ==
=== Rigveda ===
Madhuchhanda was the seer of the hymn to the god of fire, Agni, with which the Rigveda begins. He is attributed as the seer of the first ten hymns in the Mandala 1 of Rigveda.
