= Bhumanyu =

King in Hinduism

- Predecessor: Bharata
- Successor: Suhotra
- Texts: Mahabharata

Genealogy
- Parents: Bharata (father), Sunanda (mother)
- Spouse: Puṣkariṇī
- Children: Diviratha, Suhotra, Suhotā, Sukavi, Suyaju, and Ṛcīka
- Dynasty: Chandravamsha

Bhumanyu (Sanskrit: भूमन्यु, romanized: Bhūmanyu) is a king of the Chandravamsha (Lunar) dynasty in Hindu literature. He is the son of Bharata, and the grandson of Dushyanta. Bhumanyu's lineage is featured in the Mahabharata.

== Legend ==
The Mahabharata offers two different origins of Bhumanyu's birth: The first legend says that Bharata married Sunanda, the daughter of Sarvasena, the king of the Kashi kingdom, and received from her a son named Bhumanyu. According to another legend, Bhumanyu was born out of a yajna that Bharata performed under the instructions of the sage Bharadvaja.

In the epic, after Bhumanyu reached the age of maturity, his father Bharata entrusted him with the affairs of his kingdom. Bhumanyu had six sons by his wife Puṣkariṇi; Diviratha, Suhotra, Suhotā, Sukavi, Suyaju, and Ṛcīka. Bhumanyu was succeeded by his son, Suhotra.
