= Mūtiba =

Ancient people in the Deccan

Mūtiba (Sanskrit: Mūtiba, Mūvīpa, and Mūcīpa; Latin Modubae) was an ancient tribe of south-central South Asia whose existence is attested during the Iron Age.

== Location ==
The precise location Mūtibas is yet uncertain. The Roman author Pliny located them between the "Modogalingae," (likely Mudgagiri or Maudgalyana, ie Munger) who lived on a large island in the Gaṅgā, and the Āndhras, and associates them with the Molindae (Pulindas) and the Uberae (Savaras).

The name Mūcīpa, by which the Śāṅkhāyana Śrauta Sūtra calls the Mūtibas, might be connected to the name of the Musi river.

== History ==
The Mūtibas already existed as a tribe during the time of the Brāhmaṇas.
