= Ghritachi =

Celestial nymph in Hindu mythology

- Affiliation: Apsara
- Abode: Svarga
- Texts: Ramayana, Mahabharata, Puranas
- Gender: Female

Genealogy
- Children: Chitrangada and Nala (from Vishvakarma); Ruru (from Pranati); Vedavati or Devavati (from Parjanya); Ten sons of Raudrashva; A hundred daughters and a son, Gadhi (from Kushanabha); Drona and Shrutavati (from Bharadvaja); Shuka (from Vyasa)

Ghritachi (Sanskrit: घृताची, romanized: Ghṛtācī, lit. 'abounding in clarified butter') is a prominent apsara (celestial nymph) in Hindu mythology. She is known for her beauty and sexual relationships with many men, both divine and human, and for becoming the mother of their children.

== Literature ==
Ghritachi appears in many Hindu religious scriptures, including the epics, the Ramayana and the Mahabharata, as well as the Puranas. She is described to be belonging to the daivika (lit. 'divine') class of apsaras, and presides over Kumbha, a month in Indian lunisolar calendar. The scriptures describe her procilivity to seduce men, including rishis (sages), gandharvas (celestial musicians), devas (gods) and kings.

The Shiva Purana mentions Ghritachi once engaged in intercourse with Kama, the god of desire, before being separated by his preceptor Brihaspati. According to the Vamana Purana, Ghritachi once lived with Vishvakarma, the architect of the gods, and had a daughter named Chitrangada. Vishvakarma prohibits his daughter to marry anyone, due to which he is cursed to become a vanara (monkey) till a son is borne to him; Ghritachi liberates him by giving birth to Nala, who later helps the god Rama. The Brahma Vaivarta Purana attributes the origin of many mixed-caste to the children of Ghritachi and Vishvakarma.

Ghritachi also fell in love with the gandharva Parjanya and gave birth to a daughter, Vedavati (or Devavati). In the Ramayana, Ghritachi also temporarily became the wife of King Kushanabha, son of Ajaka, and gave birth to a hundred daughters, whom the god Vayu wanted to marry. Later, to beget a son, Kushanabha performed the ritual Putrakameshti Yajna and she gave birth to a son, Gadhi. Ghritachi also gave birth to the ten sons of King Raudrashva, who belonged to the Puru dynasty. The names of these sons were Riteyu, Kaksheyu, Sthaṇḍileyu, Kriteyuka, Jaleyu, Sannateyu, Dharmeyu, Satyeyu, Vrateyu, and Vaneyu. According to the Mahabharata, Ghritachi once seduced the sage Pramati, son of Chyavana, and mothered Ruru.

The Shanti Parva of the Mahabharata and Devi Bhagavata Purana narrate that the sage Vyasa is desiring an heir, but is reluctant to marry. Ghritachi takes the form of a parrot and appears in front of him. Seeing her, the sage emits his seed on a fire-stick and a son, Shuka, is born from it.

The Adi Parva of the Mahabharata also narrates that Ghritachi, while bathing in the river Ganges, is spotted by the sage Bharadvaja, who becomes sexually aroused after seeing her and involuntarily ejaculates into a basket. A son Drona—who later becomes the guru of the Pandavas and Kauravas— is born from it. The Shalya Parva reveals that a similar incident took place another time, this time leading to the birth of a daughter named Shrutavati.
