= Kusha =

Lunar dynasty king in Hinduism

- Successor: Kushanabha
- Issue: Kushambha; Kushanabha; Athurtharajas; Vasu
- Dynasty: Amavasu

Kusha (Sanskrit: कुश, romanized: Kuśa) is a Chandravamshi king in Hindu mythology. He was the father of Kushanabha (who later became Rajarshi Kushanabha).
