= Gādhi =

Sage in Hinduism

Personal life
- Children: Vishvamitra (son); Satyavati (daughter)
- Parents: Kushanabha (father); Ghritachi (mother)

Religious life
- Religion: Hinduism

Gādhi (Sanskrit: गाधि), also known as Gāthin, is a sage in Hinduism, best known for being the father of Vishvamitra. His father, Kaushika (known as Kushanabha in later mythology), was a Rigvedic rishi and the author of two hymns in Mandala 3 of the Rigveda. In later Hindu texts, he is described to be the king of Mahodayapuram, and also the father of Satyavati, the wife of Rcika.

== Literature ==
=== Rigveda ===
In the Rigveda Book 1 Hymn 10, it is said that Indra incarnated as the son of Kausika, who was Gadhi's father. Venerating Gadhi is said to bring, "Prolong our life anew, and cause the seer to win a thousand gifts".

=== Mahabharata ===
In the Shanti Parva of the Mahabharata, Kaushika began a penance for a son who would be equal to Indra and could not be killed by others. Pleased with his tapas, Indra is regarded to have been born as Kushika's son, Gadhi. He was a great monarch and had a son named Visvamitra.

=== Shiva Purana ===
In the Shiva Purana, when the Visvedevas arrive at Kailash, Shiva, requested by Vishnu, performed Vedic rites among other rituals, where the greatest sages of the world gathered. Gadhi was amongst them.
