= Bharata (Mahabharata) =

King in Hindu tradition

- King of the Lunar Dynasty
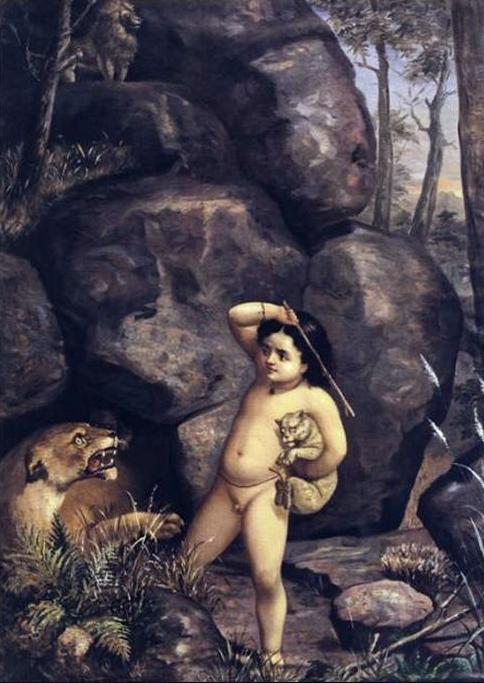
- Painting of Bharata, Raja Ravi Varma
- Predecessor: Dushyanta
- Successor: Bhumanyu
- Texts: Mahabharata

Genealogy
- Parents: Dushyanta (father); Shakuntala (mother)
- Spouse: Sunanda; Two unnamed wives
- Children: Bhumanyu; Bharadvaja (adopted)
- Dynasty: Chandravamsha

Bharata (Sanskrit: भरत, romanized: Bharata) is a legendary emperor featured in Hindu literature. He is a member of the Chandravamsha dynasty, and becomes the Chakravarti (Chakra possessing emperor). He is regarded to be the ancestor of the Pandavas, the Kauravas, Brihadratha and Jarasandha.

The legend of Bharata is featured in the Adi Parva of the Mahabharata, where he is mentioned as the son of Dushyanta and Shakuntala. The story of his parents and his birth is related in Kalidasa's famous play, Abhijñānashākuntala. He is a descendant of rajarshi Vishvamitra.

According to popular tradition, Bhārata, one of the traditional names of the Indian subcontinent, is named after Bharata.

Many depictions call him as Digvijaya Chakravartin Samrāj Sarvadamana Bharata (Sanskrit: दिग्विजय-चक्रवर्तिन्-सम्राज्-सर्वदमन भरत, romanized: digvijaya-cakravartin-samrāj-sarvadamana bharata, lit. 'The World-conquering Bharata, who is victorious wherever he goes, whose chariot wheels are always turning, who rules over Kings'; Sanskrit pronunciation: [d̪ɪg.ʋɪ.dʑɐˈjɐ tɕɐk.ɾɐ.ʋɐɾˈt̪ɪn̪ s̪ɐmˈɾɑːdʑ s̪ɐɾ.ʋɐ.d̪ɐ.mɐˈn̪ɐ bʰɐ.ɾɐˈt̪ɐ]).

== Legend ==
=== Mahabharata ===
The Mahabharata states that King Dushyanta was once hunting in the forests, when he arrived at the ashrama of Sage Kanva. In the sage's absence, his adoptive daughter, Shakuntala welcomed Dushyanta, who became smitten by her beauty. Shakuntala revealed the story of her birth- how she was raised by Sage Kanva after she was born from the union of the celestial nymph, Menaka, and Sage Vishvamitra. Dushyanta expressed his desire to marry Shakuntala, who consented on the condition that Dushyanta must crown the son born of their union the king. Dushyanta agreed and married Shakuntala according to the Gandharva marriage. Afterwards, Dushyanta left for his kingdom. Meanwhile, Sage Kanva learnt about Shakuntala's marriage to Dushyanta and revealed that she would give birth to an emperor. In due course, Shakuntala gave birth to Dushyanta's son and named him Sarvadamana, who had the sign of a Chakra on his right hand (indicating that he was destined to be an emperor). Sarvadamana was born with the strength of 10,000 elephants, and even as a child, he was capable of subduing and taming wild beasts. A few years later, Sage Kanva advised Shakuntala to take her son to Dushyanta. However, Shakuntala was taken aback when Dushyanta expressed unfamiliarity towards her and her son. However, a divine voice confirmed that Sarvadamana was indeed the son of Dushyanta and renamed the child as Bharata. Dushyanta admitted that he was aware of Bharata being his son, but did not acknowledge out of fear that people would doubt his paternity.

Eventually, Bharata became the king and conquered the world. The Drona Parva states that Bharata performed 1,800 Ashwamedha Yagnas, 100 Rajasuya Yagnas, and hundreds of Vajapeya Yagnas. Bharata's grandfather, Sage Kanva, officiated all his sacrificial rituals, and the emperor donated countless horses and 10 trillion gold coins to his grandfather. Bharata married three princesses of Vidarbha, though the sons born of these wives were so cruel that they were slain. Bharata propitiated the devas for a son, and they gave him a boy, whom he named Vitatha, also called Bharadvaja. According to another account, Bharadvaja blessed Bharata with a son named Bhumanyu. Bharata ruled for twenty-seven thousand years, and therefore, the kingdom that he inherited and expanded came to be known as Bhārata, named after him.

=== Abhijñānaśakuntalā ===
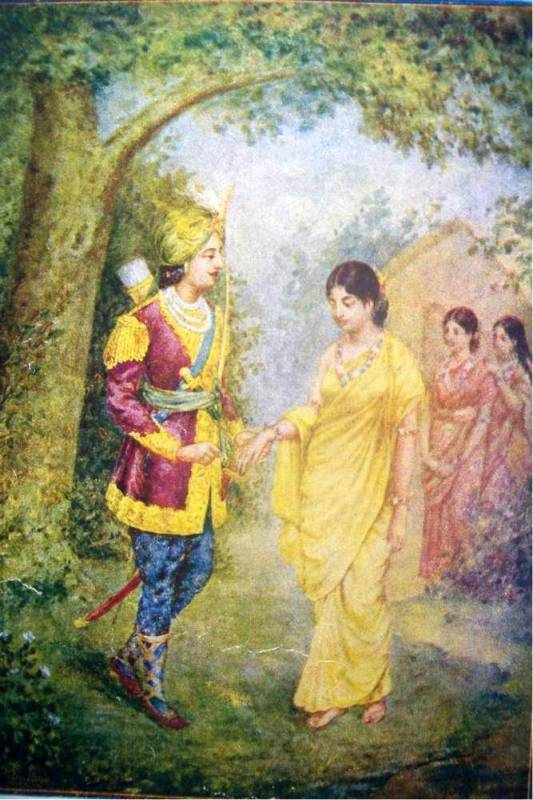
Dushyanta & Shakuntala in the Hindu epic Mahabharata. The son that resulted from their Gandharva marriage was named Bharata.

According to a dramatised version of the events by the poet Kalidasa, the king Dushyanta married Shakuntala on his hunting expeditions in forests. He was captivated by Shakuntala's beauty, courted her in royal style and married her. He then had to leave to take care of affairs in the capital. She was given a ring by the king, to be presented to him when she was ready to appear in his court. Shakuntala gave birth to her child who was named Sarvadamana by the sage Kashyapa. Surrounded only by wild animals, Sarvadamana grew to be a strong child and made a sport of opening the mouths of tigers and lions and counting their teeth.

=== Children ===
Bharata had a son named Bhúmanyu. The Adi Parva of Mahabharata tells two different stories about Bhúmanyu's birth. The first story says that Bharata married Sunanda, the daughter of Sarvasena, the King of the Kashi kingdom and begot upon her the son named Bhumanyu. According to the second story, Bharata had three wives, and nine sons from them. But these sons were not as their father and incapable of being his successor. Seeing Bharata's dissatisfaction, his wives in wrath slew all of their sons. Then Bhúmanyu was born out of a great sacrifice that Bharata performed with the help of the sage Bharadvaja.

The Skanda Purana gives another account of the adopted son of Bharata. When Angiras' son, Utathya's wife Mamata was pregnant, Utathya's younger brother Brihaspati moved by desire sought Mamata. But the child in her womb obstructed the deposition of Brihaspati's semen. Instead the child was delivered by Mamata. Mamata and Brihaspati started to quarrel over the guardianship of the child. At last they left the infant boy abandoned. The Maruta gods adopted the boy and named him Bharadvaja. When the wives of Bharata killed all their sons, the Marutas gave Bharadvaja to Bharata. Bharadvaja, also known as Vitatha, became the king.

== See also ==
- Bharatas (Vedic tribe)
- Bharata (Ramayana)
- Bharata (Jainism)
- Bharata (sage)
- Raghu
- Ikshvaku
- Yadu (legendary king)
