= Tataka =

Demoness from Hindu epic Ramayana

- Ramayana character
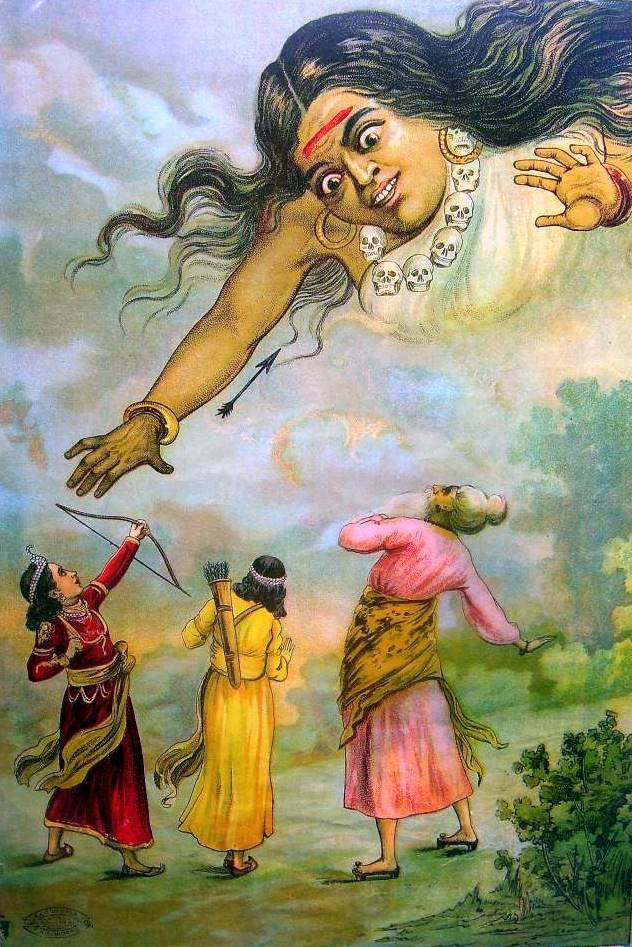
- Rāma Killing Tāṭakā, print by the Ravi Varma Press, c. 1910s

In-universe information
- Gender: Female
- Affiliation: Rakṣasa
- Family: Suketu (Father)
- Spouse: Sunda
- Children: Mārīca

Tāṭakā is a minor yakṣī antagonist in the Rāmāyaṇa. Along with her son, Mārīca, Tāṭakā would harass and attack sages performing yajñas in the forest. They were ultimately slain by Rāma and Lakṣmaṇa on behest of their teacher, Viśvāmitra.

== Rāmāyaṇa ==
In the Rāmāyaṇa, Viśvāmitra tells Rāma and Lakṣmaṇa the story of Tāṭakā when they reach a forest inhabited by her. Viśvāmitra states that a yakṣa named Suketu had undertaken austerities to obtain children, and was given a daughter with the strength of a thousand elephants named Tāṭakā, but not a son. When she became of age, she was married to Sunda, and gave birth to a son named Mārīca. After Sunda is killed, Tāṭakā and Mārīca attack the seer Agastya, who curses Mārīca to become a rākṣasa and curses Tāṭakā to become an ugly man-eater. Driven mad by the curse, she roams the region where Agastya used to live.

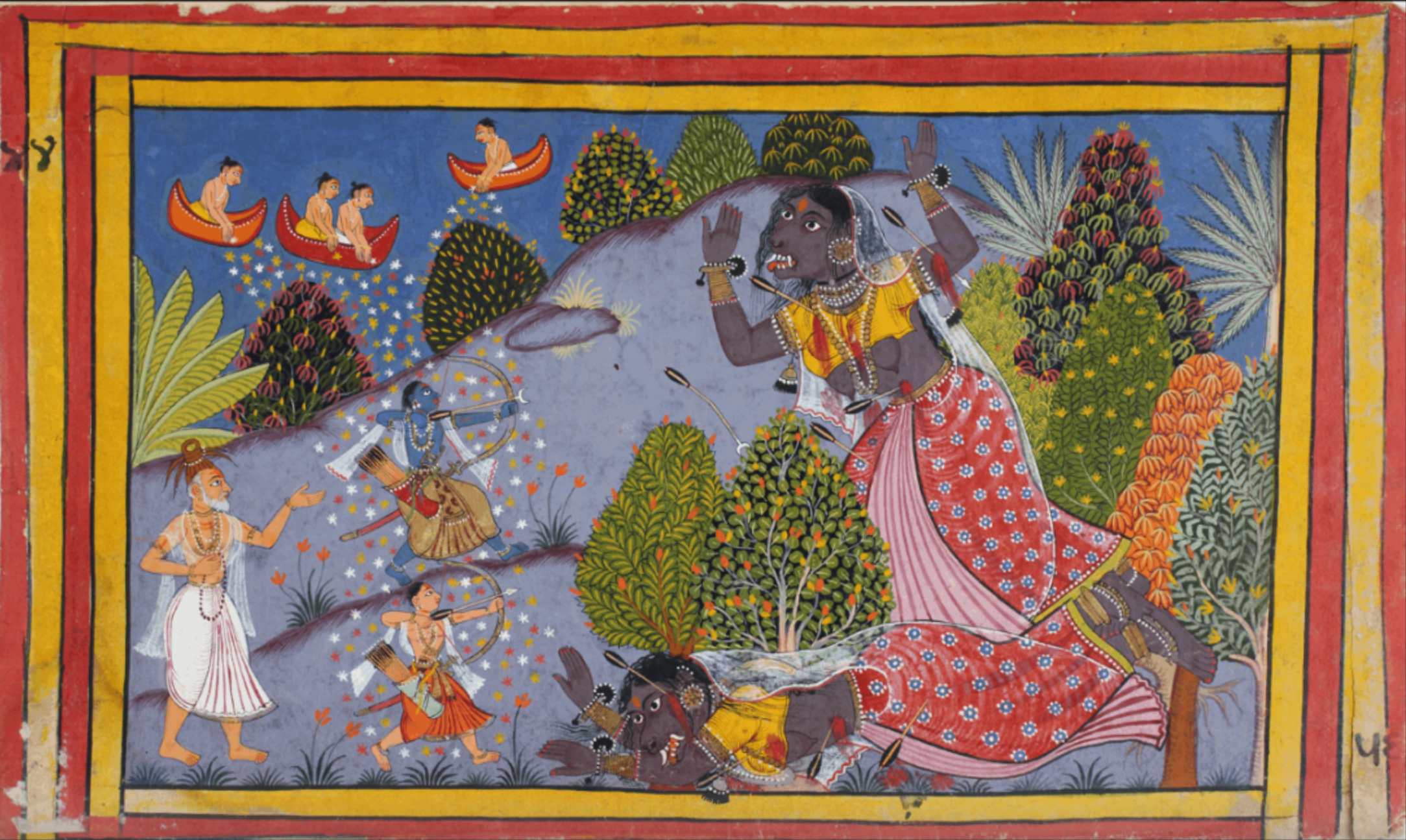
Rāma killing Tāṭaka from 17th century royal Mewar manuscript

The Critical Edition of the Vālmīki Rāmāyaṇa does not mention many details of the previous narrative, but later commentators and recensions have more fleshed out versions of the story. According to three traditional commentaries on the Rāmāyaṇa, Sunda is killed due to a curse by Agastya, which Bhandare states gives proper cause for Tāṭakā's seemingly unwarranted attack on Agastya. The southern recensions of the epic state that Tāṭakā (prior to become a man-eater) tries to eat Agastya. An undated Malayālam script recension states that Taṭakā is smitten after seeing Agastya: stating that she proceeds to strip naked and run towards him singing with love. According to Goldman, this Malayālam script recension preserves an important part of the Tāṭakā legend that was suppressed in the Vālmīki Rāmāyaṇa.

Viśvāmitra, after narrating Tāṭakā's past, instructs Rāma that he must kill Tāṭakā, and he should not have any compassion for her or disgust for killing a woman, and he recounts other occasions where unrighteous women were killed by moral men. Rāma agrees, stating the killing of Tāṭakā is uttamam "[an] eminently justifiable action". He twangs his bowstring, which attracts Tāṭakā to the scene. Rāma then states that he will not kill her on account of she being a woman, but vows to merely cut off her ears and nose and dispossess her of her strength and lair. Tāṭakā then charges Rāma, who proceeds to shoot and kill her with a single arrow to the chest.

Only in the southern recensions is the vow of Rāma cutting off Tāṭakā's ears and nose mentioned, and Rāma actually fulfils his vow in those recensions. The northern recensions neither mention the vow or its fulfillment, which leads Goldman to believe that the verses mentioning it are dubious.

== In popular culture ==
In 2026, Tataka was portrayed by Kanchan Chetal in the film, Ramayana: Part 1.
