= Angiras (disambiguation) =

Angiras is a Vedic sage who formulated the fourth Veda.

Angiras may also refer to:

- Angiras Ghora, identified by some scholars as Neminatha, twenty-second tirthankara in Jainism
- Angiras Brahmin, a caste in India

== See also ==
- Angira Dhar (born 1988), Indian actress
