= Kushanabha =

Hindu mythological king

- Texts: Ramayana, Puranas

Genealogy
- Parents: Kusha (father)
- Spouse: Ghritachi
- Children: Gādhi (son), Hundred unnamed daughters
- Dynasty: Amavasu - Chandravamsha

Kushanabha (Sanskrit: कुशनाभ, romanized: Kuśanābha) is a king featured in Hindu texts. He is described to be the king of the Amavasu dynasty and belongs to the Chandravamsha line. He is stated to be the son of Kusha. Kushanabha is believed to be the founder of the city Mahodaya (Regarded to be present-day Kannauj).

== Legend ==
=== Marriage ===
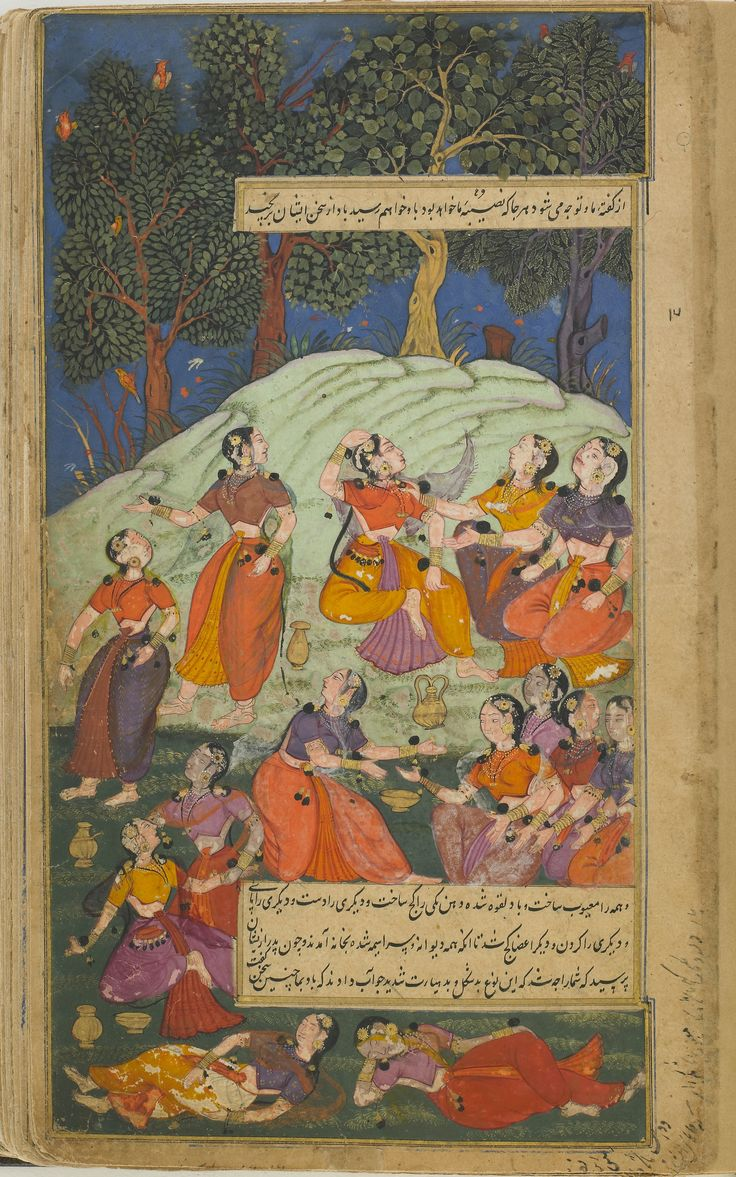
The hundred daughters of Kushanabha are tormented by Vayu, whose courtship they spurned

Gritachi was an accomplished dancer. Kushanabha was infatuated with her after seeing her dance. He married her and had 100 daughters with her. He married the 100 sisters to Brahmadatta, the founder of Kampilya and son of Chuli Rishi and the apsara Somada, in turn the daughter of the apsara Urmila.

=== Birth of Gadhi ===
Kushanabha had 100 daughters but no male successor to his throne. So, he started worshipping the deity Indra and performed austerities wishing to have a son like Indra. At last, Indra consented and became his son, by incarnation, being born as Gadhi.
