= Vishvamitra =

Ancient Hindu sage

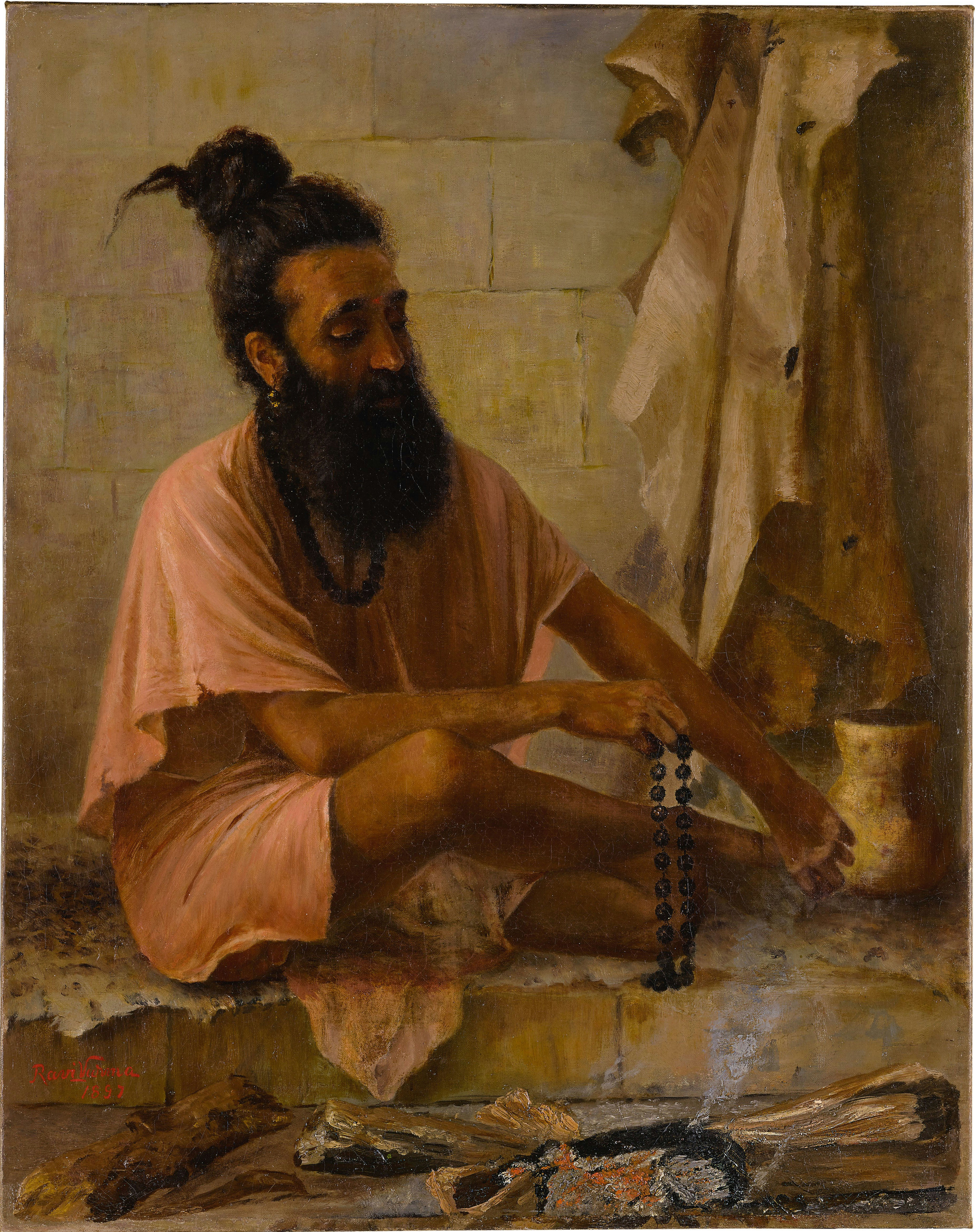
- Vishvamitra by Raja Ravi Varma
- Title: Brahmarishi, Rajarshi, Saptarshi

Personal life
- Born: Kanyakubja
- Children: Many children including Madhuchhanda, Ashtaka, Shunahshepa, Sushruta, and Shakuntala
- Parent: Gādhi (father)
- Notable work: Gayatri Mantra

Religious life
- Religion: Hinduism

Vishvamitra (Sanskrit: विश्वामित्र, IAST: Viśvāmitra) is a legendary figure in Hindu mythology, King of Kanyakubja, and one of the most venerated rishis or sages of ancient India. Vishvamitra is one of the seven Brahmarshi. According to Hindu tradition, he is stated to have written most of the Mandala 3 of the Rigveda, including the Gayatri Mantra (3.62.10). The Puranas mention that only 24 rishis since antiquity have understood the whole meaning of —and thus wielded the whole power of — the Gayatri Mantra. Vishvamitra is supposed to have been the first, and Yajnavalkya the last.

Before renouncing his kingdom and royal status, Brahmarishi Vishvamitra was a king, and thus he retained the title of Rajarshi, or 'royal sage'.

== Textual background ==
Historically, Viśvāmitra Gāthina was a Rigvedic rishi who was the chief author of Mandala 3 of the Rigveda. Viśvāmitra was taught by Jamadagni Bhārgava. He was the purohita of the Bharata tribal king Sudās, until he was replaced by Vasiṣṭha. He aided the Bharatas in crossing the Vipāśa and Śutudrī rivers (modern Beas and Sutlej). In later Hindu texts, Viśvāmitra and Vasiṣhṭha have a long-standing feud, and scholars have stated they historically had a feud regarding the position of the Bharata purohita. However, this view has been criticized due to lack of internal evidence and the projection of later views onto the Rigveda. In post-Rigvedic literature Viśvāmitra becomes a mythical sage.

Most of the stories related to Vishvamitra's life is narrated in the Valmiki Ramayana. Vishvamitra was a king in ancient India, also called Kaushika (descendant of Kusha) and belonged to Amavasu Dynasty. Vishvamitra was originally the King of Kanyakubja (modern day Kannauj). He was a valiant warrior and the great-grandson of a great king named Kushik. Valmiki Ramayana, prose 51 of Bala Kanda, starts with the story of Vishvamitra:

There was a king named Kusha (not to be confused with Kusha, son of Rama), a mindson (manasputra) of Brahma and Kusha's son was the powerful and verily righteous Kushanabha. One who is highly renowned by the name Gaadhi was the son of Kushanabha and Gaadhi's son is this great-saint of great resplendence, Vishvamitra. Vishvamitra ruled the earth and this great-resplendent king ruled the kingdom for many thousands of years.

His story also appears in various Puranas; however, with variations from Ramayana. Vishnu Purana and Harivamsha chapter 27 (dynasty of Amaavasu) of Mahabharata narrates the birth of Vishvamitra. According to Vishnu Purana, Kushanabha married a damsel of Purukutsa dynasty (later called as Shatamarshana lineage - descendants of the Ikshvaku king Trasadasyu) and had a son by name Gaadhi, who had a daughter named Satyavati (not to be confused with the Satyavati of Mahabharata).

== Life and legends ==
=== Birth ===
Satyavati was married to an old man known as Richika who was foremost among the race of Bhrigu. Ruchika desired a son having the qualities of a Brahmin and so he gave Satyavati a sacrificial offering (charu) which he had prepared to achieve this objective. He also gave Satyavati's mother another charu to make her conceive a son with the character of a Kshatriya at her request. But Satyavati's mother privately asked Satyavati to exchange her charu with her. This resulted in Satyavati's mother giving birth to Vishvamitra, a Kshatriya with qualities of Brahmin, and, Satyavati gave birth to Jamadagni, father of Parashurama, a Brahmin with qualities of a warrior.

=== Conflicts with Vasishtha ===
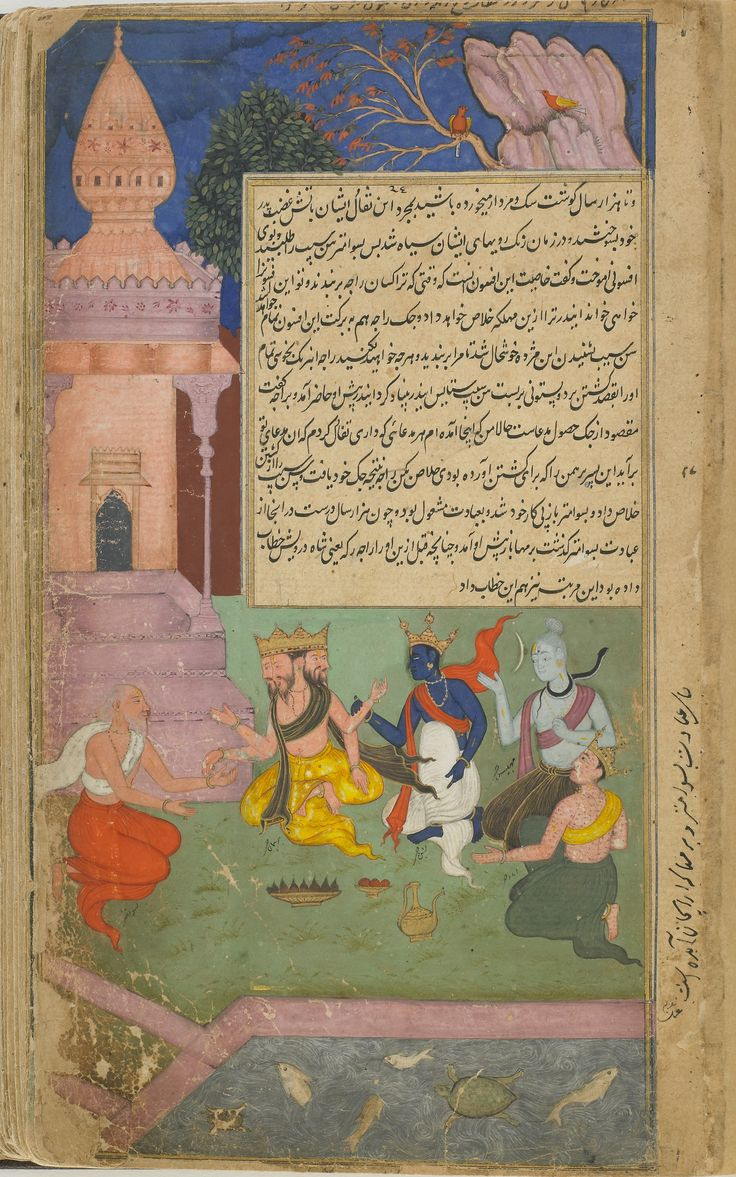
Vishvamitra is addressed as maharsis by Brahma and other gods alarmed by his austerities

Maharshi Vasistha possessed a divine-cow Kamadhenu that was able to give everything that one wished for. Once king Kaushika (Vishvamitra) saw the cow and wished to possess her. He asked Vasistha to hand her over but Vasistha refused to do so saying she actually belongs to Devas and not him. King Kaushika became angry due to his arrogance and attacked Vasistha with all his forces. However, he was defeated by the power of Vasistha's penance and Kamadhenu's created soldiers and was somehow rescued by Vamadeva. He asked Vamadeva how Vasistha could defeat him all alone. Vamadeva told him this happened due to Vasistha's position as "Brahmarishi" due to his tapasya (penance). Kaushika then wanted to gain "Brahmarishi" like Vasistha. Doing penance guided by Vamadeva, King Kaushika eventually became Vishvamitra.

In one encounter, Vishvamitra cursed the king Harishchandra to become a pauper. Vasishta accompanied him by becoming a bird himself to help him. There were several such instances of violent encounter between the sages and at times, Brahma, god of creation, had to intervene.

==== Alternative version ====
Vasishta destroys Vishvamitra's entire army by the simple use of his great mystic and spiritual powers, breathing the Om syllable. Vishvamitra then undertakes a tapasya for several years to please Shiva, who bestows upon him the knowledge of celestial weaponry. He proudly goes to Vasiștha's ashram again and uses all kinds of powerful weapons to destroy Vasishta and his hermitage. He succeeded in the killings of Vasistha's thousand sons but not Vasistha himself.

An enraged Vasistha brings out his brahmadanda, a wooden stick imbued with the power of Brahma. It consumes Vishvamitra's most powerful weapon, the brahmastra. Vasistha then attempts to attack Vishvamitra, but his anger is allayed by Devas. Vishvamitra is left humiliated while Vasistha restores his hermitage.

=== Seduction by Menaka ===
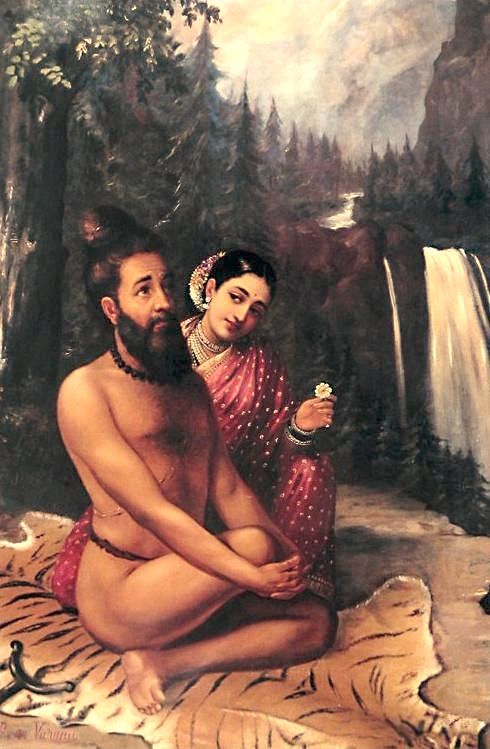
Vishvamitra is seduced by Menaka.

Menaka was born during the churning of the ocean by the devas and asuras and was one of the most beautiful apsaras (celestial nymph) in the world with quick intelligence and innate talent. However, Menaka desired a family. Due to his penance and the power he achieved through it, Vishvamitra frightened the gods and even tried to create another heaven. Indra, frightened by Vishvamitra's powers, sent Menaka from heaven to earth to lure him and break his meditation. Menaka successfully incited Vishvamitra's lust and passion. She succeeded in breaking the meditation of Vishvamitra. However, she fell in genuine love with him and a girl was born to them who later grew in Sage Kanva's ashram and came to be called Shakuntala. Later, Shakuntala falls in love with King Dushyanta and gives birth to a child called Bharata.

Kanva describes this tale in the Mahabharata:

And the timid and beautiful Menaka then entered the retreat and saw there Visvamitra who had burnt, by his penances, all his sins, and was engaged still in ascetic penances. And saluting the Rishi, she then began to sport before him. And just at that time Marut robbed her of her garments that were white as the Moon.

And she thereupon ran, as if in great bashfulness, to catch hold of her attire, and as if she was exceedingly annoyed with Marut. And she did all this before the very eyes of Visvamitra who was endued with energy like that of fire. And Visvamitra saw her in that attitude.

And beholding her divested of her robes, he saw that she was of faultless feature. And that best of Munis saw that she was exceedingly handsome, with no marks of age on her person.

And beholding her beauty and accomplishments that bull amongst Rishis was possessed with lust and made a sign that he desired her companionship. And he invited her accordingly, and she also of faultless features expressed her acceptance of the invitation. And they then passed a long time there in each other’s company.

And sporting with each other, just as they pleased, for a long time as if it were only a single day, the Rishi begat on Menaka a daughter named Sakuntala. And Menaka (as her conception advanced) went to the banks of the river Malini coursing along a valley of the charming mountains of Himavat. And there she gave birth to that daughter. And she left the new-born infant on the bank of that river and went away.

— Vyasa, Mahabharata, Section 72

However, later, Vishvamitra merely cursed Menaka to be separated from him forever, for he loved her as well and knew that she had lost all devious intentions towards him long ago.

After succumbing to Menakā's flirtations, and after having a daughter with her, Vishvamitra then travels south to the Godāvarī to resume his austerities, settling down at a spot next where Śiva stood as Kālañjara.

Vishvamitra was also tested by the Apsara Rambha. She, however, was also cursed by Vishvamitra.

=== Rise to Brahmarishi ===
After cursing Rambha, Vishvamitra goes to the highest mountain of Himalayas to perform an even more severe tapasya for over 1000 years. He ceases to eat and reduces his breathing to a bare minimum.

He is tested again by Indra, who comes as a poor Brahmin begging for food just as Kaushika is ready to break a fast of many years by eating some rice. Kaushika instantly gives his food away to Indra and resumes his meditation. Kaushika also finally masters his passions, refusing to be provoked by any of Indra's testing and seductive interferences.

At the penultimate culmination of a multi-thousand-year journey, Kaushika's yogic power is at a peak. At this point, Brahma, as the head of Devas led by Indra, names Kaushika a Brahmarishi and names him Vishvamitra or Friend of All for his unlimited compassion. He then goes to meet Vashishta. It was customary that, if a sage was greeted by an equal or superior person, the sage would also greet the person. If the sage was greeted by an inferior person, the sage would simply bless them. Initially, when Vishvamitra greeted Vashishta with the pride of being a new Brahmarishi in heart, Vashishta simply blessed him. Suddenly all pride and desire left Vishvamitra's heart and he became a clean and clear Brahmarishi. When Vishvamitra turned back to leave, Vashishta realised a change of heart and proceeded to greet Vishvamitra. Vishvamitra is also embraced by Vashista and their enmity is instantly ended.

=== Trisanku ===
Another story Vishvamitra is known for is his creation of his own version of Svarga or heaven, called Trisanku Svarga.

When a proud King Trisanku asked his Guru Vashista to send him to heaven in his own body, guru responded that the body cannot ascend to heaven. King Trisanku then asked Vashista's hundred sons to send him to heaven. The sons, believing that Trisanku should not come to them after their father had refused, took outrage and cursed Trisanku to be a Chandala. Trisanku was transformed into a person with body smeared of ash, clothed in black and wearing iron jewelry. Unrecognizable to his subjects, he was driven out of the kingdom.

In his exile, Trisanku came across the sage Vishvamitra, who agreed to help him. Vishvamitra organized a great sacrifice and ritual propitiating the Devas, pleading that they accept Trisanku into heaven. Not one Deva responded. Angered, Vishvamitra used his yogic powers and ordered Trisanku to rise to heaven. Miraculously, Trisanku rose into the sky until he reached heaven, where he was pushed back down by Indra.

Enraged even more by this, Vishvamitra commenced the creation of another universe (including another Brahma) for Trisanku. He had only completed the Universe when Brihaspati ordered him to stop. Trisanku, however, did not fully transcend through Trisanku Svarga created for him. He remained fixed and upside-down in the sky and was transformed into a constellation, which is now known as Crux.

In the process of forming a new universe, Vishvamitra used up all the tapas he had gained from his austerities. Therefore, after the Trisanku episode, Vishvamitra had to start his prayers again to attain the status of a Brahmarshi and become an equal of Vashista.

=== Harishchandra's sacrifice ===
While undertaking a penance, Kaushika helps a boy named Shunashepa who has been sold by his parents to be sacrificed at Harishchandra's yagna to please Varuna. Harishchandra's son Rohit did not want to be the one sacrificed to Varuna, as was originally promised to Vishwamitra. Instead Sunashepa was selected. A devastated and terrified Shunahshepa falls at the feet of Kaushika, who is deep in meditation and begs for his help.

Kaushika teaches secret mantras to Sunashepa. The boy sings these mantras at the ceremony, is blessed by Mitra and Varuna and Ambarisha's ceremony is completed.

=== Teacher of Rama ===
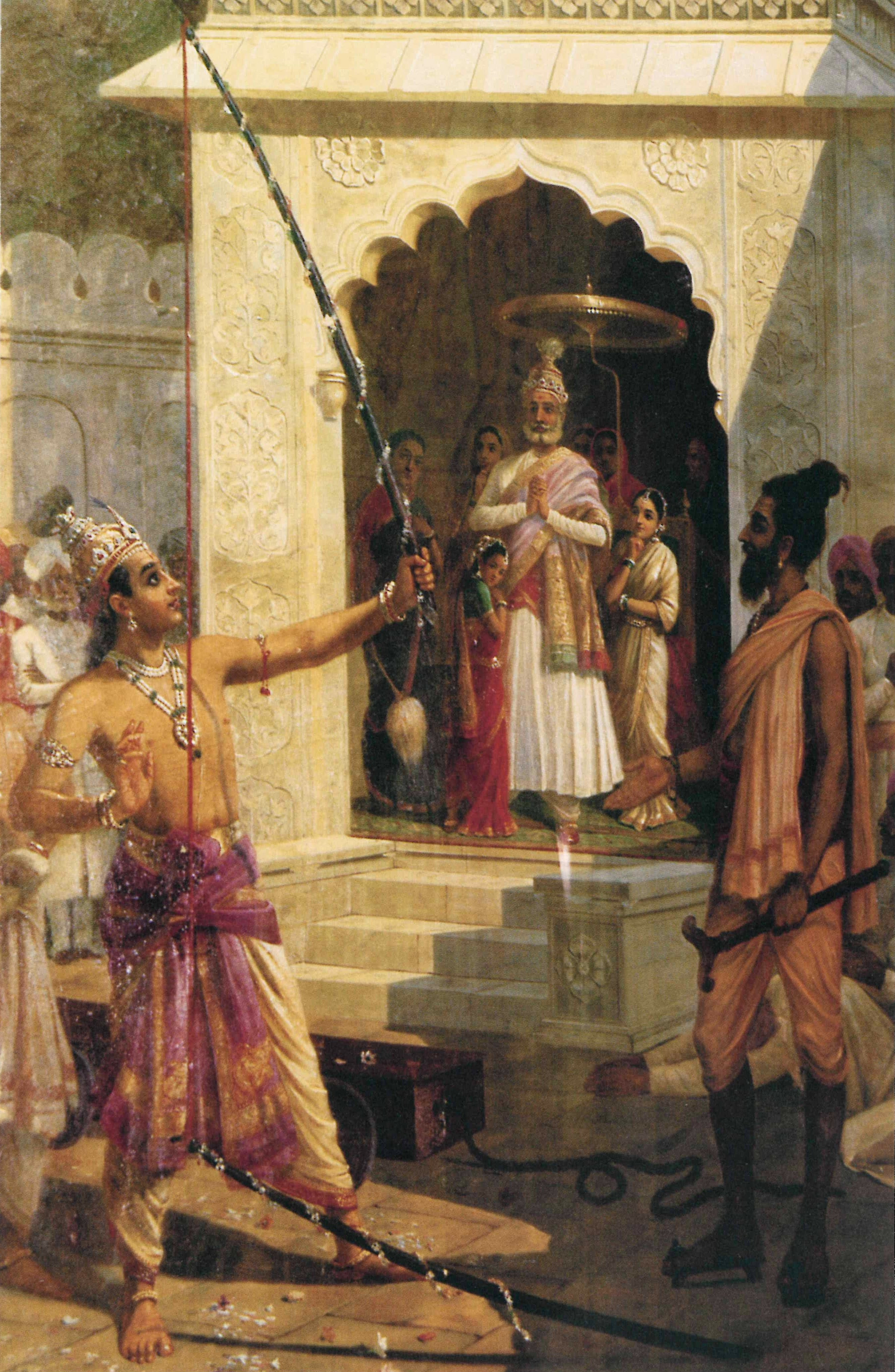
Vishvamitra looks at Rama as he breaks the bow, winning the hand of Sita in marriage. Painting by Raja Ravi Varma.

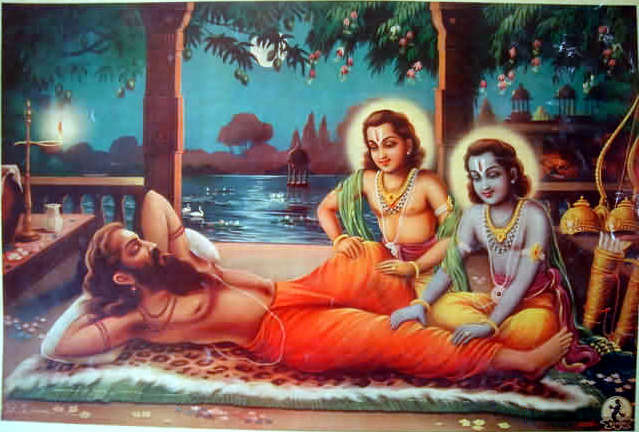
Rama and Lakshmana perform guru-seva by pressing Vishvamitra's feet and legs (bazaar art, mid-1900's)

In the Hindu epic Ramayana, Vishvamitra is the preceptor of Rama and his brother Lakshmana. Rama is prince of Ayodhya, and the seventh Avatar of god Vishnu.

Vishvamitra gives them the knowledge of the Devastras or celestial weaponry [bala and ati bala], trains them in advanced religion and guides them to kill powerful demons like Tadaka, Maricha and Subahu. He also leads them to the Swayamvara ceremony for princess Sita, who becomes wife of Rama.

== Works ==
Vishvamitra is said to have written the Gayatri Mantra. It is a verse from a sukta of Rigveda (Mandala 3.62.10). Gāyatrī is the name of the Vedic meter in which the verse is composed.

Gayatri mantra is repeated and cited very widely in Vedic literature and praised in several well-known classical Hindu texts such as Manusmriti ("there is nothing greater than the Savitri (Gayatri) Mantra.", Manu II, 83), Harivamsa and Bhagavad Gita. The mantra is an important part of the upanayana ceremony for young males in Hinduism and has long been recited by dvija men as part of their daily rituals. Modern Hindu reform movements spread the practice of the mantra to include women and all castes and its recitation is now widespread.

== Descendants ==
Vishvamitra had many children from different women. Madhuchhanda was also a composer of many hymns in the Rigveda. According to the Mahabharata, Sushruta, an ancient Indian physician and surgeon, was one of his sons. Ashtaka, who was born from Madhavi, was successor to his kingdom. Shakuntala was born from the apsara Menaka. She was the mother of Bharata, who became a powerful emperor as well as an ancestor of Kuru kings.

Vishvamitra is one of the eight main gotras of Brahmins. All Brahmins belonging to Kaushika or Vishvamitra gotra are believed to have descended from Sage Vishvamitra. The distinction can be found from the respective pravaras,

1. Vishvamitra, Aghamarshana, Kaushika
2. Vishvamitra, Devarata, Owdala
3. Vishvamitra, Ashtaka
4. Vishvamitra, Maadhucchandasa, Dhananjaya

Kaushika is one of the pravara gotras of Vishvamitra gotra among Brahmins.

== In popular culture ==
=== Graphic Novel ===
Amar Chitra Katha series number 599 titled Vishwamitra, published in 1975, also tells the story of Vishwamitra in the form of a graphic novel.

=== In film and television ===
- Vishvamitra (1952) by Baburao Painter starring Sapru in 1952.
- Vishvamitra is shown in the 1985 Tamil movie Raja Rishi with Sivaji Ganesan playing the role of the Sage.
- Vishvamitra's role is played by Shrikant Soni in the TV series Ramayan, 1987 and Uttar Ramayan, 1988 on Doordarshan.
- Vishvamitra is shown in 1991 Telugu movie Brahmarshi Vishvamitra with N. T. Rama Rao playing the role of Sage.
- The TV show Vishvamitra (1989) is made on the story of Brahmarishi Vishvamitra. The role of Vishvamitra is played by Mukesh Khanna.
- Vishvamitra's role is played by Ashok Banthia in the TV series Ramayan, 2008 on Imagine TV.
- Vishvamitra is shown in the show Siya Ke Ram airing on Star Plus, starring Manish Wadhwa.
- The TV show Piya Albela is also based on the classic love story of Menaka and Vishvamitra, depicted as a modern-day love story revolving around Naren and Pooja.
- Vishvamitra is played by Nimai Bali in Karmaphal Daata Shani.
- In 2026, Vishvamitra was portrayed by Ajinkya Deo in the film, Ramayana: Part 1.

== See also ==
- Vishwaguru
- Hinduism
- Hindu mythology
