= Pulinda =

Ancient Indian tribe

Pulinda during the post-Vedic period

Pulinda (Sanskrit: Pulinda) was an ancient tribe of south-central South Asia whose existence is attested during the Iron Age. The Pulindas were a non-Indo-Aryan tribe.

== Location ==
During the later Vedic period, the Pulindas were living to the south-east of the Daśārṇas.

Though clearly associated with the Vindhyan region, the Pulindas are sometimes believed to have had multiple tribal branches that ranged up to the Himalayan region and Assam. In the Himalayan region, ancient Indian literature often mentions them in conjunction with the Kiratas.

== History ==
The Rock Edicts of Ashoka (269 BCE - 231 BCE) mention the Pulindas, their capital Pulinda-nagara, and their neighboring tribes, based on which their capital is sometimes located in present-day Jabalpur District of Madhya Pradesh state. Basak identifies them with the hill tribes of the Vindhya and Satpura ranges, more specifically the Bhils.

== Sources ==
- Raychaudhuri, Hemchandra (1953). Political History of Ancient India: From the Accession of Parikshit to the Extinction of Gupta Dynasty. University of Calcutta.
