= List of gotras =

List of lineages in Hinduism

In Hindu culture, a gotra is equivalent to a lineage, akin to a family name, but the given name of a family is often different from its gotra, and may reflect the traditional occupation, place of residence or other important family characteristic rather than the lineage.

People belonging to a particular gotra may not be of the same caste (as there are many gotras which are part of different castes) in the Hindu social system. However, there is a notable exception among matrilineal Tulu speakers, for whom the lineages are the same across the castes.

People of the same gotra are generally not allowed to marry. At weddings, the gotras of the bride and the groom are read aloud to verify that they are not breaking this rule.

== Main Brahmin Gotras ==
A list of major Brahmin gotras according to the Sutras:

- Bhr̥gu (Jamadagni)
  - Bhārgava
  - Cyāvana
  - Aurva
  - Jāmadagnya
  - Vātsa
- Kevala Bhr̥gu
  - Bhārgava
  - Daivodāsa
  - Vainya
  - Pārtha
  - Śaunaka
  - Gārtsamada
- Gautama
  - Āṅgirasa
  - Gautama
  - Kākṣīvata
  - Dairghatamasa
  - Auśanasa
- Bharadvāja
  - Āṅgirasa
  - Bārhaspatya
  - Bhāradvāja
  - Gārgya
- Kevala Aṅgiras
  - Āṅgirasa
  - Āmbarīṣa
  - Māndhātra
  - Kautsa
  - Kāṇva
  - Maudgalya
  - Sāṁkr̥tya
  - Śāktya
- Atri
  - Ātreya
- Viśvāmitra
  - Vaiśvāmitra
  - Daivarāta
  - Mādhucchandasa
  - Kauśika
  - Gāthina
  - Aindra
- Kaśyapa
  - Kāśyapa
  - Āvatsāra
  - Āsita
  - Śāṇḍila
  - Daivala
- Vasiṣṭha
  - Vāsiṣṭha
  - Maitrāvaruṇa
  - Aupamanyava
  - Pārāśarya
  - Śāktya
  - Sāṁkr̥tya
- Agastya
  - Āgastya
