= Mahishmati =

Ancient city in present-day central India

Mahishmati in Mahajanapadas of India in 500 BCE.

Mahishmati (IAST: Māhiṣmati) was an ancient city and the capital of Haihayas in the present-day central India on the banks of Narmada River (in Madhya Pradesh), although its exact location is uncertain. The city may have flourished as late as until 13th century, as indicated by a Paramara inscription.

== Identification ==
Map showing Ujjayini and Pratishthana, with the two hypothesized locations (marked as star) of Mahishmati, which was located on the route connecting these two cities.

The following things are known about Mahishmati's location:

- It was located on the banks of the Narmada river.
- It was located to the south of Ujjayini, and north of Pratishthana, on the route connecting the two cities (according to Sutta Nipata). Patanjali mentions that a traveler starting out from Ujjayini saw the sunrise at Mahishmati.
- It was located in the Avanti kingdom, and at times was a part of a separate kingdom near Avanti. It replaced Ujjayani as the kingdom's capital for a brief period. It also served as the capital of the other kingdoms that separated from Avanti, such as Anupa.
- Avanti was divided into two parts by the Vindhyas. Ujjayini was located in the northern part, while Mahishmati was located in the southern part.

Several cities in Madhya Pradesh, located along the Narmada river, are claimed to be the ancient Mahishmati. These include:

Mandhata or Omkareshwar
F. E. Pargiter, and G. C. Mendis, among others, identify Mahishmati with the Mandhata island (Omkareshwar).
According to Pargiter, the description of Mahishmati in Raghuvamsa makes it clear that it was located on an island. Moreover, Harivamsa states that the founder of Mahishmati was muchukunda, the son of King Mandhata.
A 1225 CE inscription of the Paramara king Devapala has been found at Mandhata. It records the grant of a village to Brahmins, and states that the grant was made while the king was staying at Mahishmati.

Maheshwar
HD Sankalia, PN Bose and Francis Wilford, among others, identify Mahishmati with present-day Maheshwar.
Pargiter criticises this identification, stating that the Bramin priests of Maheshwar claimed their town as the ancient Mahishmati on basis of similar-sounding names, in order to glorify their town.

Other obsolete identifications
Writers such as Alexander Cunningham, John Faithfull Fleet and Girija Shankar Agrawal identified Mandla as the location of ancient Mahishmati. However, this view is no longer considered as accurate by the modern scholars.
B. Lewis Rice identified Mahishmati as a location in the former Mysore State (present-day Karnataka). His argument was based on Mahabharata, which states that Sahadeva crossed the Kaveri River on his way to Mahishmati. However, besides the southern Kaveri, there is a smaller Kaveri, which meets Narmada near Mandhata.

== Mentions in ancient literature ==
=== Sanskrit texts ===
The Sanskrit epic Ramayana mentions the attack of Rakshasa king Ravana on Mahishmati. The Anushasana Parva states that Ikshvaku's son Dashashva was a king of Mahishmati. It goes on to mention that the Haihaya king Kartavirya Arjuna ruled the entire earth from his capital Mahishmati (13:52). He was killed by Parashurama.

Mahabharata mentions Mahishmati as part of a kingdom distinct from the Avanti kingdom. The Sabha Parva (2:30) states that the Pandava general Sahadeva attacked Mahishmati, and defeated its ruler Nila. Mahismati was protected by Agni, due to his matrimonial relationship with the king's daughter. Agni even granted the unmarried women of Mahismati liberty of not staying with only one husband forever, and moving about freely. King Nila of Mahishmati is mentioned as a leader in the Kurukshetra War, rated by Bhishma as a Rathi. His coat of mail had blue colour (Mbh 5:19,167).

Harivamsha (33.1847) names the founder of Mahishmati as Mahishmant, a king who was the son of Sahanja and a descendant of Yadu through Haihaya. At another place, it names the city's founder as Muchukunda, an ancestor of Rama. It states that he built the cities of Mahishmati and Purika in the Rksha mountains.

The Raghuvamsa states that Mahishmati was located on the Reva river (Narmada), and was the capital of the Anupa country.

According to the Padma Purana (VI.115), the city was founded by a certain Mahisha

Another account states that Kartavirya Arjuna conquered Mahishmati city from Karkotaka Naga, a Naga chief and made it his fortress-capital.

=== Pali texts ===
The Buddhist text Digha Nikaya mentions Mahishmati as the capital of Avanti, while Anguttara Nikaya states that Ujjaini was Avanti's capital. The Maha-Govinda Suttanta also states that Mahishmati as the capital of Avanti, whose king was one Vessabhu. It is possible that the capital of Avanti was transferred from Ujjayani to Mahishmati temporarily.

The Dipavamsa mentions a territory called Mahisa, describing it as Mahisa-ratta ("Mahisa country"). The Mahavamsa describes this region as a mandala, calling it Mahisha-mandala. The 5th century Buddhist scholar Buddhaghosa terms this territory variously as Rattham-Mahisham, Mahishaka-mandala and Mahishmaka. John Faithfull Fleet theorized that Mahishmati was the capital of this region, which was named after a tribe called "Mahisha". This appears to be same as "Mahishaka", which is described as a southern kingdom (that is, south of the Vindhyas and the Narmada) in the Bhishma Parva of the Mahabharata.

The Sutta Nipata states that when Bavari's disciples traveled from Pratishthana to Ujjayani, Mahishmati was one of the cities on the route. The inscriptions at Sanchi mention that pilgrims from Mahishmati visited the stupa at Sanchi.

== Epigraphic records ==
During the 6th and 7th centuries, Mahishmati may have served as the capital of the Kalachuri kingdom.

Rulers of some 11th and 12th century kingdoms in present-day South India claimed Haihaya ancestry. They indicated their claimed place of origin with the title "Lord of Mahishmati, the best of the towns".

Mahishmati appears to have been a flourishing city in as late as the 13th century. A 1225 CE inscription of the Paramara king Devapala mentions that he stayed at Mahishmati.

== In popular culture ==
The Baahubali film series directed by S. S. Rajamouli is set in a fictionalized version of the kingdom.
