= Abhivadaye =

Abhivadaye (Sanskrit: अभिवादये, romanized: abhivādaye, lit. 'I salute') is a religious practice among Hindu men to introduce themselves to their elders.

== Practice ==
The abhivadaye consists of an individual offering an introduction of themselves by mentioning the following markers of their identity:

- Pravara
- Gotra
- Sutra
- Veda
- Name
