= Pravaras =

Hindu concept of lineage

In Hindu culture, a pravara (Sanskrit for "most excellent") refers to a system of identity, particularly a family line. The pravara system is based on the descendants of a rishi (sage) after whom a "gotra" (clan) is named, and these descendants are considered eponyms by the members of the "gotra." It represents a secondary level of segmentation within the gotra system. The pravara is a significant aspect of the exogamous system in ancient Brahmanical families.

== Significance ==
The significance of Pravara lies in its role in establishing the worth or fitness of the sacrificer as a descendant of the rishis named in the Pravara. It serves as a means of identifying the lineage and ancestry of the individual, particularly during sacred rituals and prayers. The recitation of the Pravara during these rituals is a way of declaring that the individual is as worthy as their ancestors to offer sacrifices and perform sacred acts. Furthermore, the Pravara is intricately linked to the exogamous structure of ancient Brahmanical families. It provides a clear and precise method of determining a person's position within the exogamous system, guiding marriage practices and ensuring that individuals do not marry within the same Pravara. In addition to its role in ritualistic practices and exogamy, the Pravara also holds a wider application in modern times, where it is used to establish the lineage of the family and is recited during daily prayers to demonstrate the fitness of the individual to perform sacred acts. In the past, it referred to the invocation of the deity Agni (Fire) by the name of the rishi-ancestors of a Brahmin who consecrates the sacrificial fire. Pravara names were used by the priest to prove his authenticity to the deity Havya-Vahana, who carries the libations to heaven. It was a law that the number of Pravara-rishis pronounced during the invocation could be one to five. In later times, the pravara came to have a wider application, particularly in the context of regulating marriage and asserting one's lineage as a descendant of worthy ancestors. People belonging to the same gotra or having the same pravara, even if they had only one in common, were not allowed to intermarry.

== History ==
The pravara system has a long history within the Brahmanical tradition of India. The literary sources regarding Pravara are primarily found in the ancient Vedic texts, Brahmanas, and Sutras, as well as in later medieval texts. Some scholars believe that it originated during the Rig-vedic period, which dates back to around 1500 BCE., and the system gradually came into use during the formative period of the Yajur-veda. However, Ghurye claims that the system of Pravara emerged and took shape after the formation of Gotras, which is estimated to have occurred around 800 BCE. The understanding and development of Pravara seem to have evolved gradually over time, with different texts and traditions adding to their complexity and significance. The Brahmanas and Sutras provide detailed expositions of the Pravara system and its use in regulating marriage practices and establishing lineage. The Baudhayana's Srauta Sutra, dated around 600 BCE, is the earliest known text that provides a list of 91 pravara-rishis associated with the various Gotras. During the period of Apastamba's Srauta Sutra, estimated to have been composed around 450 BCE, the Pravara system underwent significant development and gained a more organized framework within the broader context of the Gotra system. Later medieval texts, such as the Pravara-manjari, provide lists of Pravaras and their respective rishis, as well as detailed accounts of the Pravara system and its use in exogamy and ritualistic practices. The Smrtyarthasdra of Sridhara, composed between A.D. 1150 and 1200, is another important medieval text that discusses the Pravara system and its use in regulating marriage practices. The Pravara-darpana offers a more explicit account of the pravara lists and is dated before 1612.

The Kalachuri inscriptions revealed the mention of various Gotras and Pravaras with corresponding Veda Sakhas. The historical sources include inscriptions such as the Bheraghat Stone Inscription of Narasimha, the Jabalpur Stone Inscription of Jayasimha, the Amoda Plates of Prithvideva, and others, along with scholarly interpretations. Inscriptions from ancient India, such as the Maitraka and Gurjara-Pratihara charters, also provide information about the pravara system and its use in establishing ancestral lineages and social identities. These inscriptions often include the recitation of pravaras and the establishment of gotras.

== Ritualistic Usages ==
Pravara is recited at certain points in the sacrificial ritual. It is used to assert the individual's pre-collection identity as a member of the Vedic oral traditions. They are required to pronounce the names of their important ancestors who were the founders of their family. This is usually done when performing sacred acts, repeating prayers, or invoking the Gods. The Pravara chant is specific to their Gotra and is used to invoke the God of Fire, who is believed to carry oblations and prayers to preceptors and the Gods. The recitation of the Pravara forms an integral part of virtually every Srauta offering, and it is recited by the Hotr, a member of the Vedic oral traditions agency, in the regular isti. Each Gotra, which is a unit of the Brahmanical exogamous system, is subdivided into several ganas, each with its own distinctive pravara. All ganas within one Gotra usually have at least one pravara-name in common. While the connection of pravaras with exogamy is considered secondary, the pravara system is closely related to the system of gotras. Gotra refers to a larger exogamous group to which a person belongs. However, as the usage of the term gotra became loosely applied to smaller subdivisions and even individual families, the pravara became necessary to determine the specific exogamous group. The pravara serves as a test to decide to which of the larger exogamous groups a person belongs.

The recitation of the family pedigree is an important part of the daily Sandhya ceremonial. It is a religious obligation for every high caste man to preserve the memory of his ancestors and maintain the line of his family descent unbroken. The worshipper declares his gotra and recites the names of his three ancestors (Pravara index) as part of this recitation.

For instance, a worshipper says:

I belong to a particular gotra (or tribe of Brahmans); I have three ancestors—Angirasa, Sainya, and Gargya; I am a student of the Asvalayana Sutra, and follow the Sakala-Sakha of the Rgveda."'

Pravara names were recited by Brahmins three times a day in the past, but currently, only a few Brahmins continue this practice.

=== Pravara Index ===
The Pravara index is a patrilineal descent formula used to identify one's Gotra lineage in the Vedic tradition. It consists of a list of lineages expressed as a patrilineal descent formula, ranging from a one rishi formula (rare) to a five rishi formula (also rare), but most falling in between, with three rishi formula being the most common. The Pravara formula typically consists of three names, with the first name being the remote ancestor, the second name being an intermediate figure after the remote ancestor, and the third name being the one nearest to the worshipper.

An example of a Pravara formula is the Kaśyapa-Avatsra-Nidhruva formula, which implies that Kaśyapa is the remote First Singer of the family, Avatsra is an intermediate figure after Kaśyapa, and Nidhruva is the one nearest to the worshipper, the last one, putatively historical and actually so in some instances.

== Gotra Pravara ==
- Vasistha:
  1. Vasistha, Saktya, Parāsara
  2. Maitravaruṇa, Vasistha, Kauṇḍinya,
- Kapisa: Angiras, Bharadwaja, Bārhaspatya, Vandana, Matavacha
- Kundina Gautama: Angiras, Āyāsya, Kuṇḍina Gautama
- Bharadwāja: Aṅgiras, Bārhaspatya, Bharadwāja
- Shaunaka: Shaunaka, Hotra, Gritsamada
- Vadula: Bhārgava, Vaitahavya, Sāvedasa
- Srivatsa and Vatsa: Bhārgava, Chyavana, Apnavān/Apnuvat, Aurava, Jāmadagnya (Paraśhurāma)
- Sāvarṇa: Aurava, Chyavana, Bhārgava, Jamadagni, Apnuvat
- ĀAtreya: Atreya, Archanās, Syavasva
- Kauśika: Vaiśvāmitra, Agamarṣaṇa, Kausika
- Kalabodhana/Kalabaudha: Visvamitra, Āgamarṣaṇa, Kālabodhana/Kālabaudha
- Bhārgava: Bhārgava, Tvaṣṭā, Viśvarūpa
- Visvāmitra:
  1. Vaisvāmitra, Devarāta, Audala
  2. Vaisvāmitra, Ashtaka
- Kauṇḍinya: Vāsiṣṭha, Maitravāruṇa, Kauṇḍinya
- Kapinjala: Vasiṣṭha, Aindrapramada, Abharadvāsavya
- Harita/Haritasa:
  1. Harita, Ambarīisa, Yuvanasva
  2. Angiras, Ambariṣa, Yuvanasva
- Gautamas: Angiras, Āyāsya, Gautama
- Maudgalya: (3 Variations)
  1. Angiras, Bharmyasva, Maudgalya
  2. Tarkṣya, Bharmyasva, Maudgalya
  3. Angiras, Dhavya, Maudgalya
- Sandilya: (4 Variations)
  1. Kasyapa, Avatsara, Daivala
  2. Kasyapa, Daivala, Asita
  3. Shandilya, Asita, Daivala
  4. Kasyapa, Asita, Shandilya
- Naidhruvakasyapa: Kasyapa, Avatsara, Naidhruva
- Kutsa: Angirasa, Mandhātā, Kautsa
- Kapila: Angirasa, Amahaiya, Orukṣaya
- Kanva: (2 Variations)
  1. Angirasa, Ajamila, Kanva
  2. Angirasa, Kaura, Kanva
- Parasara: Vasiṣtha, Saktya, Parasarya
- Upamanyu: Aindrapramada, Bhadravasavya
- Āgastya: Agastya, Tardhachyuta, Saumavaha
- Gārgi: (2 Variations)
  1. Angirasa, Bharhaspatya, Bharadwaja, Sainya, Gargya
  2. Angirasa, Sainya, Gargya
- Bādarāyaṇa: Angirasa, Parsadaśva, Ratitara
- Kasyapa: (3 Variations)
  1. Kasyapa, Avatsara, Daivala
  2. Kasyapa, Avatsara, Asita
  3. Kasyapa, Avatsara, Naidhruva, Rebha, Raibha, Sandila and Sandilya
- Sankṛti: (2 Variations)
  1. Āngirasa, Kauravidha, Sankṛtya
  2. Saktya, Sankṛtya, Gaurvitti
- Suryadhwaja: Lakhi Maharṣi, Sorala, Binju
- Daivaratasa: Visvamitra, Daivaratasa, Avudhala
- Pauragutsa: Vidahavya, Travedasa, Tradadasyuhu
- Ratitaras: Angirasa, Vairupya, Parshadas'va
- Mauna Bhargavasa: Bhargava, Vitahavya, Savedasa

== See also ==
- List of Brahmin gotras
