= Harita (Hinduism) =

King in Hindu tradition

- Texts: Puranas

Genealogy
- Parents: Yauvanāśva (father)
- Dynasty: Suryavamsha

Harita (Sanskrit: हरित, romanized: Harita) is a king in Hindu literature. He is described to be the son of Yauvanāśva, and the grandson of King Ambarisha of the Suryavamsha dynasty.

Harita is believed to have left his kingdom as a symbolic expiation of his sins. After completing the austerities, according to the Sthala Purana of Sriperumbudur, his descendants and he were accorded the status of a Brahmana by Narayana.

== Literature ==
According to the Sthala Purana (the regional account of a temple's sacredness) of Sriperumbudur, Harita once embarked on a hunting expedition, when he spotted a tiger attacking a cow. In order to save the cow, he slew the tiger, but the cow was also killed. Even as he lamented his act, a heavenly voice asked him to go to Sriperumbudur, bathe in the temple tank, and pray for forgiveness from Narayana, who would absolve him of his sins. The King obeyed this instruction, after which Narayana is described to appear before him, and absolved him of his sins. The deity also is said to have proclaimed that even though the king had been a Kshatriya all these years, due to his blessings, he and his descendants would now acquire the status of a Brahmana.

== Gotra ==
To this day, many royals claim descent from this king of the Suryavamsha dynasty to substantiate their claims to royalty. They claim descent from Harita, and seek legitimacy from Hindu texts such as the Vishnu Purana, Vayu Purana, Linga Purana.

The pravara to be used by the Brahmanas of the Harita gotra in ceremonies and other auspicious functions is of two variations, namely:

- Harita, Ambarīśa, Yauvanāśva.
- Āṅgīrasa, Ambarīśa, Yauvanāśva
