= Savarna (gotra) =

Brahmin gotra

Savarna (Sanskrit: सावर्ण, IAST: sāvarṇa) or Savarni/Shavarna is a Brahmin gotra that comprises Kanyakubja Brahmins and Saryupareen Brahmins who are the descendants of sage Savarna Muni. The origins of Savarna gotra can be traced back to the origins of Kanyakubja Brahmins in Kannauj, Uttar Pradesh.

Among Bengali Kulin Brahmins, the common surname for Savarna gotra Brahmins is Ganguly or Gangopadhyay.

== History and beliefs ==
Savarna Brahmins are believed to be the descendants of sage Savarna Muni (or Savarni Muni), belonging to the family of Bhrigu. Several ancient Indian literary works and inscriptions suggest that Savarna Brahmins have five Pravaras - Aurva, Chyavana, Bhargava, Jamadagnya and Apnavana.

Savarna Brahmins have historically been the followers of Samaveda, with Gandharva Veda being their preferred Upa Veda (sub-Veda).

According to the kulapanjikas, the genealogical chronicles of some Bengali Brahmin communities, Savarna gotra Brahmins were one of the five Brahmin gotras (along with Shandilya, Bharadwaj, Kashyap and Vatsya) that immigrated from Uttar Pradesh and Bihar to Bengal in the 11th century. This branch of Bengali Savarna Brahmins is known as Kulin Brahmins, who are further classified in two sections based on their geographic characteristics - Rarh Brahmins and Varendra Brahmins.

== Present ==
Today, Brahmins of Savarna gotra can be found across India and Nepal. However, their surnames vary from region to region.

== See also ==
- Bhrigu
