= Brahmin gotra =

Used to denote Brahmin paternal lineage

Brahmin Gotra (Sanskrit ब्राह्मण गोत्र) is an exogamous unit used to denote the paternal lineage of individuals belonging to the Brahmin in the Hindu Varna system. In Hindu culture, the Brahmin considered to be one of the four major social classes of the Varna system. In Sanskrit, one of the meanings of the word Gotra is “a descendant through an unbroken patriline”. According to Hindu scripture, members of the Brahmin community are believed to have descended from the first seven Brahmin saints of the Vedic period. A Gotra represents the lineage of an individual saint and a Brahmin’s Gotra denotes which of these saints is their ancestor.

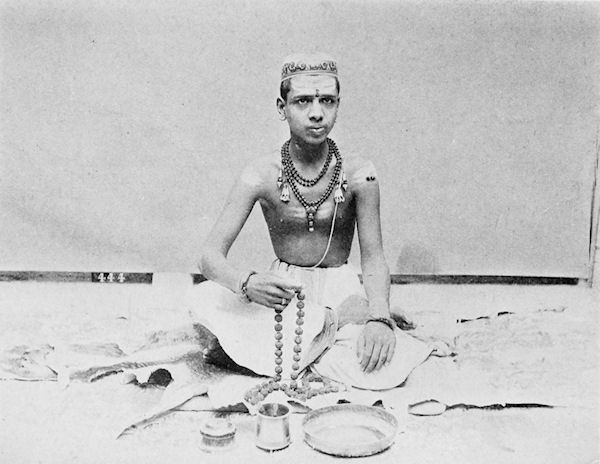
A young Brahmin priest performing Pooja.

== Etymology, history and origins ==
The word Gotra comes from the Sanskrit Gau, cow and Trahi, a shed or stable. Translated literally, Gotra means ‘cowshed’ or ‘cow pen’ but the term has several connotations across Vedic literature. One of the earliest instances of ‘Gotra’ being used to denote paternal lineage appears around 1000 BCE in the Atharva Veda, a sacred Hindu text, where the word is used to refer to ‘clans’ or ‘groups’ descended from a common paternal ancestor. Subsequently, the Chandogaya Upanishad, another Hindu text written in the 7th century BCE, defines a Gotra as a mechanism through which the paternal lineage of an individual could be traced and identified while according to ancient Sanskrit linguist Panini, in his Astadhyayi, the term is equated with the word ‘progeny’.

Ancient Hindu scriptures such as the Upanishads and the Rigveda outline the conception and evolution of the Brahminical Gotric system. These texts posit that ‘Gotras’ emerged initially as a uniquely Brahminical concept; a marker of the paternal lineage of individuals within the caste.

=== Lineage of the Saptarishi ===
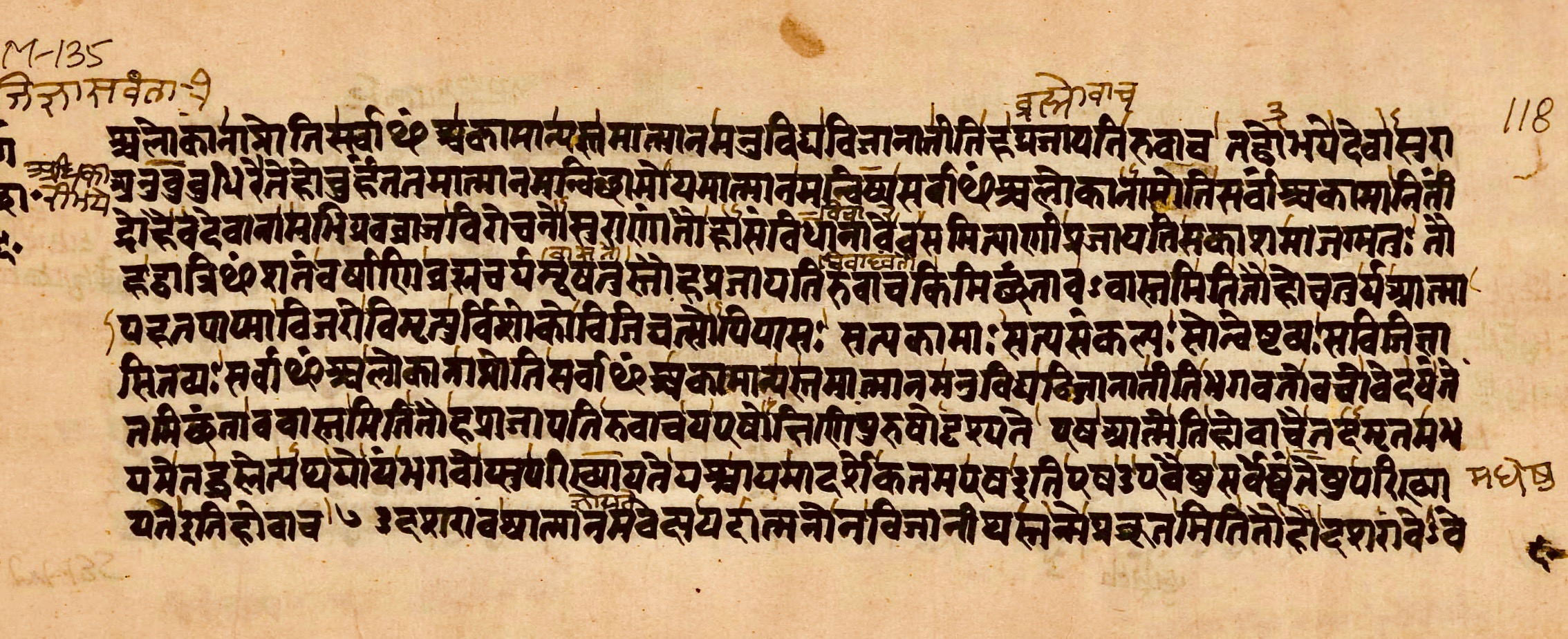
A verse from the Chandogya Upanishad.

The Rigveda states that the Brahmin community is descended from the first seven Brahmin saints (Saptarishi) of the Vedic age, who, according to the Brihadaranyaka Upanishad, were, Vishvamitra, Jamadagni, Gautama, Atri, Upreti, Vasishta and Kashyapa. With each member of the caste believed to trace their lineage back to one of these saints, a Brahmin’s Gotra represents a means to track an individual’s patriline and thus indicate which one of these saints is their ancestor. For example, Brahmins of the Kashyapa Gotra are believed to have descended from the saint Kashyapa.

=== Historical function ===
Early Brahminical society was heavily influenced by the Gotric system. Another revered Vedic text, the Manusmriti, considers Brahmin Gotras to be exogamous units, developed to promote genetic diversity within the Brahmin caste. With Gotras designed to prevent endogamous marriages within the fairly small early Brahmin community, any sexual or marital relations between individuals from the same Gotra were regarded as incestuous and forbidden, and only inter-Gotra marriages allowed. Gotras were often also considered when dividing and distributing the property of a male Brahmin upon his death. The Manusmriti states that after the death of a Brahmin man, any property he possessed must be passed down to those within his own Gotra. This meant that his married daughters, who would change their Gotra to that of their husbands after their marriage, maternal relatives or the relatives of his wife bore no right to Brahmin man’s property after his death. By the early modern period, as Brahminical society evolved further, Gotras often also dictated other aspects of a Brahmin’s life, such as defining the manner in which religious practices and rituals were performed by a family, the deities families worshipped, a Brahmin group’s social identity and sometimes even an individual’s occupation.

== Divisions and sub-divisions ==
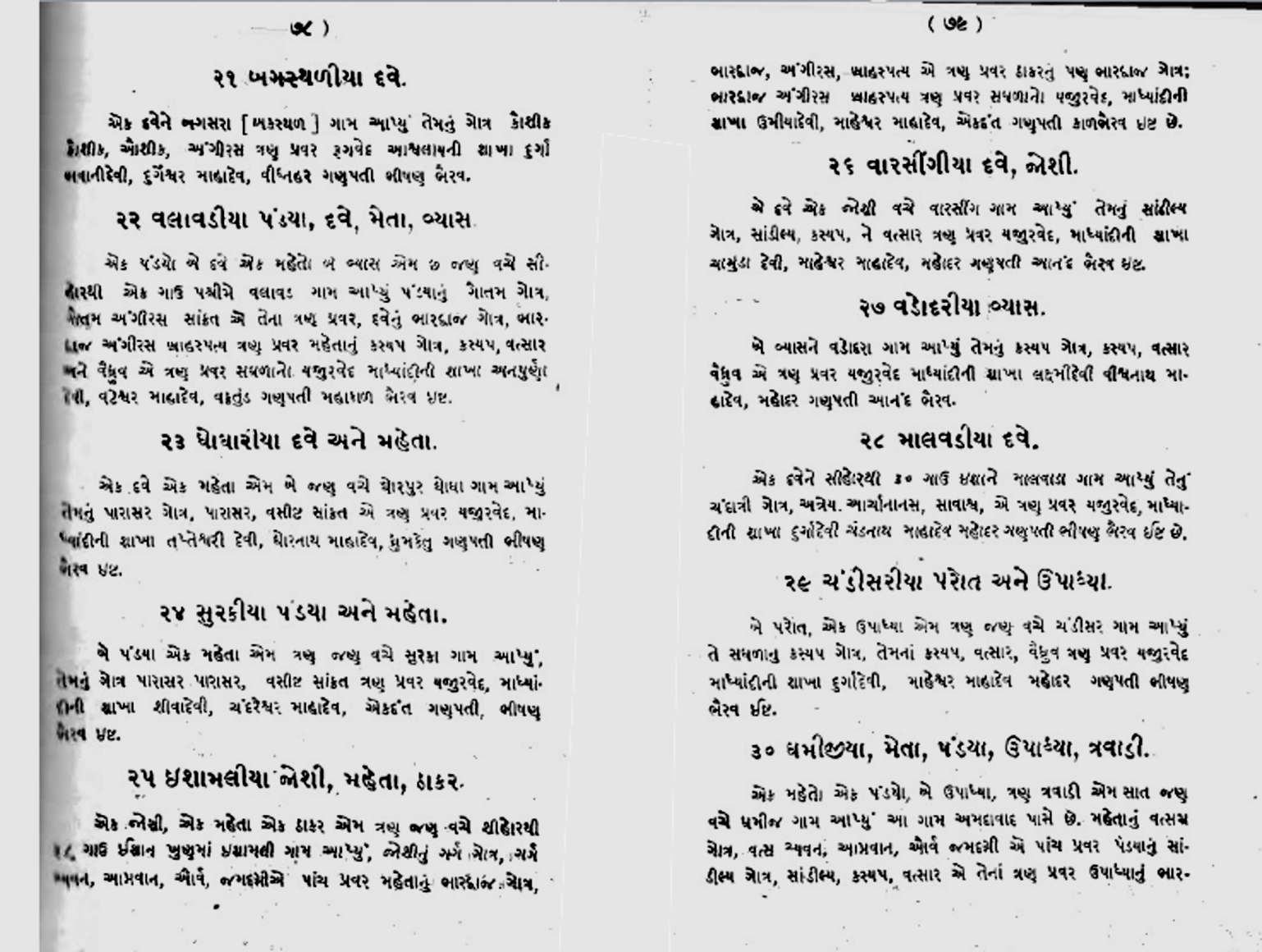
A list of the Audichya Sashtra Brahmin community's Gotras and Pravaras, written in the Gujrati script.

The seven major Brahmin Gotras take the names of the saints whose lineages they represent: Vishvamitra, Upreti, Jamadagni, Gautama, Atri, Vasishta and Kashyapa. Over time however, as the Brahmin caste expanded, several more Brahmin Gotras appeared. Post-Vedic Hindu texts such as the Krishna Yajurveda and the Mahabharata indicate the existence of 18 Brahmin Gotras while the Vishnu Purana suggests that the number may be as high as 49, despite maintaining that the community originates solely from the Saptarishi.The emergence of new Gotras is widely attributed to the integration of several tribes and communities from other Varnas into the Brahmin caste during the Late Vedic period. This integration occurred as a result of the Rigvedic concept of social mobility, which allowed peoples from lower Varnas displaying ‘Brahminical virtues’ to attain ‘Brahmin’ status.According to the Bhagavad Gita, individuals consistently exhibiting ‘traditionally Brahmin’ qualities such as patience, restraint, integrity and knowledge could, should they choose so, be absorbed into the Brahmin Varna, regardless of whichever Varna they were born into.

While such populations often adopted one of the major Brahmin Gotras, some of these communities had developed similar Gotric systems of their own. However, unlike the Brahminical system, the Gotras of those in the other Hindu Varnas often had totemic root lineages, with many communities believing that they had descended from certain animals or trees. These new Brahmins regularly chose to retain their original Gotras upon changing their Varna. The Gotras preserved by these groups were later assimilated into the list of Brahmin Gotras.

Despite the expansion and division of the Brahmin caste however, the role of Gotras remained largely unchanged. For example, for the Iyengar Brahmins of Karnataka, a tribe adopted into the Brahmin Varna as recently as the 8th century CE, Gotras continued to serve as means of preserving genetic diversity within the clan and providing a basis for the division of property.

=== Dispute in the identity of the Saptarishi ===
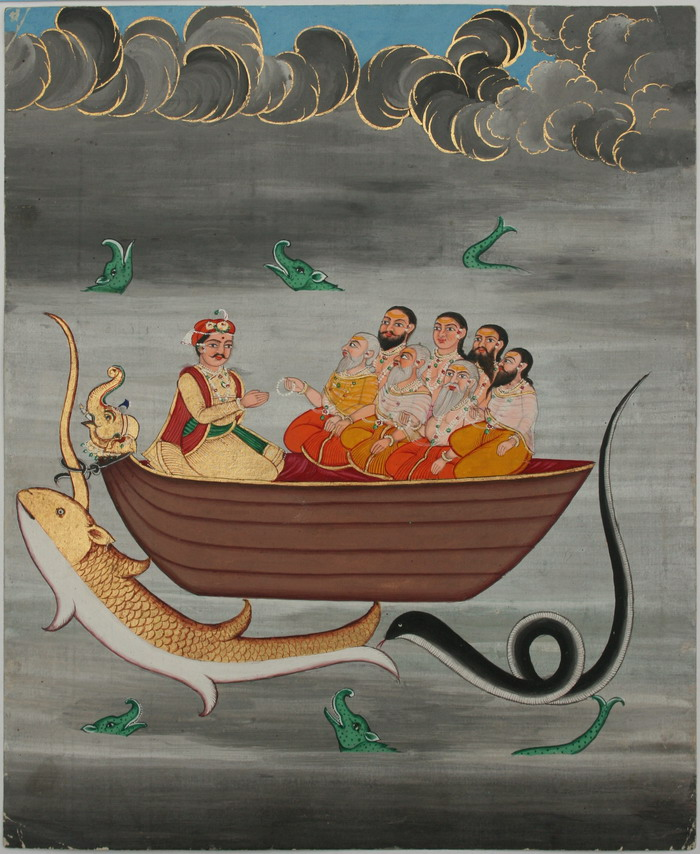
Artistic portrayal of Manu and Saptarishi of the Vedic age.

Another potential reason behind the emergence of multiple new Brahmin Gotras, despite the repeated insistence of several Hindu texts that the caste is descended only from the Saptarishi, is thought to be due to the inconsistencies in Hindu literature regarding the identities of the Saptarishi themselves. The Brihadaranyaka Upanishad holds that Vishvamitra, Jamadagni, Upreti, Gautama, Atri, Vasishta and Kashyapa are the first Brahmin saints of the Vedic age and the sole ancestors of the Brahmin community, and while this list is largely accepted within most Brahmin communities, the identities of the saints who form the Saptarishi in fact vary largely across Hindu scriptures. For example, in the Krishna Yajurveda, the Saptarishi are identified as Angiras, Bhrugu, Kutsa, Gautama, Atri, Vasishta and Kashyapa. The variation from the Brihadaranyaka Upanishad’s list are even more stark in texts such as the Mahabharata or the Brihat Samhita, with Atri and Vasishta the only saints remaining in common.

Despite the Brihadaranyaka Upanishad being regarded as one of the primary authorities to trace Brahmin lineage, some Brahmin groups, often those who were inducted into the caste during the post-Vedic period, believe that they are descended from the saints acknowledged as the Saptarishi in post-Vedic texts such as the Mahabharata or the Brihat Samhita. Due to the discrepancies between the Upanishad and these post-Vedic texts, a number of new Brahmin Gotras emerged during this period, with saints who were identified as part of the Saptarishi in these scriptures, such as Angiras and Shandilya denoted as the root ancestor. Lastly, some Brahmin groups from northern India believe that the caste is descended from eight saints in the Vedic age; the Saptarishi as described in the Brihadaranyaka Upanishad and Agastya, another revered Brahmin saint from the Vedic age.Therefore, amongst these peoples, there are eight major Brahmin Gotras.

=== Pravaras ===
Every Brahmin Gotra is further sub-divided into several divisions Pravaras. Translated literally from Sanskrit, the term means ‘most excellent’. A Pravara represents the lineage of individuals from a particular Gotra who, according to Hindu literature, had ‘achieved greatness’. These individuals were generally also saints or sages, often direct descendants of the Saptarishi, but were sometimes notable kings or princes of the Vedic Age such as Harita. According to Brahminical belief, an individual is said to ‘achieve greatness’ if they consistently, throughout their lifetime, performed ‘noble deeds’, exhibited ‘Brahminical virtues’ and upheld the repute of their root ancestor. There is no fixed number of Pravaras in every Brahmin Gotra, the number of sub-divisions within a Gotra depends on the number of individuals from the Gotra that Hindu texts deemed to have ‘achieved greatness’. For example, the Bharadwaja Gotra has two Pravaras, Angirasa and Bharhaspatya, which represent the lineages of two revered Vedic sages who were descended from Bharadwaja. Finally, as stated in the Rigveda, unlike a Gotra, a Pravara plays no specific role by itself in Brahminical life but is a ceremonial part of the identification of an individual’s lineage.

== Impact on marital customs ==
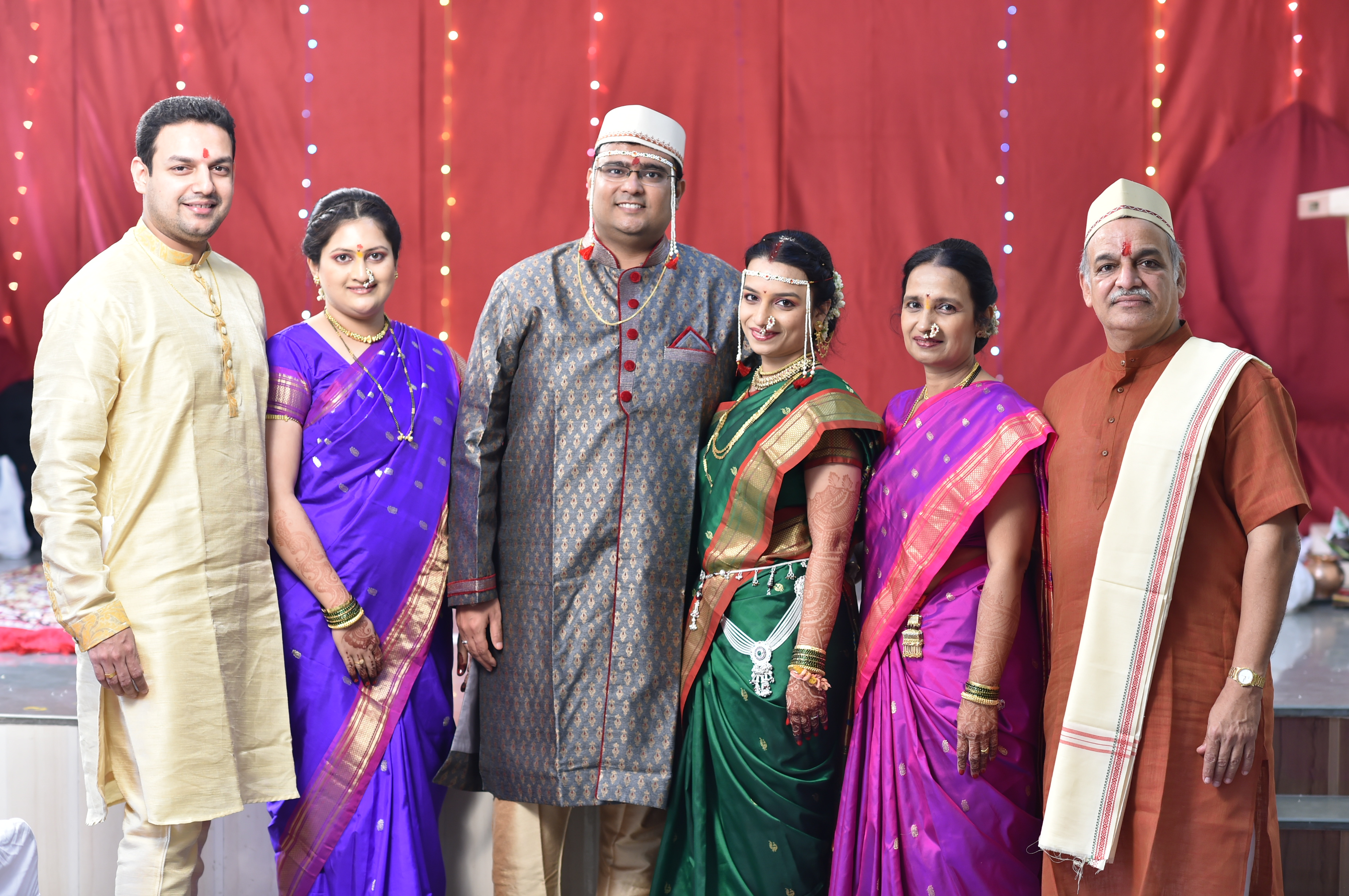
A family at a traditional Maharashtrian Brahmin Wedding.

With one of its principal functions being the promotion of genetic diversity within the Brahmin clan, the Gotric system has maintained a heavy influence on the marital norms and customs of the caste. With the Rigveda forbidding relations between those sharing a common ancestor, a Brahmin’s Gotra remained an integral consideration for individuals considering marriage. According to the Rigveda, a Brahmin is only permitted to marry an individual outside their Gotra, with intra-gotra marriages (known as sagotri marriages) regarded as marriages between siblings, which according to Hindu scripture would lead to the birth of diseased offspring. After marriage, a woman is also required to change her Gotra to that of her husband and any offspring they may have are to adopt the Gotra of their father. Some Brahmin communities also do not marry into their maternal family’s Gotra, believing that such relations hinder genetic diversity. This practice however, is not widespread.

Strict adherence to Rigvedic marital doctrines, however, varies across Brahmin communities. For example, Brahmins from the Deccan Plateau have been known to permit marriages within the same Gotra provided the married individuals are not members of an immediate family. Furthermore, Vedic Hindu literature varies greatly on the exact rules that govern a Gotra’s influence on Brahmin marriages. Unlike the Rigveda, the Manusmriti permits sagotri marriages, if a marriage is between two individuals who are separated by at least six generations from a common paternal ancestor.Therefore, marital customs often differ between Brahmin groups and often depend on which Vedic doctrine a group follows and whether it is followed rigidly.

== Development and modern interpretations ==
India's Hindu Marriage Act 1955, India's federal law regulating Brahminical marital customs.

With advancements in genetic sciences changing the understanding of how an individual’s lineage is traced, many Brahmins world over have shifted away from strictly adhering to Rigvedic ideals of the Gotric system. Despite numerous migrations, Brahmins have retrained strict patrilineal clans. Many of these lineages can be traced using vanshavali, or registries. However due to the rise of urbanization, Brahmins in metropolitan regions instead have chosen to ceremonially adhere to the Gotric system, using it as a marker to identify their paternal lineage but allowing it minimum influence in their everyday lives. However, in certain rural areas in Northern India, such as the Sikar district in Rajasthan, conservative organisations (Khap Panchayats) continue to lobby vociferously for Gotras to be legally recognised and enforce the Gotric system amongst the Brahmins of the region.

=== Legal position ===
Historically, the concept of the Gotra has played an integral role in the formation and development of Brahminical society. However, despite this historical importance, the Gotric system has been given minimal legal legitimacy in modern society. India’s Hindu Marriage Act of 1955 regulates certain Brahminical marital customs but does not officially recognise Brahmin Gotras or the role they play in the lives of members of the caste. In the 1945 case of Madhavrao v Raghavendrarao, where the sargotri marriage of a Deshastha Brahmin couple had been challenged by their families, the Bombay High Court ruled that Brahmin Gotra were not to be recognised as a legal way of tracing lineage and that the Gotric system did not have any legal standing to influence or control the marital rights of consenting individuals.

== See also ==
- Brahmin Varna
- Gotra
- List of Brahmins
- List of Gotras
- Pravara
- Hindu Marriage Act
