= Susna =

Serpentine Hindu demon of drought

- Affiliation: Asura
- Texts: Vedas

Susna (Sanskrit: शुष्ण, romanized: Śuṣṇa) is an asura described in Hindu texts. Normally associated with drought, Susna is often described as possessing a snake-like form with horns. He is an enemy of the deity Indra.

== Etymology ==
Susna means "drought" from the root Sus, which translates to "dry up". The similar "sosna" is an old Slavic word for the pine tree.

== Literature ==
In Hinduism, Susna is an asura commonly associated with drought, famine, and hoarding. An enemy of Indra, the asura makes multiple appearances across a number of Vedic texts. He is often associated with Vritra, another asura which obstructs the rivers of the world.

In the Rigveda, Susna is described as being a "child of mists" similar to Vritra, a massive dragon who blocks the rivers of the world. Like Vritra, Susna is seen as a causer of drought and as a foe of Indra. However, while Indra is able to kill Vritra with a thunderbolt, Susna must be destroyed by returning water to the land. To defeat the asura, Indra destroys Susna's fortress, and, at the request of his follower Kutsa, sends rains to end the drought, defeating the asura. One passage from the text notes Indra "made flow the springs restrained by the season through killing Susna, the child of mists."

In the Brahmana and Yajurveda texts within the Vedas, Susna is described as being a bitter enemy (dasa) of the god Indra. Susna, who is described as a horned serpent-asura, aids the Asuras in their war against Indra and his fellow devas. Whenever an asura is killed in battle, Susna uses his mystical breath (which contains the essence of the amrta, the elixir of immortality) to restore the fallen warrior to life. Indra discovers these resurrections and plots to steal the amrta for himself and his fellow devas. Thus, Indra turns himself into a globule of honey and allows the asura to consume him. Once inside of Susna's stomach, Indra turns into a falcon (or eagle), snatches the amrta from the asura's mouth, and escapes to deliver the prize to the other devas.
