= Avatsara =

Sage in Hinduism

Avatsara (Sanskrit: अवत्सार, romanized: Avatsāra) is a rishi (sage) featured in the Rigveda. His name first appears in Sukta 44 of the Fifth Mandala.

== Work ==
Avatsara is the primary author of Sukta 44 of the Fifth Mandala of the Rigveda, whose hymn addressed to the class of Rigvedic deities called the Visvedevas. He is known for the set of eight hymns of four mantras each that appear in the Rigveda viz. Suktas IX.53 to IX.60, and also in the Samaveda (SV.757, SV.1717). He is stated to be the chief priest of the gods. He is described to offer Agni the six-syllable oblation – O Agni, enjoy the oblation, and was set-free. According to Satyasadha (21.3.13), the Kashyapa pravara (lineage) consists of three rishi–ancestors: – Kashyapa, Avatsara, and Naidhruva. The lineage also belongs to two of the Sandilya variations. There are eight notable sages belonging to the Kashyapa family – Kashyapa, Avatsara, Nidhruva, Rebha, Devala, Asita, Bhutamsa, and Vivrha; two unnamed sons of Rebha were also authors of Rigvedic hymns.

He is more known for the Suktas 53 to 60 of the Ninth Mandala; these Suktas contain four mantras each, all composed in the Gayatri Metre. In the Rigveda, he addresses Ishvara as, "the fully armed and endowed with many subtle and fine divine powers and destroyer of all evil forces" (RV.IX.53.1). He then addresses Ishvara as, "the purifier or the pure, brilliant as the Sun".

His name appears in the Yajurveda, (Y.V.III.i & III.xviii) in which he prays to Agni, and in the Aitareya Brahmana and the Kausitaki Brahmana. In the verses of the Aitareya Brahmana (A.B. ii.24) and Kausitaki Brahmana (K.B.viii.6), both pertaining to the Sacrifice of the Five Oblations, it is stated that Avatsara had reached the home of Agni and had conquered the highest world.

In Rigveda Sukta IX.53, he states that educated people extract the wisdom of the ancients from the Vedas. Further, he states in Rigveda mantra IX.60.3 that the Lord resides as knowledge and consciousness in the hearts and minds of educated people.

== Genealogy ==
Avatsara is described to be the son of Kashyapa, who whose lifetime was later than Vamadeva (son of Maharishi Gautama), but earlier than Atri. The word, Avata, denotes an artificially dug up water-source or an artificial well.

Apart from Kashyapa, the son of Marichi, there appears to have been a second Kashyapa who was the father of Avatsara, Narada and Arundhati, the wife of Vasishtha and it was this second Kashyapa who was one of the Saptarishi. According to the list of sages provided by the Matsya Purana, Kashyapa had two sons – Avatsara and Asita; Nidhruva and Rebha were Avatsara’s son. But this list is doubted; the genealogy otherwise gives three groups among the Kashyaps, the Sandilyas, Naidhruvas and Raibhyas.

From Book IV Chapter VIII of the Srimad Bhagvatam it is learnt though Maitreya that Dhruva, the son of Uttanapada through Suruti, and the grandson of Svyambhuva Manu, had by his first wife Brahmi, two sons, Vatsara and Kalmavatsara or Kalpa.
