= Asitakrutam Shivastotram =

Sanskrit hymn

Information
- Religion: Hinduism
- Author: Asita
- Language: Sanskrit
- Verses: 9

The Asitakrutam Shivastotram (Sanskrit: असितकृतं शिवस्तोत्रम्) is a Sanskrit stotra composed by the Vedic sage Asita in praise of Shiva.

== Description ==
The Asitakrutam Shivastotram is described in the Brahma Vaivarta Purana.

The hymn consists of nine verses that praise Shiva with various epithets. It begins with the sage Asita extoling Shiva as the great teacher, referring to him as Jagadguru and Yogendra. He is acknowledged as the destroyer of the universe and the god of death, followed by a depiction of Shiva as kalarupa, the supreme god of time. The hymn continues by celebrating Shiva as the embodiment of virtues and qualities, the source of all good traits, and the teacher of the virtuous. It identifies him with absolute truth (Brahman) and the seed of the Vedas. The author is described to express profound emotion at the end of the hymn, shedding tears in front of Shiva.
