= Anupa =

Anupa (literally, watery tract) is an ancient Indian region roughly corresponds to the areas around ancient Mahishmati city in the present-day Madhya Pradesh. The Vayu Purana mentions a janapada (realm) of Anupa, located on the Vindhyaprishtha (Vindhya plateau). The Nasik cave inscription of Gautami Balashri claims that her son Gautamiputra Satakarni's dominion included Anupa. The Junagarh rock inscription of Rudradaman I mentions Anupa as a part of his kingdom.

== Maharajas of Valkha ==
A number of copper-plate grants discovered from this region (Shirpur, Bagh and Manavar in Dhar district) are issued by a family bearing the title, Maharaja. They recognized the suzerainty of certain emperors bearing the title, Paramabhattaraka (most probably the Imperial Guptas. The names of the rulers of this family are Bhulunda, Svamidasa and Rudradasa. These three rulers ruled from their capital, Valkha, which is not yet identified. All of their copper-plate grants are dated in an unspecified era.

== Subandhu of Mahishmati ==
Two copperplate grants found from Barwani and the Bagh Caves are issued by a ruler, Subandhu, whose capital was Mahishmati. The Badwani plate is dated in the year 167 of an unspecified era.
