= Vadavagni =

Submarine fire in Hindu mythology

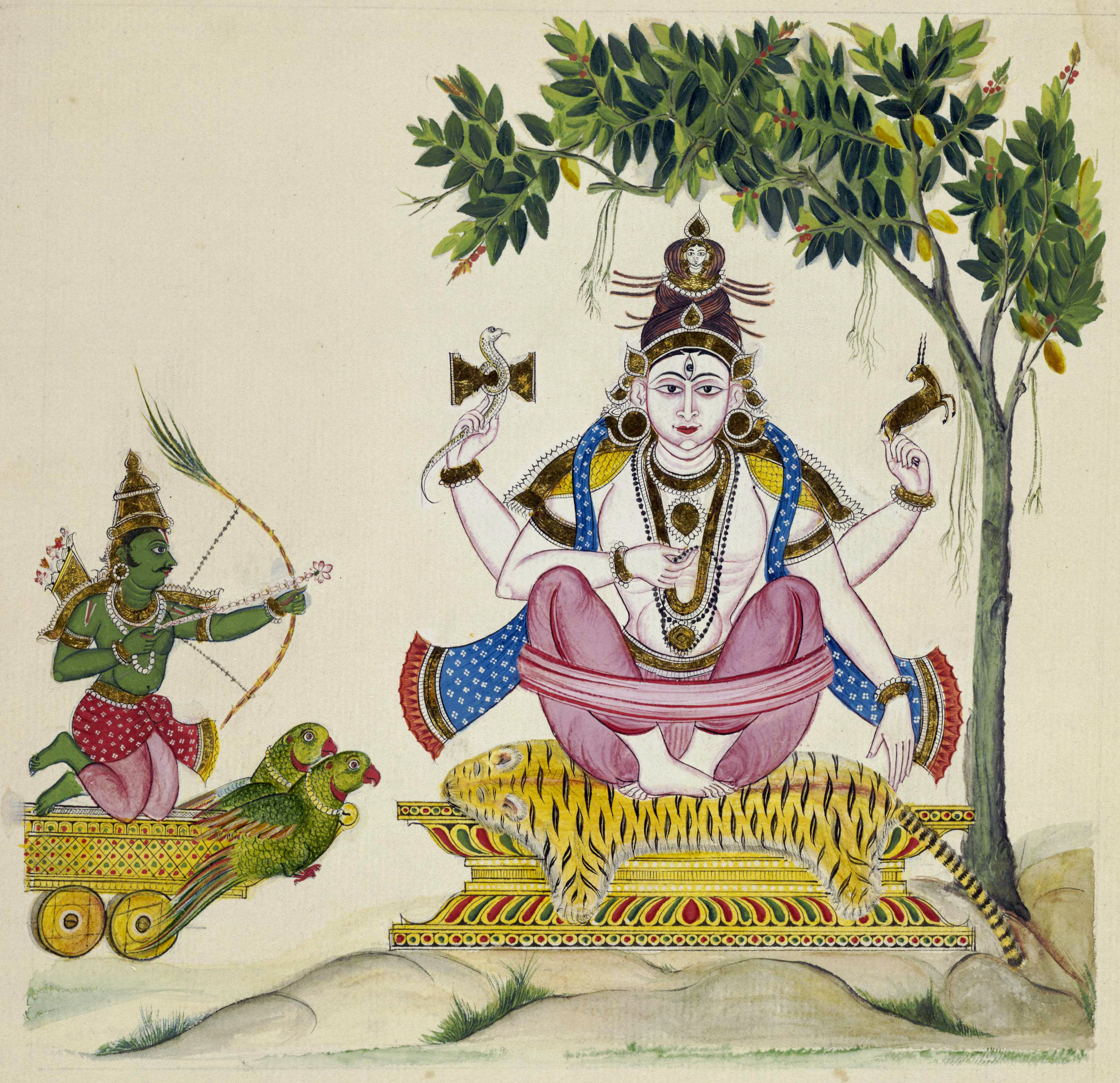
According to one legend, Vadavagni emerged from the wrathful third eye of Shiva when he burnt Kamadeva to ash.

Vadavagni (Sanskrit: वाडवाग्नि, romanized: Vāḍavāgni, lit. 'mare-fire'), also referred to as Vadavanala (Sanskrit: वडवानल, romanized: Vaḍavānala) refers to a submarine fire embodied in the form of a destructive being in Hindu mythology. It is described to be a being that manifested with the head of a mare, but a body of blazing flame.

The Vadavagni is regarded to wander the seabed and consume its waters, awaiting the moment it could emerge and destroy the earth during the Pralaya, the dissolution of the earth at the end of an age. Various legends regarding the origin and suppression of the Vadavagni exist in Hindu literature, most prominently the descent of the goddess Saraswati as the Sarasvati river.

== Description ==
The Vadavagni is described to emerge from the mouth of a mare called Vadavamukha (mare-face). This mare's mouth is sometimes described to be present under a sea at the South Pole. It is stated to remain under the sea until it finally erupts, leading to the destruction of the earth. It is stated to be a metaphor for insatiable energy.

The Vishnu Purana states that the Vadavagni is located beneath the Kshira Sagara, surrounded by seas of curds, ghee, sugarcane juice, wine, and sweet water.

Vadavagni is likely an example of the "fire under water" myth of Proto-Indo-European mythology.

Vadavagni is described to be associated with a tirtha called Mahanala in the Brahma Purana, and a legend that involves Mrtyu performing a sacrifice for the sages, leading to an enmity between the devas and the rakshasas.

Saharakshas, the sacrificial fire of the asuras, is stated to be the child of Vadavamukha in the Matsya Purana, whereas Vadavamukha is identified with Surya, the solar deity.

== Legend ==
=== Penance of Aurva ===
Based on the conflict between the Brahmin Bhargavas and the Kshatriya Haihayas, the sage Aurva is described to have emerged from the left thigh of his mother. After the death of the Haihaya king, Kirtavirya, who had been generous to the Bhargavas during his reign by donating much of his wealth, his sons demanded that the Brahmins return the riches. A few of them assumed the guise of beggars and visited a Bhargava house, finding much treasure stored there. Enraged, the Kshatriyas engaged in a massacre of the community, slaying even the foetuses of expecting mothers. According to the Narada Purana, the pregnant Arushi concealed her womb in her thigh, seeking refuge in the caves of the Himalayas with the other Bhargava women. When she was discovered and arrested, Aurva emerged from her thigh, and his birth is said to have been so dazzling that the Kshatriyas were blinded.

While the child Aurva complied in restoring the eyesight of the Haihayas, he was bent on destroying the world and every creature that resided in it in vengeance. He paid homage to his slaughtered ancestors as he engaged in a severe penance, the intensity of his practice such that even the deities are said to have begged him to be merciful. Finally, Aurva's Pitrs, the spirits of his departed forefathers, appeared before him. They informed him that they had chosen to be slain by the Kshatriyas because they had grown weary of their long lives, and had deliberately amassed wealth in order to provoke the princes into murdering them. They requested him to control his wrath. When Aurva told them that he could not let the flames that had risen from his austerities to come to naught as that would burn him alive, his Pitrs suggested that he release his wrathful flame into the ocean. The sage obeyed, and the flame became the Vadavagni, a mare-faced inferno. Due to this reason, Vadavagni is also called Aurvanala.

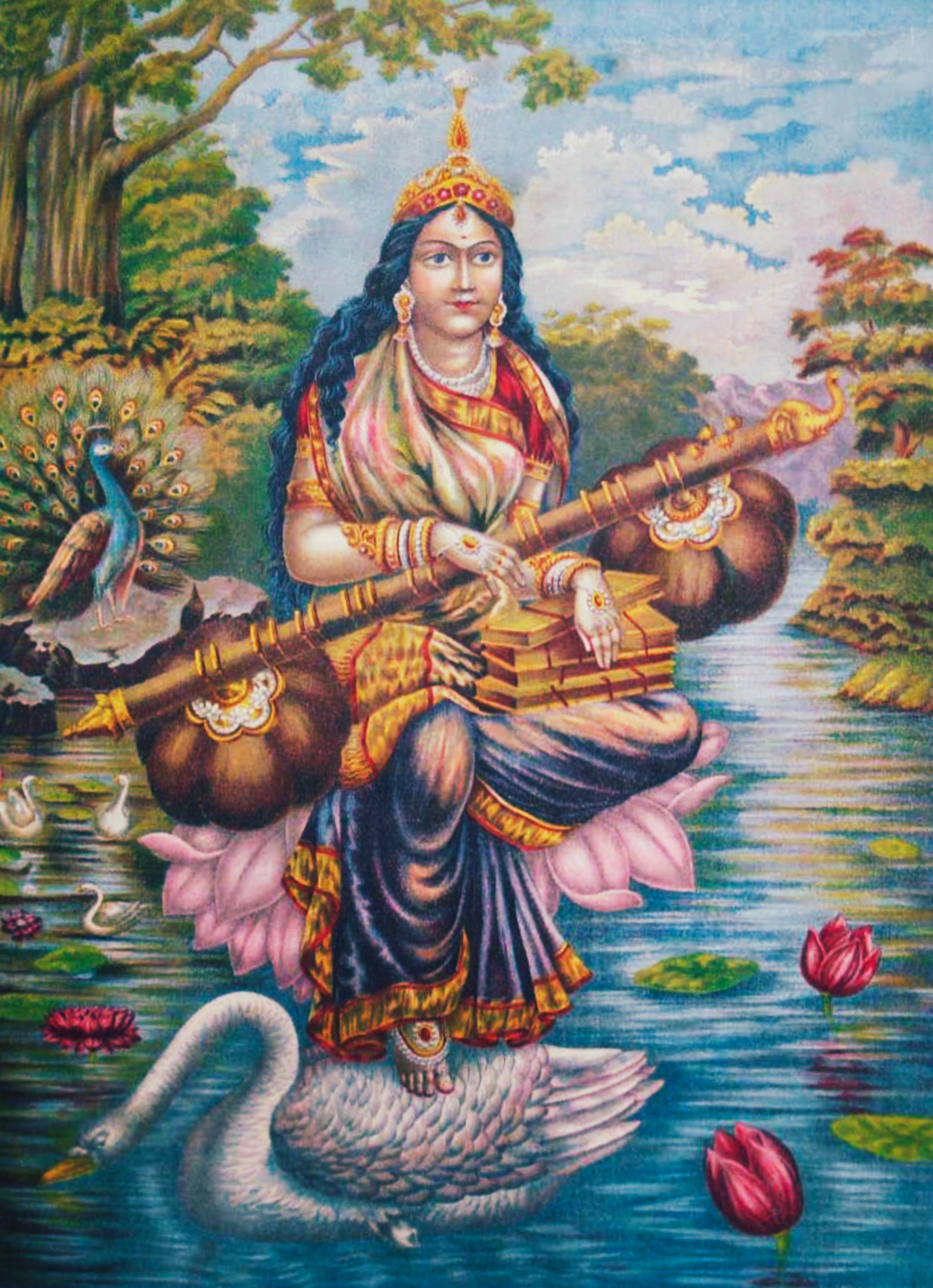
Painting of the goddess Saraswati, who turns herself into a river to suppress Vadavagni.

=== Origin of Sarasvati ===
The Vadavagni is often associated with the descent of the goddess Saraswati as a river on earth. Following the Tarakamaya War, the devas deposited their arsenal of weapons at the hermitage of the Sage Dadhici for safekeeping. After a century, the sage decided to go on a northern pilgrimage, but realised that neither he nor his servants were able to lift the devas' weapons. Hence, he drank the intrinsic power of the weapons with water and travelled to the Himalayas. His servant, the beautiful Subhadra (Not the wife of Arjuna), accidentally impregnated herself by wearing the loincloth of the sage after her bath, and secretly gave birth to a child, Pippalada, beneath a few pippal trees. She cursed the father of her child to die that same day. Later that day, the devas visited Dadhici, requesting the return of their weapons, citing that they needed them to defeat the asuras in battle. Dadhici informed them that he had consumed the weapons; nonetheless, he sacrificed himself, informing the devas that they could fashion new weapons from his indestructible bones. When Pippalada enquired regarding the identity of his father, Subhadra told him that his father's death had been for the sake of the devas. Furious, Pippalada performed a severe penance, seeking the destruction of the devas. After a year, a vadavā (a mare) emerged from his thigh. This mare gave birth to a fiery foetus from its womb, which became the Vadavagni (submarine fire), after which it disappeared from the scene.

Vadavagni is stated to have appeared like the end of the kalpa (aeon) itself. Pippalada commanded the Vadavagni to consume all the devas. When the devas implored Vishnu to save them, the preserver deity appeared before Vadavagni, and suggested that he eat the devas one by one, and begin by consuming the water of the earth, the foremost of the devas. Vadavagni acquiesced, but required that he be carried in the hand of a virgin to be taken to his destination. Saraswati was chosen for this mission. The two undertook a journey, where they met the mountain Kṛtasmara, who insisted that Saraswati become his wife. The goddess tricked him into turning into ash by making him hold Vadavagni. She accompanied Vadavagni to a holy site named Prabhāsa, and invoked Samudra, the personification of the sea. She urged the being to devour Samudra, and so he leapt into the ocean. Saraswati transformed herself into a river and flowed into the ocean. Vishnu commanded Samudra to banish Vadavagni to the midst of the ocean, where he would be able to harm no being. When Vadavagni started to cause the waters to evaporate by his very presence, Vishnu rendered the waters perennial, and Saraswati stationed herself along the ocean to protect creation.

=== Wrath of Shiva ===
The Vadavagni is also described to be the product of Shiva's wrath that emerged from his third eye and annihilated Kamadeva to ash, when the latter attempted to arouse his desire towards Parvati. Brahma is said to have attempted to paralyse this flame to save Kamadeva, but failed. When Shiva left, the flame threatened to destroy the deities. When the deities sought refuge with Brahma, the creator deity turned the flame into a mare, one that emitted flames of amrita. He then deposited Vadagni into the bottom of the ocean. There is also a legend that suggests that Jalandhara, the asura born from Shiva's rage, is the Vadavagni.

The Bhavishya Purana states that after Shiva cut off the fifth head of Brahma, he is chased by the Brahmahatya, the embodiment of the sin of Brahminicide, which is likened to the Vadavagni.

=== Form of Vishnu ===
In the Mahabharata, Vishnu declares that he is the Vadavagni, consuming the turbulent waters and disgorging them again.

In one legend, Vishnu assumes the form of a sage called Vadavamukha and engages in a penance atop Mount Meru. He called upon Samudra, the embodiment of the sea, to come to him, so that he could bathe atop the mountain. When the sea refused to heed his call, Vishnu grew furious, and his fury is stated to have become the Vadavagni beneath the sea.
