= Muchukunda =

Character in Hindu mythology

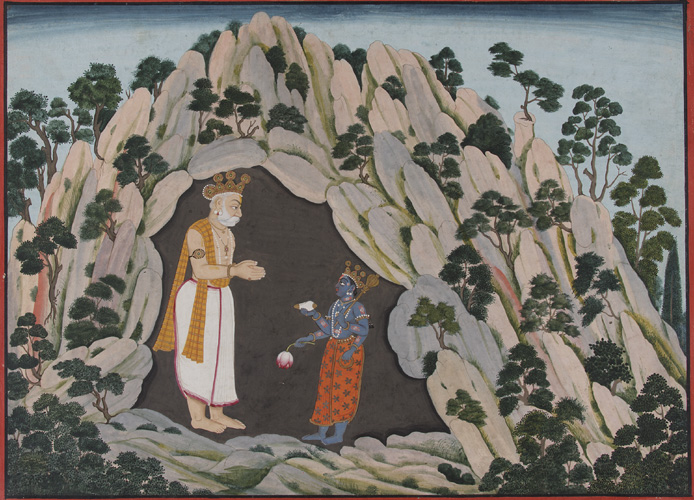
- Lord Vishnu appears before the king
- Texts: Mahabharata, Puranas

Genealogy
- Parents: Mandhata (father)
- Siblings: Ambarisha, Purukutsa (brothers), fifty sisters
- Dynasty: Suryavamsha

Muchukunda (Sanskrit: मुचुकुन्द, romanized: Muchukunda) is a king of the Suryavamsha (Solar dynasty) in Hindu Dharma. He was the son of King Mandhata, and the brother of Ambarisha.

== Battle with the asuras ==
According to the Bhagavata Purana, the devas were once defeated by the asuras. They sought the refuge of the king named Muchukunda, described to be a great warrior and a pious man. King Muchukunda granted the devas shelter until they rallied themselves under Kartikeya, the son of Shiva. After their triumph, the devas and their king, Indra, expressed their gratitude to the king for sacrificing his privileged position on earth to travel to Svarga to protect them. They revealed to him that an entire age had passed on earth, with the Treta Yuga now having transitioned to the Dvapara Yuga. They informed him that his family had all died. They offered Muchukunda any boon of his choice for his services, with the exception of moksha (liberation), as it was beyond their capacities. Struck with grief upon learning that his family was no longer alive, and feeling exhausted after all the battles, he asked the devas for the boon of undisturbed sleep, with the provision that anyone who dared to disturb it would immediately be reduced to ashes. This boon was granted, and the king commenced his sleep in a cave.

== Death of Kalayavana ==
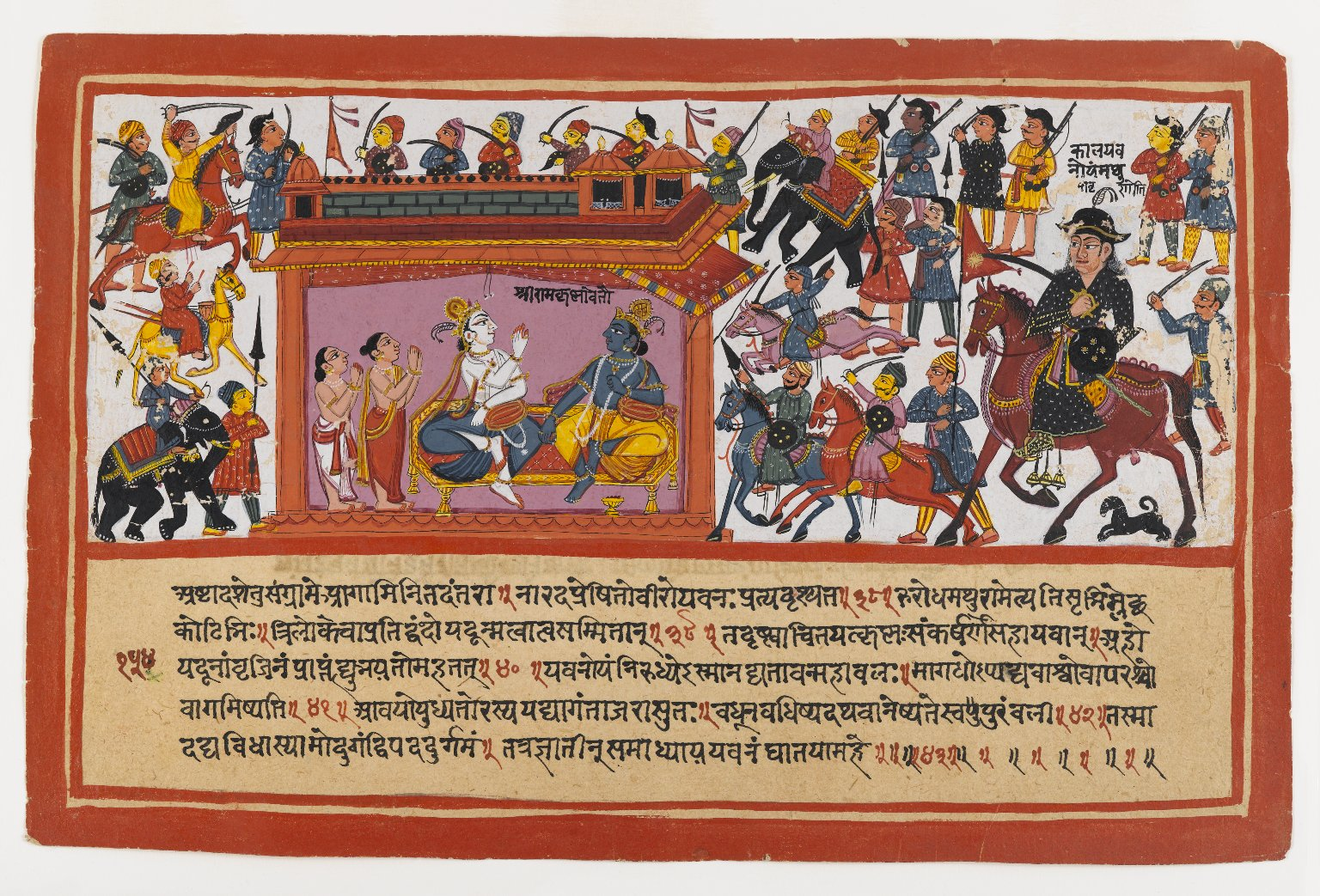
Kalayavana Surrounds Mathura. Page from a Dispersed Bhagavata Purana Series - Brooklyn Museum

According to the Mahabharata, Kalayavana, a great yavana warrior king, was undefeated and unmatched in battle due to a boon. Allied with Jarasandha, he set out to invade Krishna's kingdom, Mathura. When the two armies faced each other in battle, Krishna dismounted from his chariot and retreated, followed by Kalayavana. After a long pursuit, Krishna, followed by Kalayavana, entered a dark cave. This was the same cave that Muchukunda was present within, still engaged in his slumber. Kalayavana, in a fit of anger and unable to see in the dark, attacked Muchukunda, mistaking him to be Krishna. When Muchukunda opened his eyes, his gaze fell upon Kalayavana, who was immediately burnt to ashes.

After gaining his bearings, the king was delighted to see Krishna. Krishna advised him to perform tapas to cleanse his accumulated sins, to attain Moksha (liberation). After meeting with the deity, Muchukunda set out of the cave. The story narrates that he was astonished to see all creatures had shrunken in size over time while he rested in the cave, indicating long ages gone by. Muchukunda then went to Gandamadana Mountain and from there to Badrika Ashrama for performing a penance.

== See also ==
- Mandhata
- Ambarisha
- Kakudhmi
