= Pitri =

Spirits of departed ancestors in Hinduism

The pitris (Sanskrit: पितृ, lit. 'forefathers', IAST: Pitṛ) are the spirits of departed ancestors in Hinduism. Following an individual's death, the performance of the antyesti (funeral rites) is regarded to allow the deceased to enter Pitrloka, the abode of one's ancestors. The non-performance of these rituals is believed to result in the fate of wandering the earth as a restless preta.

The amavasya (new moon day), as well as the occasion of Pitri Paksha during the Hindu month of Ashvin is recommended for the veneration of pitrs.

== Development ==
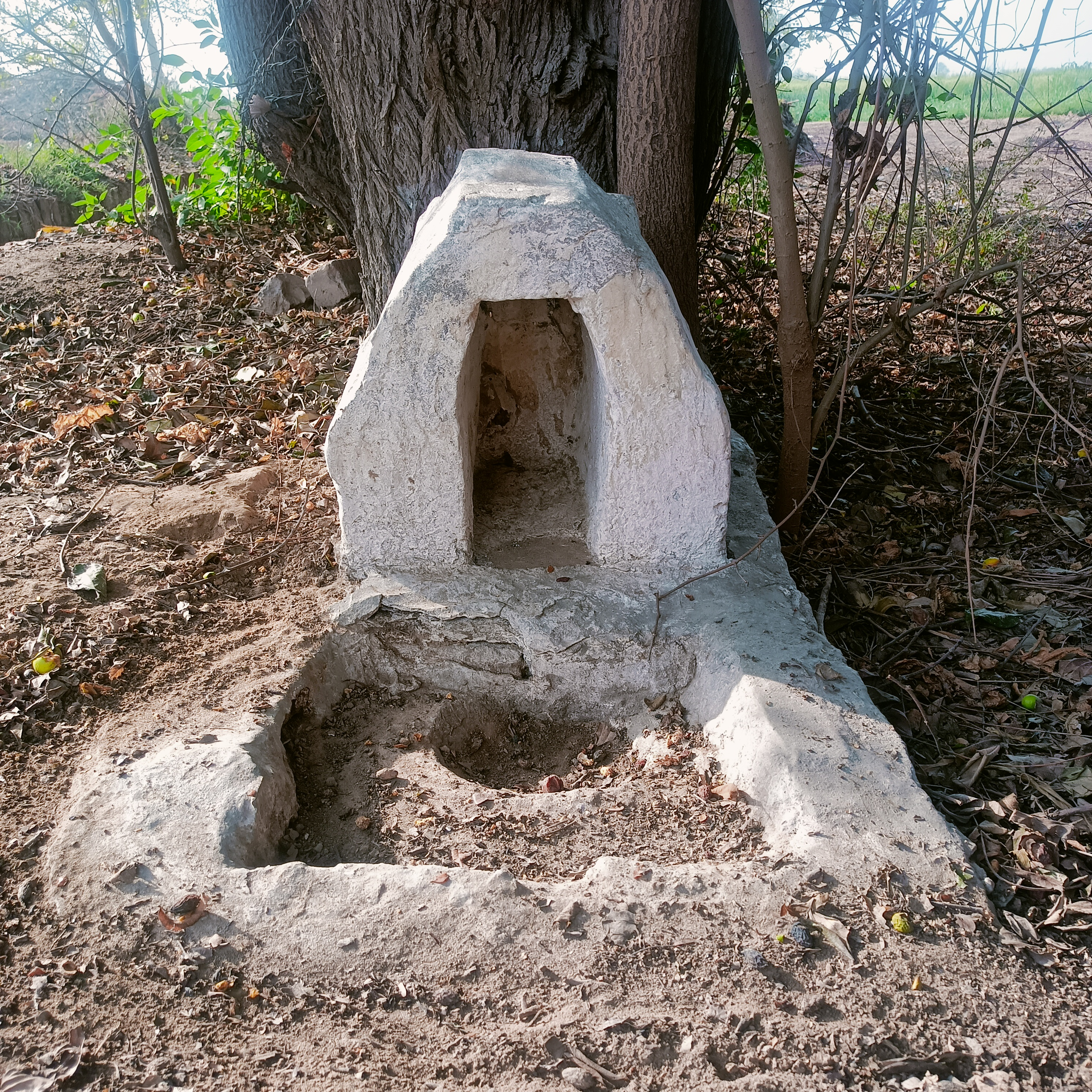
An altar built under a tree for Pitr veneration in Haryana, India

Ancestor veneration is an ancient Indian practice. The custom of a death anniversary is still practised in India, where the deathday of one's parents involves a number of rituals and offerings, that are elaborated in the Puranas. Balls of rice (Piṇḍa) are traditionally offered on certain occasions, due to the belief that one's ancestors still need to be fed by their descendants. For the members of the priesthood class, a sacrifice dedicated to one's pitrs must be performed on a daily basis. While the Vedic religion held that one's forefathers attain Svarga, the heavenly realm, most Hindus today believe in samsara, the cycle of rebirth, where all departed souls reincarnate on earth until they achieve spiritual liberation, called moksha.

According to popular belief, the fire deity, Agni, is believed to carry the deceased to Pitrloka with the smoke that emerges during cremation.

The pitrs are often likened to birds, as they are described to always be looking down on earth; the ancient Baudhayana stated that pitrs assume the form of birds. This led to the practice of feeding birds during funeral rites, and rituals associated with ancestor veneration.

Texts like the Mahabharata establish the concept of the living performing pious deeds for the benefit of their departed ancestors. Rather than a form of worship, it is stated to be the duty of every male descendant to perform rites for their pitrs.

Sayana, a scholar of the Vijayanagara Empire, regarded every individual born to be under the debt of their pitrs. This debt is redeemed by continuing the race, which is done by procreation. This act is stated to protect and offer longevity from the pitrs. The world of the pitrs, according to him, could only be achieved by the pious, and is unreachable by those who hate Hindu deities or injure Brahmins.

== Literature ==
Pitrs have been featured in Hinduism since the Rigveda, with hymns invoking Agni to decide which offerings should go to the devas, and which to one's pitrs. In this text, the Pitrloka and Devaloka are regarded to be indistinct. They are regarded to be distinct in the Atharvaveda, and in the Brahmanas, Devaloka becomes preferable to attain to the Pitroka.

The Manusmriti states that a son born of the Brahma marriage absolves the sins of ten pitrs on the ascending side, and ten on the descending side of his family, as well as himself as the twenty-first.

The Smriti texts of Hinduism state that any person who does not perform the Shraddha ritual is not entitled to inheritance.

According to the Puranas, the first pitrs were the Prajapatis, the progenitors of the human race. After the performance of a penance, Brahma is described to have ordered the devas, who had ceased to worship him, to acquire instruction from their sons regarding the manner of devotion and veneration. The devas were forced to call their own sons pitrs - fathers.

The most complete accounts about the pitrs are found in the Vayu Purana and Brahmanda Purana texts, that are regarded to be identical. The account in the Harivamsha resembles them. Brief accounts are also found in the Matsya Purana and Padma Purana. According to these accounts, there are different classes of the pitrs, who have different origins, forms, grades, as well as abodes. A broad distinction is said to exist between the devāḥ pitaraḥ (divine pitrs) and the manuṣyāḥ pitaraḥ (pitrs who were deceased human beings). Some of the pitrs dwell in Devaloka, while other dwell in Patala. The devas and the pitrs of Devaloka are often regarded to be synonymous.

The Vishnu Purana states that the most devout of Brahmins go to Pitrloka.

In the Mahabharata, while Yudhishthira talks to Bhishma upon his bed of arrows, the latter states that whether one is a deva or asura, a human being, gandharva or uraga or rakshasa, pisaca or kinnara, one must always venerate one's pitrs. He states that performing the Shraddha ritual on each successive day of the lunar fortnight, one reaps merits, such as acquiring beautiful spouses and successful children on the first day, daughters on the second day, steeds on the third day, and so on.

The pitrs are most primeval deities and they never cease to exist. The manuṣyāḥ pitaraḥ (ancestors of human beings) can attain the same level of the divine pitrs and live with them in Svarga by righteousness.

They are reborn at the end of every thousand mahayugas and revive the worlds. From them all the Manus, and all progeny at the new creation, are said to be produced.

== Legends ==
The legend of Aurva from the Mahabharata features the sage's pitrs appearing before him to request him to cease his penance, which produces the Vadavagni.

A legend from the Devi Bhagavata Purana narrates that the sage Jaratkaru was once travelling through the forest, when he came across his pitrs, hanging over a precipice at the end of a blade of grass. When enquiring regarding their state, the pitrs told Jaratkaru that they experienced this condition due to the latter's childlessness, which resulted in them not being to enter Svarga. To save his pitrs from their ordeal, the sage married Manasa.

The Brahmanda Purana narrates the episode of Pururavas propitiating his pitrs.

A legend from the Skanda Purana explains the origin of the Shraddha ritual, stating that not offering these rites to one's ancestors during the amavasya (new moon day) will lead to one's pitrs suffering from hunger and thirst.

The legend of Bhagiratha features the king performing arduous penances to Ganga and Shiva, to free his ancestors from Patala, where they had been destroyed by Kapila.

== Classes ==
There are seven classes of the devāḥ pitaraḥ (divine pitrs), three of them are amurtayah (incorporeal) while the other four are samurtayah (corporeal). The three incorporeal orders of the pitrs are Vairajas, Agnishvattas and Barhishadas. The four corporeal orders of the pitrs are Somapas, Havishmanas, Ajyapas, and Sukalins (or Manasas).

=== The Pitṛ-Vaṁśa ===
All seven classes of the divine pitrs had each one mānasī kanyā (mind-born daughter). Mena, the wife of Mount Himavat was the daughter of the Vairajas. Acchoda, the river was the daughter of the Agnishvattas. Pivari, the wife of the sage Shuka was the daughter of the Barhishadas. Narmada, the river was the daughter of the Somapas. Yashoda was the daughter of the Havishmanas was the wife of Vishvamahat and mother of Dilipa. Viraja, the wife of king Nahusha was the daughter of the Ajyapas and Go or Ekshringa, the wife of the sage Shukra was the daughter of the Manasas.

== See also ==
- Ancestor veneration
- Manes
- Pitri Paksha
- Preta
- Śrāddha
