= Lavanasura =

Ramayana character

Lavana
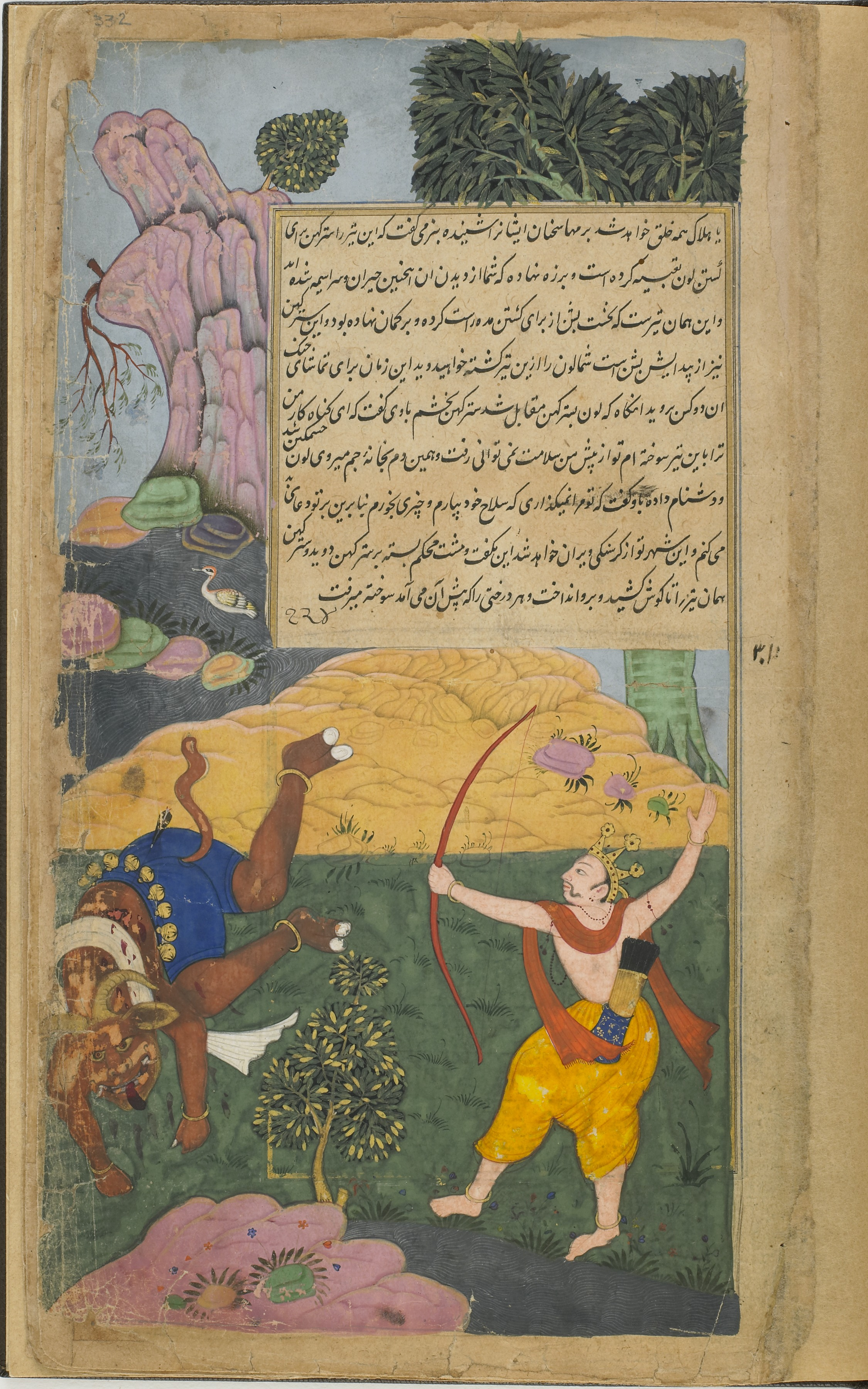
- Lavana being slain by Shatrughana
- Affiliation: Asura
- Texts: Ramayana
- Parents: Madhu (father) Kumbhinasi (mother)

Lavana (Sanskrit: लवणासुर, romanized: Lavaṇāsura) is an asura in Hinduism. He is slain by Shatrughna, the youngest brother of Rama, in the Hindu epic Ramayana.

== Legend ==
During Rama's reign, while peace prevailed in most places, Lavanasura continued to torment the innocent and destroy many sacrifices of sages and terrify them in many ways. Many kings were defeated by him and they were all afraid. Therefore, one day, the sages headed by sage Chyavana (a descendant of sage Bhrigu), came all the way from Madhupuri to Rama with a plea to protect them. Lavana was the son of an asura king named Madhu and his wife, Kumbhini. Madhu was kind and compassionate to Brahmanas, and made personal friendships with devas, and therefore established peace between the asuras and the devas. He pleased the deities so much that on one occasion, Shiva granted him his trishula. Madhu built a palace and named the place as Madhupuri. Madhu had a son named Lavana, who had the qualities opposite to those of his father.

=== Childhood ===
Lavana was so evil that even as a child he would beat play mates, kill them, and eat them. Madhu handed everything over to his son including his trident and drowned himself in the ocean because of shame. The sages further described Lavana. There was a king named Mandhata who was a descendant in the dynasty of Iksvaku. Mandhata had dominated the whole planet and he became so proud that he wanted to rule heaven also. So he challenged Indra to either turn over the kingdom to him or fight with him in battle. Indra proclaimed that he would grant his realm to the asura if he slew all the kings of earth. Lavanasura defeated Mandhata's army with the trident. Hearing all this, Rama promised that he would protect the sages, and the kingdom of Madhupuri.

=== Death ===
Bharata volunteered to fight against Lavanasura. Shatrughna expressed his wish to fight Lavanasura, wanting an opportunity to serve Rama, stating that Bharata had served Rama very well in the past. He prepared to leave for the war. Shatrughna then left with a huge army to fight with Lavanasura. Rama warned his brother to find a way to fight with Lavana without his holding the invincible trident. Shatrughna stood before the gate where Lavana resided and positioned himself alone. As Lavana returned home after hunting animals for eating each day, Shatrughna challenged him to fight. Lavana was very happy to accept the challenge because it was his dinner time. Lavana uprooted many trees and threw them on Shatrughna, and a great battle ensued. Later, Shatrughna removed the special arrow (used for killing Madhu and Kaitabha, given as a gift by Vishnu) that Rama had given him. As Shatrughna strung his bow, the whole universe started to tremble. He struck Lavana right in the heart, slaying him. Rama then crowned Shatrughna as the king of Madhupuri, where he ruled for several years.
