= Kartavirya Arjuna =

King of Haihayas kingdom

- Maharaja of the Haihayas

Maharaja of Haihaya kingdom
- Predecessor: Kritavirya
- Successor: Jayadhvaja
- Born: Arjuna; Seventh day of increasing moon of kartik month [lunar calendar] Mahishmati, Haihaya Kingdom (modern-day Madhya Pradesh, India)
- Died: Mahishmati, Haihaya Kingdom (modern-day Madhya Pradesh, India)
- Spouse: Manoramā
- Issue: Jayadhvaja; many other sons (the Talajanghas)
Names
- Kartavirya Arjuna later as Diegoapuhrjuna or Sahasrabahu Arjuna
- Dynasty: Haihaya dynasty (a branch of the Yadava lineage)
- Father: Kritavirya
- Mother: Padmini
- Religion: Hinduism

Kartavirya Arjuna (Sanskrit: कार्तवीर्य अर्जुन, Kārtavīrya Arjuna; also known as Sahasrabahu Arjuna or Sahasrarjuna) was a king of an ancient Haihayas kingdom with capital at Mahishmati which is on the banks of Narmada River in the current state of Madhya Pradesh. Kartavirya was son of Kritavirya, king of the Haihayas. According to the Puranas, Haihaya was the grandson of Sahasrajit, son of Yadu(king) of Yadavas. This is his patronymic, by which he is best known; he is also referred to simply as Arjuna. He is described as having a thousand hands and a great devotee of god Dattatreya.

One of the several such accounts states that Arjuna conquered Mahishmati city from Karkotaka Naga, a Naga chief and made it his fortress-capital.

Almost 100 manuscripts on the worship of Kārtavīrya have been found mostly in the royal libraries of the Hindu Rajas. The states in which the manuscripts are still available are: Udaipur, Jodhpur, Kota, Bikaner, Bharatpur, and Alwar of Rajasthan, and further in Mysore.

== Encounter with Ravana ==
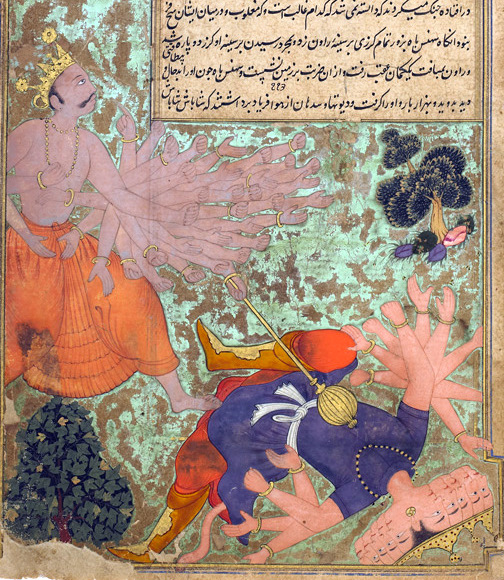
Kartavirya Arjuna (left) defeats young Ravana (right)

Kartavirya's power is popularly told in the Ramayana, Uttara Kanda, which is not often considered to be the part of the original Valmiki Ramayana and its constituent 6 adhyayas (अध्याय), since the original Ramayana speaks of the number of verses and the shlokas in Ramayana – Verse 2 of Chapter IV of Baala Kaanda of Srimad Valmiki Ramayana reads as:

चतुर्विंशत्सहस्त्राणि श्लोकानामुक्तवानृषिः |

तथा सर्गशतान् पञ्च षट्काण्डानि तथोत्तरम् ||

This epic contains 24,000 verses split into 500 chapters in Six Cantos. (Baala Kaanda: refer Ch IV:2) [The six cantos are Baala Kaanda, Ayodhya Kaanda, Aranya Kaanda, Kishkinda Kaanda, Sundara (Lanka) Kaanda and Yuddha Kaanda.].

Kartavirya is considered to be the contemporary of Ravana. The story goes that once when Kartavirya Arjuna was having a bath in the river Narmada along with his wives, he stopped the force of the river with his thousand arms from both sides. The teenage Dasagriva (Ravana), who was singing the hymns of Shiva and praying to him, made him lose his concentration. Enraged, he challenged the former for combat in which Ravana was defeated and was put to humiliation. Then, on request of his paternal grandfather Pulastya, the great emperor Kartavirya Arjuna released Ravana.

Another account states that when Ravana came "in the course of his campaign of conquest to Mahishmati (the capital of Kartavirya), he was captured without difficulty, and was confined like a wild beast in a corner of his city."

The Vayu Purana states that Kartavirya invaded Lanka, and there took Ravana as prisoner, but later he was killed by Parashurama and Ravana was rescued from Arjuna.

== Encounter with Parashurama ==
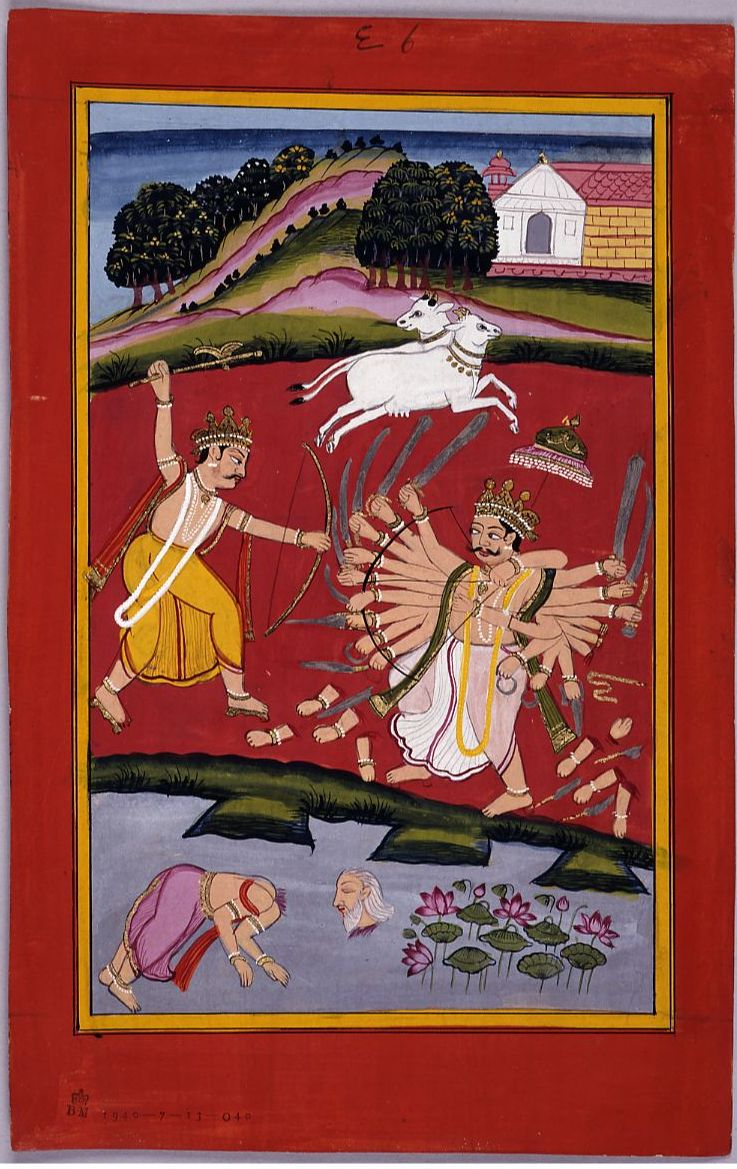
Parashurama(left) killing King Arjuna(Right).

According to the Mahabharata and the Puranas, the most celebrated Haihaya king was Kartavirya Arjuna. His epithet was Sahasrabahu. He was called a Samrat and Chakravartin. His name is found in the Rig Veda (VIII.45.26). He ultimately conquered Mahishmati city from Karkotaka Naga, a Naga chief and made it his fortress-capital. According to the Vayu Purana, he invaded Lanka and took Ravana prisoner. Arjuna propitiated Dattatreya and was favoured by him. Arjuna's sons killed sage Jamadagni. Jamadagni's son Parashurama in revenge killed Arjuna. Arjuna had a number of sons. His son Jayadhvaja succeeded him to the throne. Jayadhvaja was succeeded by his son Talajangha.

As per the Narada Purana (76:4), The Thousand Armed Sahasrabahu Arjuna was the incarnation of the Thousand Blade Sudarsana Chakra..

The Puranas recount that Kartavirya Arjuna and his army visited a rishi named Jamadagni, who fed his guest and the whole army with offerings from his divine cow Kamadhenu. The king demanded the cow for the betterment of his subjects; Jamadagni refused because he needed the cow for his religious ceremonies. King Arjuna sent his soldiers to take the cow. As the conflict developed among the Jamadagni and the King, Arjuna lost his temper and chopped off the head of Jamadagni. When Parashurama (Jamadagni's son and one of the Daśāvatāras of Vishnu) returned to the hermitage, he was informed of the context by his mother. In revenge, Parashurama killed the entire clan of Arjuna and the King with a battleaxe given to him by Shiva, eventually killing all kshatriyas, thus conquering the entire earth. He enacted this wholesale eradication of the kshatriyas for 21 generations.

In another place a different character is given to him, and more in accordance with his behavior at Jamadagni's hut. "He oppressed both men and gods," so that the latter appealed to Vishnu for succor. That God then came down to the earth as Parashurama for the special purpose of killing him.

In the controversy regarding his name the clarification is given as Sahasra.

== The origin of Vrishala Kshatriya ==
The Ocean said, If thou hast heard, O king, of the great Rishi Jamadagni, his son is competent to duly receive thee as a guest.--Then that king proceeded, filled with great wrath. Arrived at that retreat, he found Rama himself. With his kinsmen he began to do many acts that were hostile to Rama, and caused much trouble to that high-souled hero. Then the energy, which was immeasurable of Rama blazed forth, burning the troops of the foe, O lotus-eyed one. Taking up his battle-axe, Rama suddenly put forth his power, and hacked that thousand-armed hero, like a tree of many branches. Beholding him slain and prostrated on the earth, all his kinsmen, uniting together, and taking up their darts, rushed at Rama, who was then seated, from all sides. Rama also, taking up his bow and quickly ascending on his car, shot showers of arrows and chastised the army of the king. Then, some of the Kshatriyas, afflicted with the terror of Jamadagni's son, entered mountain-fastnesses, like deer afflicted by the lion. Of them that were unable, through fear of Rama, to discharge the duties ordained for their order, the progeny became Vrishalas owing to their inability to find Brahmanas. In this way Dravidas and Abhiras and Pundras, together with the Savaras, became Vrishalas through those men who had Kshatriya duties assigned to them (in consequence of their birth), falling away (from those duties). Then the Kshatriyas that were begotten by.

Later on, as Patanjali's Aṣṭādhyāyī mentions, Abhiras appear in 150 BC. Later on, Abhiras established the Traikutaka dynasty with kings such as Ishwarsena, Indradutta, Dahrasena & Vyaghrasena. Dahrasena even performed Ashwamedha Yagya. Traikutikas were known for their Vaishnava faith, who claimed to be Yadava of Haiheya branch. Later on, in 10th century, Chudasamas are mentioned as the Abhira Ranaka, in Hemachandra's reference to Graharipu in Dvyashraya. Merutunga claims in his prose that Abhira Ranaka, Navaghana defeated Jayasimha eleven times, but Jayasimha went himself twelfth time after capturing newly fortified Vardhamanapura (now Wadhwan).

== Deification and worship ==
Kartavirya Arjuna is often seen not only as a powerful king but also as a sacred or semi-divine figure.

Many Purāṇas describe him as a devotee of Dattatreya and give him supernatural traits — most famously the name *Sahasrabāhu* ("thousand-armed"). Some texts even present him as an incarnation of the Sudarshana Chakra, the divine discus of Vishnu, which links him directly to the divine realm.

Local cults and ritual texts treated Kartavirya Arjuna as an object of worship. Scholars report manuscripts and ceremonies dedicated to him, showing how a royal hero could become a focus of devotion in certain regions.

Later rulers (for example some Kalachuri groups) claimed descent from Sahasrarjuna, and that political claim helped turn him into a revered ancestor. In Southeast Asia — notably Javanese wayang tradition — he appears as a larger-than-life, sometimes divine hero. These written, political and popular traditions together explain why Kartavirya Arjuna is sometimes worshipped or remembered as a deity or sacred ancestor.

== Relation with the Kalachuris ==
The Kalachuri dynasty of Tripuri, which ruled parts of central India between the 6th and 13th centuries CE, claimed descent from the legendary king Sahasrarjuna.

The Kalachuris rulers identified themselves as members of the Haihaya family and used titles such as "Haihaya-vamsaja" ("of the Haihaya lineage") in their inscriptions to emphasise this ancestral claim.

Inscriptions from Kalachuri sites such as Tripuri(now tewar), Ratanpur, and Gyaraspur mention the dynasty’s link to the Haihayas, and some genealogies connect them with the lunar dynasty (*Chandravamsa*). This connection to Sahasrarjuna’s legend was probably meant to strengthen their royal legitimacy by linking the rulers to an ancient and heroic ancestor.

Modern historians note that this claim was likely symbolic rather than genealogical. While the Kalachuris adopted the Haihaya–Sahasrarjuna heritage in their royal ideology, there is no concrete historical evidence that directly ties the dynasty’s founders to the ancient Haihaya kings of Mahishmati.

== In Buddhism ==
In Buddhist literature, Kārtavīrya Arjuna appears under the Pali name Ajjuna Sahassabāhu ("Arjuna the Thousand-Armed"), where he is cited primarily as a cautionary example of royal hubris and the fatal consequences of offending virtuous sages.

In the Theravada Jātaka tales, Ajjuna is described as the mighty ruler of the Kekakas who possessed immense physical strength. According to the commentary on the Bhūridatta Jātaka (Jātaka No. 543), his epithet Sahassabāhu is explained figuratively: he was capable of drawing a massive bow that required the combined strength of 500 archers, giving him the strength of a thousand arms. Despite his martial prowess, the Saṅkicca Jātaka (Jātaka No. 530) and the Sarabhaṅga Jātaka (Jātaka No. 522) recount that he and his entire kingdom were destroyed after he wronged and killed a rishi (identified as either Gotama or Aṅgirasa).

In Central Asian Buddhist tradition, the figure of Sahasrabāhu was also merged with King Dasharatha in the Khotanese Ramayana. In this adaptation, Rama's father is named Sahasrabāhu and is slain by Parashurama after seizing a wish-granting cow from a Brahmin, prompting Rama and Lakshmana to later avenge their father's death.

== Outside Indian subcontinent ==
=== Indonesia ===
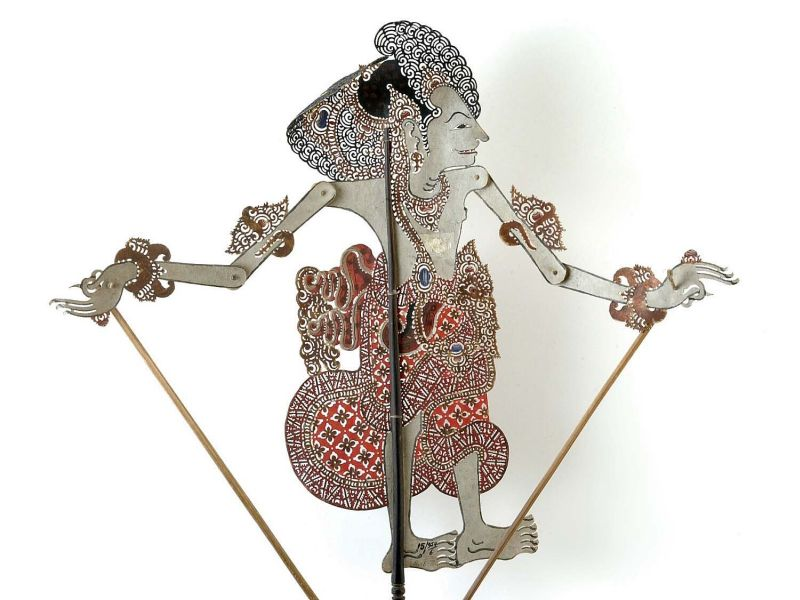
Kartavirya Arjuna wayang (puppetry) figures

In Indonesia version, especially in Javanese wayang, Kartavirya Arjuna (Indonesian: Kartawirya Arjuna ) is called by the name of Prabu Arjuna Sasrabahu. He is told as the son of Kartawirya and still a descendant of Batara Surya. His grandfather, Herriya, was the founder of the Mahespati Kingdom. Herriya has a sister named Resi Wisageni who has two sons named Suwandagni and Jamadagni. Suwandagni had sons named Sumantri and Sukasrana, while Jamadagni had sons named Ramabargawa (Parasurama). Thus, between Arjuna and Parasurama there is still a cousin relationship.

The Javanese version of Arjuna Sasrabahu is considered an avatar of Vishnu. He ruled justly and wisely in the Mahespati Kingdom. His wife named Citrawati daughter of the Kingdom of Magadha. The person who was assigned to propose to the daughter was Sumantri. This success had made Sumantri forget herself. He also challenges Arjuna if he wants to take Citrawati as a wife, he must take it himself. After going through an exciting battle, Sumantri finally admitted defeat. Arjuna was willing to forgive as long as Sumantri could move Sriwedari Park from Mount Untarayana into Mahespati's palace. Sumantri managed to fulfill this request thanks to the help of her younger brother, Sukasrana. Arjuna who was very happy decided to appoint Sumantri as governor with the title Suwanda.

One day Arjuna went on an excursion with his wife in a river. He did triwikrama changing his form into a very large giant and while lying on the dam the flow of the river created a pond as a bathing place for Citrawati. As a result, the river overflowed to flood the camp of Ravana king of Alengka who was on his way to expand the colony. Then there was a battle between the Alengka troops against Mahespati. Because Citrawati is the reincarnation of Widawati, the woman Ravana loves, Hwana is increasingly eager to crush Mahespati's army. After Suwanda died in the battle, Arjuna Sasrabahu woke up from his sleep and immediately attacked Ravana. Arjuna managed to defeat Ravana, then tied him with chains and dragged him using a chariot. Seeing the torture, Batara Narada came down to deliver a message from heaven for Arjuna to release Ravana because the giant king was not destined to die. Arjuna also freed Ravana on the condition that he should stop spit out his anger. Ravana agreed, and from that moment he became a vassal of Arjuna Sasrabahu. With various tricks Ravana tried to eliminate Arjuna to launch his greedy act again and marry Citrawati.

One day when Arjuna was hunting alone in the forest to entertain himself, Ravana came to report to Citrawati that her husband had died in an accident. Despite Ravana's plan, Citrawati actually defended her starch by plunging into the fire. Upon hearing of his wife's death, Arjuna became even more sad. In this situation Batara Vishnu left Arjuna's body to return to heaven. Arjuna who had lost his passion for life, went to abandon his kingdom. On the way he met Ramabargawa alias Parasurama, his cousin. The valiant Brahmin wandered in search of the perfect death. Apparently he had received divine instructions that he could enter heaven if he died at the hands of Vishnu's incarnation through a fight.

Seeing a good opportunity, Ramabargawa also challenged Arjuna Sasrabahu. Arjuna who was no longer passionate about life was finally killed by Ramabargawa's ax. Batara Narada descended from heaven to explain to Ramabargawa that Vishnu had long since left Arjuna's body. Later, Vishnu will reappear as a prince from the Ayodhya Kingdom named Sri Rama. This character will later lead Ramabargawa to his death.

== Sources ==
- Asoke Kumar Majumdar (1956). Chaulukyas of Gujarat. Bharatiya Vidya Bhavan. OCLC 4413150.
- Kisari Mohan Ganguli, The Mahabharata of Krishna-Dwaipayana Vyasa Translated into English Prose, 1883–1896.
