= Turvayana =

Turvayana was a young Paktha king who is referred to in the ancient Hindu Rig Veda text.

== See also ==
- Chyavana
- Battle of the Ten Kings
