= Anupa kingdom =

Kingdom mentioned in the epic Mahabharata

Anupa is a kingdom mentioned in the epic Mahabharata. It lay to the north west of Vidarbha, in what is now Maharashtra . It was founded by the races from the western kingdoms like Madra and Kamboja

== References in Mahabharata ==
=== Anupa mentioned as a kingdom of Ancient India (Bharata Varsha) ===
....the Upavrittas, the Anupa Vrittas, the Surashatras, Kekayas; the Kutas, the Maheyas, the Kakshas, the Samudranishkutas; the Andhras (6,9)

=== Anupa, in the line of Daksha ===
Daksha was a Prajapati (one who have many sons and thus a founder of a race). Pradha was one of his daughters. She was married to the sage Kasyapa, the son of sage Marichi. Anupa was one of her daughters. (1,65)

=== King named Paschimanupaka ===
That best of Asuras who was known as Mritapa became on earth, the monarch, Pascimanupaka.(1,67)

=== Anupa Raja in Yudhishthira's court ===
Ketumata, Vasudana, and Vaideha and Kritakshana: Sudharman, Aniruddha, Srutayu endued with great strength; the invincible Anupa Raja (king of Anupa), the handsome Karmajit; Shishupala with his son, the king of Karusha; and the invincible youths of the Vrishni race, all these kings were present in Yudhishthira's newly built court at his capital Indraprastha. (2,4)

=== Anupas in Kurukshetra War ===
The ruler of the Dasarnas, and the Prayagas, with the Daserakas, and the Anupakas, and the Kiratas were placed in the neck of the military configuration of the name Krauncharuma (of the shape of a bird) of the Pandavas, on day two of Kurukshetra War. (6,50)

== See also ==
- Kingdoms of Ancient India
