= Kutsa =

Heroic figure in the Rigveda

Kutsa is a heroic figure of the Rigveda.

== Rigveda ==
Kutsa appears in the Rigveda as a heroic figure who is associated with Indra's defeat of the demon Śuṣṇa and the winning of the sun. He, along with Atithigva and Āyu, are also known to have been defeated by Indra, an act at one point attributed to Tūrvayāṇa. At other points Kutsa and Atithigva are known to be friends of Indra. According to Hillebrandt, the two views on Kutsa's friendly or adversarial relations with Indra can be resolved by postulating that the Rigveda refers to two separate Kutsas. At one point in the Rigveda, Kutsa stated to have defeated Smadibha, Tugra, and the Vetasus. Kutsa is stated to be a descendant of Arjuna.
