= Rishi Asita =

Vedic Sage

Asita
- असित

Personal life
- Spouse: Ekaparṇā
- Children: Devala
- Parent: Kashyapa (father)
- Era: Vedic Period
- Notable idea: Rebirth (Punarjanm)
- Notable works: Sukta 5 to 24 in 9th Mandala of Rigaveda; Asitakrutam Shivastotram
- Known for: Seer sage in Rigaveda
- Occupation: Philosopher

Religious life
- Religion: Hinduism

Rishi Asita (Sanskrit: ऋषि असित) simply called as Asita (Romanised: Āsita) was a Vedic sage and a pravara in the Shandilya Gotra.

== Description ==
In the Matsya Purana, Asita is mentioned as one of the pravaras of the Shandilya gotra. According to Saurapurāṇa, Asita was born as a result of the penance of a sage named Kashyapa. Devala then was born to Asita and his wife Ekaparṇā. Sometimes, Asita and Devala are jointly mentioned as the son of the Vedic Rishi Kashyapa. The Brahmavaivarta Purāṇa mentions that Asita was given his son by Shiva. Devala's own son, Shandilya, was born similarly.

In the Bhagavad Gita verse 10.12-13, Arjuna described Asita as one of the four great sages Narada, Asita, Devala, and Vyasa.

आहुस् त्वाम् ऋषयः सर्वे देवर्षिर् नारदस् तथा । असितो देवलो व्यासः स्वयं चैव ब्रवीषि मे ॥

— Chapter 10, Verse 13, Bhagavad Gita

He is mentioned as a seer sage of some mantras in the Rigaveda. In the Mahabharata, Asita was present in the Rajasuya Yajna organized by the King Yudhishthira. He was joined by sages such as Bharadvaja, Vishvamitra, Gautama, Parashurama, and Vashishtha, who together chanted the hymns of Samaveda. In the ninth chapter of Bhagavata Purana, Asita met and conversed with a dying Bhishma. He was also an associate of Krishna: Asita served as the priest of the yajna in Kurukshetra that Krishna organized, and further accompanied him when he went to the Mithila Kingdom to meet his devotees King Bahulashva Janaka and the Brahmin Shrutadeva.

According to legend, Asista lived in Yamunotri in Uttarakhand. He is believed to have discovered the Yamuna river. Thus, the Yamuna river is also called the "Asita". The Mahasiddhishwar Mahadev Mandir in Kashi is believed to be where he meditated.

== Ideas ==
Rishi Asita propagated the idea of rebirth. In the 24th chapter of the Vishnu Purana, Prithvi (the earth) explained the secret of ignorance of the kings of the world in the form of verse to Asita. In a parable in the Brahmanda Purana, Asista explains the philosophy of rebirth to King Janaka in Mithila. He does so by communicating this "secret of ignorance of the kings" to King Janaka.

In Mandala 9, also known ninth book of the Rigaveda, Asita is the seer sage of the hymns from the Sukta 5 to the Sukta 24. In the Brahmavaivarta Purana, Asita composed a stotra devoted to Shiva called the Asitakrutam Shivastotram.
