= Aurva =

Sage in Hinduism

- Affiliation: Rishi, Bhargava

Genealogy
- Parents: Chyavana (father), Arushi (mother)
- Children: Richika (son), Kandali (daughter – wife of Durvasa)

Aurva (Sanskrit: और्व, romanized: Aurva, lit. 'produced from the thigh') is a fierce sage in Hinduism, a member of the Bhargava race. He was born during a bloody feud between the Kshatriyas and the descendants of Bhrigu. He was also the grandfather of Vatsa, after whom the Srivatsa gotra is named. His son is Richika, the grandfather of the sixth avatar of Vishnu, Parashurama.

== Legend ==
=== Birth ===
According to the Mahabharata, there was a Haihaya king named Kritavirya who was very liberal to his priests, who belonged to the race of Bhrigu. As such, they became very rich due to his generosity. After the death of the king, his descendants fell into poverty. They begged for help from the Bhrigus, who at that time were very rich; but the Bhrigus refused to help the kings, saying that wealth which is once given to a Brahmin cannot be taken back. To protect their wealth they buried their gold in a secret place. Learning of this, the Kshatriya kings invaded the ashramas of the Bhrigus, and killed all the Bhrigus, not sparing even children that were growing in the wombs of their mothers. Although the Bhrigus were also descended from a warrior class, they could not stop the kings from slaughtering them. One woman, Arushi, concealed her foetus in her thighs to protect her unborn child from being slaughtered. The Kshatriyas, who learned of this, rushed towards the lady to kill the baby. The baby emerged from her left thigh with such a radiance that all the persecutors were blinded instantly. Since the child was produced from the uru (thigh) of a woman he was called Aurva.

=== Penance ===
When he grew up, he intended to destroy the whole universe as a revenge for the slaughter of his family. So, he did austere penances. Seeing that the world was about to come to an end, the Pitrs came down to him. They prayed to him to change his mind. They said that it was their own decision of dying at the hands of the Kshatriyas, for they were bored of their long lives. But they could not resort to suicide, for through suicide, they would reach Naraka and not Svarga, and hence they had hid all their wealth underground to enrage the warriors. After their death, they had attained Svarga. Hearing this, Aurva decided to not destroy the universe. As suggested, he threw the fire of his penance into the ocean, which consumed water in the form of a horse's mouth, named Vadavamukha, giving rise to the Vadavagni, the submarine fire.

=== Refuge ===
An Ikshvaku king named Subahu, and his queen, Yadavi, sought refuge in the hermitage of Aurva after fleeing Ayodhya, after it was captured by the Haihayas. After Subahu died, his wife decided to self-immolate on his funeral pyre according to tradition, but Aurva halted her, informing her that she was pregnant. After a few months, a son was born to her, who Aurva named Sagara, literally, 'the poisoned one', because Yadavi had been poisoned when she was with child.
