= Gotra =

Lineage forming an exogamous clan in Vedic society

In Hindu culture, the term gotra (Sanskrit: गोत्र) is considered to be equivalent to lineage. It broadly refers to people who are descendants in an unbroken male line from a common male ancestor or patriline. Generally, the gotra forms an exogamous unit, with marriage within the same gotra being regarded as incest and prohibited by custom. The name of the gotra can be used as a surname, but it is different from a surname and is strictly maintained because of its importance in marriages among Hindus, especially among castes. Pāṇini defines gotra as apatyam pautraprabhrti gotram (IV. 1. 162), which means "the word gotra denotes the descendance (or descendants), apatya, of a couple consisting of a pautra, a son and a bharti, a mother, i.e. a daughter-in-law." (Based on Monier Williams Dictionary definitions.)

== Foundational structure ==
According to the Brihadaranyaka Upanishad 2.2.4, Kashyapa, Atri, Vasistha, Vishvamitra, Gautama Maharishi, Jamadagni and Bharadvaja are seven sages (also known as saptarishi) and Jambu Maharishi is another sage (also known as Renuka, who belongs to Kashyapa). The progeny of these eight sages are declared to be gotras. This enumeration of seven primary and one secondary gotra seems to have been known to Pāṇini. The offspring (apatya) of these seven are gotras and others than these are called gotrāvayava.

One who follows the system defined by three sages defines himself as Tri-a-Vishay. Similarly, for five sages, it is Pancha-Vishay, and for seven sages, it is Santa-Vishay.

There exists another theory about gotra: sons and disciples of a sage would have the same gotra; it is believed that they possess similar thoughts and philosophies. People of the same gotra can be found across different castes. Each gotra comprises pravaras.

While Hindu texts prescribe marrying within one's own community, they prohibit individuals from marrying those who belong to their own gotra, or lineage from the same Vedic sage:

One should not choose (the bride) from the same gotra or born in the line of same sage. (One may choose) from (descendants of) more than seven (generations) on the paternal side and more than five (generations) on the maternal side.

— Agni Purana, Chapter 154

== Origins ==
As a Rigvedic term, gotra simply means "forward moving descendants". (गौः) गमन करनेवाली (पृथिवी) means one always moving (Earth) and (त्र:) stands for Offspring. The specific meaning "family, lineage kin" (as it were "herd within an enclosure") is relatively more recent, first recorded around the mid-1st millennium BCE (e.g., Chandogya Upanishad).

These "lineages" as they developed among the Brahmins of that time meant patrilineal descent. The Brahmanic system was later adopted by other communities, such as the Kshatriyas and Vaishyas

According to the Vedic theories, the Brahmins are direct descendants of seven sages who are believed to be the sons of Brahma, born out of his mind through yogic prowess. They are (1) Atri, (2) Bharadvaja, (3) Gautama Maharishi, (4) Jamadagni, (5) Kashyapa, (6) Vasishta and (7) Vishvamitra. To this list, Agastya is also sometimes added. These eight sages are called gotrakarins, from whom all 108 gotras (especially of the Brahmins) have evolved. For instance, from Atri sprang the Atreya and Gavisthiras gotras.

According to Robert Vane Russell, many gotras of Hindu religion are of totemic origin which is named after plants, animals, and natural objects. These are universal among tribes but occur also in Hindu castes. The commonest totem names are those of animals, including several which are held sacred by Hindus, as bagh or Nahar, the tiger; bachhas, the calf; murkuria, the peacock; kachhua, the tortoise; nagas, the cobra; hathi, the elephant; bhains, the buffalo; richaria, the bear; Kuliha, the Jackal, Kukura, the dog; kursaal, the deer; Hiran, the Blackbuck and so on. The utmost variety of names is found, and numerous trees, as well as rice and other crops, salt, sandalwood, cucumber, pepper, and some household implements such as pestle, rolling slab, serve as the names of clans. Thus the name of the rishi Bharadvaja means a lark bird, and Kaushika means descended from Kusha grass, Agastya from Agassi flower, Kashyapa from kachhap a tortoise, Taittiri from titer, the partridge. Similarly, the origin of other rishis is attributed to animals, Rishyasringa to an antelope, Mandavya to a frog, Kanada to an owl. The usual characteristic of totemism is that the members of a clan regard themselves as related to or descended from, the animals or trees from which the clan takes its name, and abstain from killing or eating them.

A gotra must be distinguished from a kula. A kula is equal to a particular family, or equal to modern-day "clans". A kula relates to a caste.

== Marriages and gotras ==
Marriages within the gotra (sagotra marriages) are not permitted under the rule of exogamy in the traditional matrimonial system. The compound word sagotra is a union of the words "sa" and "gotra", where "sa" means same or similar. It is common practice in preparation for Hindu marriage to inquire about the kula-gotra (clan lineage) of the bride and groom before approving the marriage. People within the gotra are considered as siblings and marrying such a person can lead to higher chances for the child to get genetically transferred diseases. In almost all Hindu families, marriage within the same gotra is not practiced (since they are believed to be descended from the same lineage). Marriages between different gotras are encouraged; marriage within the same gotra started to happen later.

For example, Jats, Gurjars, and Rajputs have 13,000 Gotras. And Mudirajas of Andhra Pradesh and Tamil Nadu have 2,600 Gotras. Gotra is always passed on from father to children among most Hindu communities. However, among the Tulu people it is passed on from mother to child.

The tatsama words sahodara (brother) and sahodari (sister) derive their roots from the Sanskrit word sahara (सहर) meaning co-uterine or born of the same womb. In communities where gotra membership passed from father to children, marriages were allowed between a woman and her maternal uncle, while such marriages were forbidden in matrilineal communities, like Tuluvas, where gotra membership was passed down from the mother.

A much more common characteristic of South Indian Hindu society is permission for marriage between cross-cousins (children of brother and sister, first cousins) as they are of different gotras. Thus, a man is allowed to marry his maternal uncle's daughter or his paternal aunt's daughter but is not allowed to marry his paternal uncle's daughter. She would be considered a parallel cousin, of the same gotra, and therefore to be treated as a sister.

Nepali Hindu society not only follows the rules of gotra for marriages but also has many regulations which go beyond the basic definition of gotra and have a broader definition of incest. Some communities in North India do not allow marriage with certain other clans, based on the belief that both clans are of the same patrilineal descent. In other communities, marriage within the gotra of the mother's father, and possibly some others, is prohibited.

A possible workaround for Sagotra marriages is to perform a Data (adoption) of the bride to a family of different gotra (usually data is given to the bride's maternal uncle who belongs to different gotra by the same rule) and let them perform the 'Kanyadanam' ('kanya' (girl) + 'danam' (to give)). Such workarounds are used in rare cases, and the acceptability is questionable.

Vedic Hinduism recognizes eight types of marriages, thus predominantly following the principles as stated in the Manu Smriti, referring to eight types of marriages, the roles, and responsibilities of husband and wife, and the purpose of marriage. Eight types of marriages are, (1) Brahma Vivaha, (2) Arsa Vivaha, (3) Daiva Vivaha, (4) Prajapatya Vivaha, (5) Gandharva Vivaha, (6) Asura Vivaha, (7) Rakshasa Vivaha, and (8) Paishacha Vivaha. The first four types of marriages reflect the paradigm behind arranged marriages. The last three are prohibited as per Manu Smriti, out of which the last two are condemned. The Gandharva marriage is analogous to the modern-day love marriage, where the individuals have the liberty to choose their partners. Though Gandharva marriage had its due prominence in the Shastras or precepts, with the advancement of time, Vedic Hinduism giving way to classic Hinduism, the concept of arranged marriage rose to prominence, which still today is predominant ritual for a marriage between two individuals.

There is no harm in Sagotra marriage if the individuals are not related for six generations on both maternal and paternal sides. This is expressed in chapter 5 of Manu smriti in mantra 60, which states, सपिण्डता तु पुरुषे सप्तमे विनिवर्तते । समानोदकभावस्तु जन्मनाम्नोरवेदने, which means that sapinda ends after seven generations. Section 5(v) of Hindu Marriage Act 1955 also prohibits Sapinda relationship but there is no restriction of Sagotra marriage.

=== Legal situation ===
While the gotras are almost universally used for excluding marriages that would be traditionally incestuous, they are not legally recognized as such, although those within "degrees of prohibited relationship" or who are "sapinda" are not permitted to marry. Khap panchayats in Haryana have campaigned to legally ban marriages within the same gotra. A convener of the Kadyan Khap, Naresh Kadyan, petitioned the courts to seek an amendment to the Hindu Marriage Act to legally prohibit such marriages. However, the petition was dismissed as withdrawn after being vacated, with the Delhi High Court warning that the Khap would face heavy penalty costs for wasting the time of the court.

In the 1945 case of Madhavrao vs Raghavendrarao, which involved a Deshastha Brahmin couple, the definition of gotra as descending from eight sages and then branching out to several families was thrown out by the Bombay High Court. The court called the idea of Brahmin families descending from an unbroken line of common ancestors as indicated by the names of their respective gotras "impossible to accept." The court consulted relevant Hindu texts and stressed the need for Hindu society and law to keep up with the times, emphasizing that notions of good social behavior and the general ideology of Hindu society had changed. The court also said that the material in the Hindu texts is so vast and full of contradictions that it is a near-impossible task to reduce it to order and coherence.

== See also ==
- Aliyasantana
- Hindu genealogy registers at Haridwar
- Pravaras
- Bharadvaja
- List of gotras
