= Mandhatri =

King in Hindu literature

Mandhatṛi
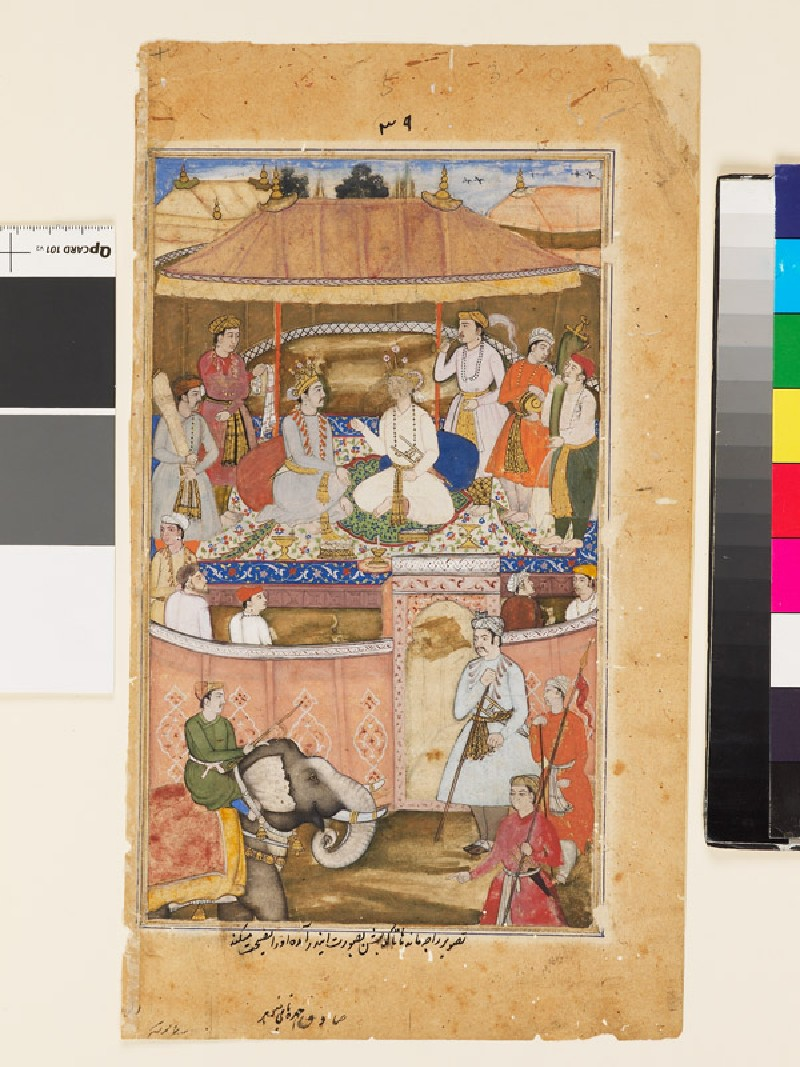
- Krishna counsels Mandhatri in the guise of Indra.
- Texts: Mahabharata

Genealogy
- Parents: Yuvanashva (father)
- Spouse: Bindumati
- Children: Purukutsa, Ambarisha, and Muchukunda
- Dynasty: Suryavamsha

Mandhatṛi or Mandhata (Sanskrit: मान्धाता, Māndhātṛ) was a legendary prehistoric king of the Suryavamsha or Solar dynasty of India. He was said to have conquered the entire world and composed Hymn 134 of Mandala 10 in the Rig Veda. The Mahabharata calls him the son of Yuvanashva. He marries Bindumati, the daughter of King Shashabindu of the Yadu dynasty. According to the Puranas, he had three sons: Purukutsa, Ambarisha, and Muchukunda. He is remembered for his greatness, benevolence, and generosity.

== Birth ==
Mandhatṛ's legend is cited in the Vana Parva and the Shanti Parva of the Mahabharata.

King Yuvanashva of Ayodhya once went on a hunting expedition, and in the afternoon, he became wracked with thirst. He came across the site of a yajna, and drank the sacred sacrificial butter that he observed, upon which he conceived. The Ashvin twins extracted the child from the king's womb. Even as the deities wondered how they would sustain the child, Indra produced some nectar from his fingers, which the child consumed. Drawing his strength from the hand of Indra, Mandhatṛ grew immensely powerful.

== Conquests ==
By mere willpower, he conquered the entire earth in one day. He proceeded to vanquish the kings Marutta of Ushiraviga, Asita, the Druhyu king Angara, Nriga, Brihadratha of Anga, Suna, Jaya, Janamejaya, Sudhanvan, Gaya of Kanyakubja, Angara's son Gandhara, and several others in battle. Mandhatṛ conquered Patala, Bhuloka, and half of Svarga, and became the ruler of the three worlds.

The Mahabharata states that Mandhatṛ, the King of Ayodhya, gave away colossal statues of Rohita fish, entirely made up of pure gold and spanning several kilometres to the Brahmanas as a charity. He also gave away 10,000 padmas (10 quintillion) of cows of the best breed to the Brahmanas during his sacrifices. Mandhatṛ performed a hundred ashvamedha yajnas and a hundred rajasuya yajnas.

Mandhatṛ was also known as Yauvanashvin (son of Yuvanashwa) and Trasadasyu (one who was feared by the wicked). He once fought Ravana, the King of Lanka in a duel, but it ended in a stalemate.

Mandhatṛ married the Chandravamsha princess, Bindumati, daughter of Shashabindu, King of the Yadavas. The couple had three sons and fifty daughters. His sons Purukutsa, Ambarisha, and Muchukunda were equally illustrious. Mandhatṛ's daughters fell in love with the handsome ascetic Saubhari and married him from this Saubhari Brahmins originated. Mandhatṛ's eldest son, Susandhi, succeeded him.

== Death ==
As Mandhatṛ grew old, his hubris grew, and he desired to entirely conquer Svarga, the heavenly regions ruled by Indra. Indra was perturbed by this and told Mandhatṛ that he had not completely conquered the earth. Indra told Mandhatṛ that the asura Lavana, the son of Madhu, tulena the sister of Ravana, the king of Lanka were not a subject to his rule. Mandhatṛ invaded Madhupuri, the city of Lavanasura. Lavana possessed a divine trident given to his father King Madhu by Shiva. As long as he had the trident, nobody could vanquish Lavana in battle. Lavana wielded the trident and burnt Mandhatṛ and his forces, reducing them to ashes in an instant. Lavana was later slain by Shatrughna, a descendant of Mandhatṛ.

== In Buddhism ==
The Chakravartin and his seven possessions

In Buddhist literature, Mandhatri appears under the Pali name Mandhātā (also Mandhātu) and the Sanskrit form Māndhātṛ (or Mūrdhāta), where he is revered as a primeval universal monarch (cakkavatti), an ancestor of the Śākyan clan, and a previous incarnation of the Bodhisatta (the future Gautama Buddha). In Buddhist royal genealogies, such as those preserved in the Mahāvastu and Pāli commentaries, he is placed in the primordial lineage descended from Mahāsammata (the first king of humanity) through King Uposatha.

King Mandhata enjoying the pleasures of heaven

In the Theravāda Jātaka collection, he is the protagonist of the Mandhātu Jātaka (Jātaka No. 258), which uses his reign as a cautionary parable on the insatiability of human craving (taṇhā). Possessing the seven treasures of a cakkavatti and the miraculous power to cause a knee-deep rain of the seven precious jewels simply by clenching his left hand and touching it with his right, Mandhātā rules the entire earth for immense aeons before ascending in his physical body to the heavens. After ruling the heaven of the Four Heavenly Kings, he ascends to Tāvatiṃsa, where Sakka yields half of the celestial throne to him. Mandhātā reigns alongside thirty-six successive Sakkas until greed drives him to plot Sakka's murder to seize sole sovereignty; the moment this thought arises, his merit is exhausted, and he plummets back to earth to die in a royal park, giving a final speech on the futility of desire. In the Milindapañha, he is additionally cited as one of only four mortals in legend to enter the realm of the gods in their earthly bodies.

In northern Sanskrit Buddhist literature, his legend is elaborated in the Māndhātā-avadāna of the Divyāvadāna (and parallel Mūlasarvāstivāda Vinaya texts), which preserves the Purāṇic motif of his miraculous birth from the crown (mūrdhan) of his father King Upoṣadha's head. In this version, before ascending to heaven, Māndhātṛ expels a group of five hundred irritable rishis from his kingdom after one of them curses a flock of cranes for disturbing his meditation. The Māndhātā-avadāna was a popular subject in early Buddhist narrative sculpture, notably depicted in extensive bas-relief panels at Borobudur in Java and Amaravati in India.

== Legacy ==
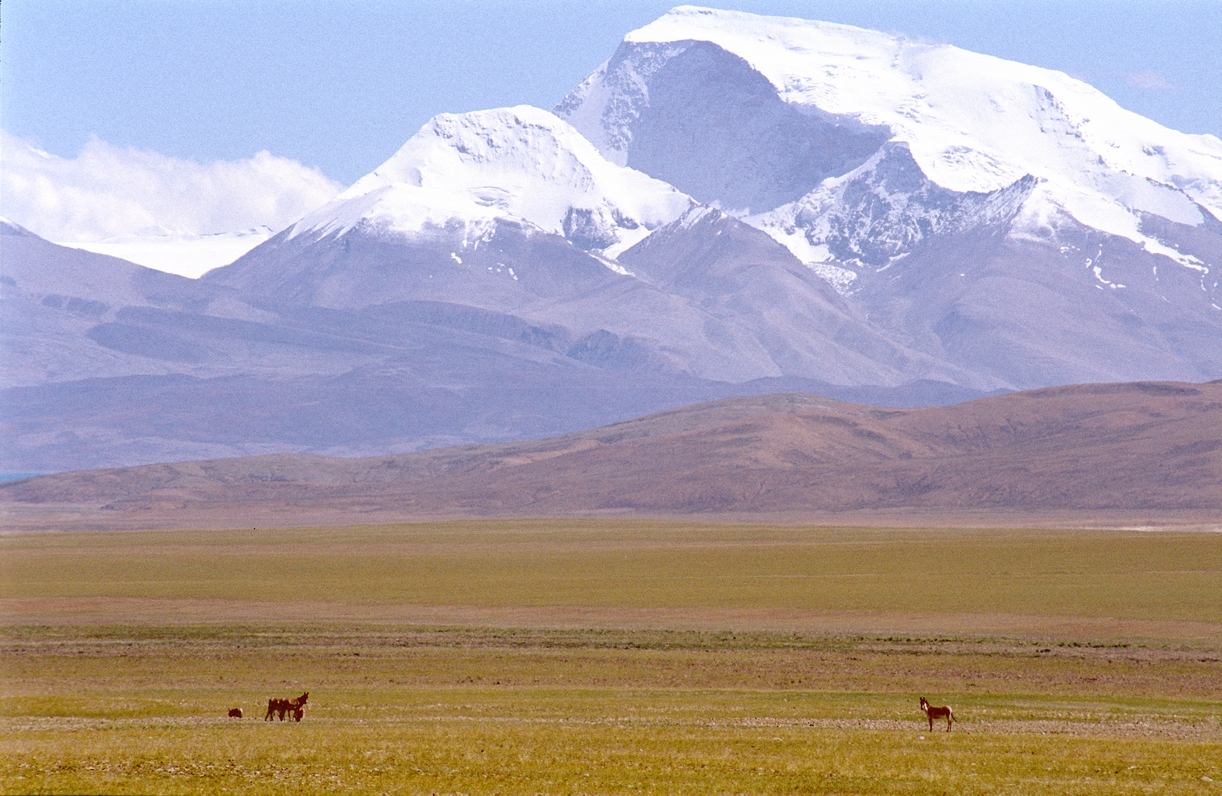
The ultra-high Gurla Mandhata in Tibet

Mandhatṛ is the supposed namesake of Gurla Mandhata, one of the major Himalayan peaks. He supposedly visited the area on his way to the sacred lake Manasarovar beside the axis mundi Mount Kailash.
