= Ambarisha =

King in Hindu texts

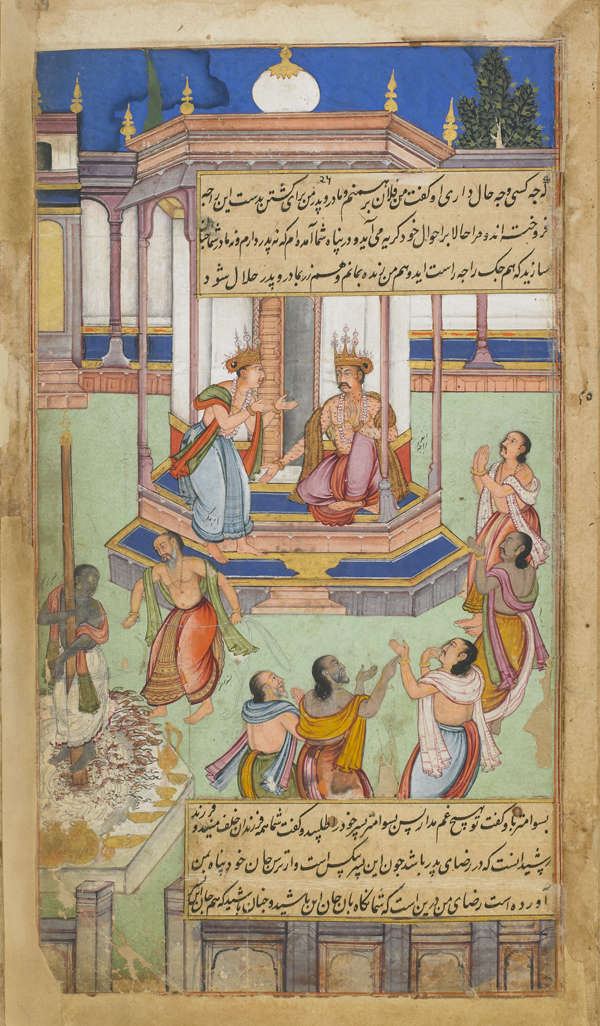
- King Ambarisha offers the youth Sunahshepa in sacrifice

In-universe information
- Family: Mandhatri (father); Yuvanasva (son); Harita (grandson)

In Hindu texts, Ambarisha (Sanskrit: अम्बरीषः, Ambarīṣa) is a Ikshvaku king, this is Suryavamsha (solar dynasty) in which Rama also appeared. Ambarisha was the son of Mandhata of Mathura. He is known to have conquered the whole world in a week. He lived during the Treta Yuga, the second of the four cyclic period. Ambarish is famous for engaging all of his senses in the service of the Vishnu with Bhakti (loving devotion) according to the Bhagavata Purana.

== Legend ==
=== Ramayana ===
The Ramayana contains a variation of an Aitareya Brahmana legend about the king Harishchandra. In the Ramayana version, the king is named Ambarisha, instead of Harishchandra. According to this legend, Ambarisha was once engaged in a Ashvamedha Yagna at his capital Ayodhya. During this ceremony, the horse of Ashvamedha was stolen by Indra. The priest conducting the ceremony told the king that he needed to find the animal, or perform a human sacrifice to avert the misfortune resulting from the situation. After being unable to find the animal, the king bought Shunahshepa, the son of a sage, for the sacrifice. Shunahshepa survived the sacrifice by reciting two hymns that the sage Vishwamitra had given him.

=== Bhagavata Purana ===
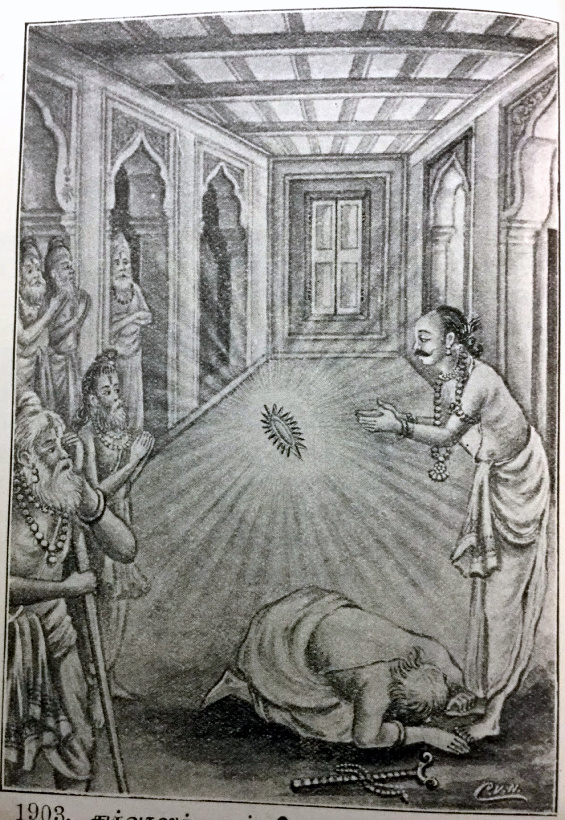
Durvasa falls at the feet of Ambarish and asks for pardon

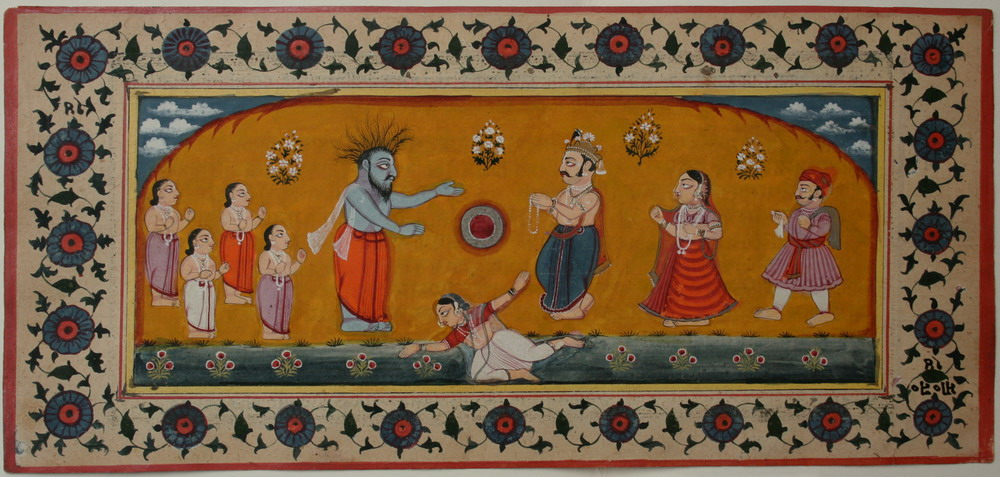
Durvasa (blue-complexioned) with king Ambarisha as the central figures; the chakra in the middle.

According to the Bhagavata Purana, the king was a great devotee of Vishnu, and adhered firmly to the truth. Being pleased with his devotion, Vishnu had given his Sudarshana Chakra to Ambarisha, who worshiped the deity's weapon with great devotion. Once, during Vaikuntha Ekadashi, Ambarisha performed the Dvadashi Vrata at Vrindavana, which required that the king must start a fast on Ekadashi, and break it at the start of Dvadasi (the twelfth day), and feed all his people. As the moment of breaking the fast was drawing near, the mighty sage Durvasa arrived, and was received with all honours by Ambarisha. Durvasa agreed to the king's request to be his honoured guest, and asked the king to wait until he finished his bath in the Yamuna river and returned. As the auspicious moment approached when the king had to break his fast to fulfill the vow of the vrata, Durvasa did not turn up. On the advice of his priests, the king broke his fast by taking a little water, and waited for the arrival of sage Durvasa to offer him food. Durvasa, who was well known for his short temper, felt that Ambarisha had violated the respect due to a guest by breaking his fast before the guest had taken his meal, and in his rage created an asura to kill Ambarisha, out of a strand of his hair. Because Ambarisha was a great devotee, the Sudarshana Chakra intervened, destroyed the asura, and started chasing Durvasa himself. Durvasa went to Brahma and Shiva for protection. Both pleaded their inability to save him. He went to Vishnu himself, who said that he could do nothing as he was bound by the faultless devotion of Ambarisha, and suggested to the sage to seek the pardon of the king. Durvasa went to Ambarisha, who prayed to Vishnu to recall his discus, and save Durvasa. Thus, Durvasa's life was spared.
