= List of Puru and Yadu dynasties =

Legendary dynasties in Hinduism

In Hindu texts, the Puru and Yadu Dynasties are the descendants of legendary King Pururavas who was a famous Hindu ruler in the Treta Yuga. Pururavas was the son of Ila and Budha. Some of the dynasties' important members were Yayati, Yadu, King Puru, Turvasu, Druhyu and Anu. According to Hindu mythology, Yayāti was one of the ancestors of Pandavas and the Yadavas.

== Chandravamsha clan ==
King Pururavas was a ruler of Treta Yuga. According to the Ramayana and the Mahabharata, Pururavas was the son of Ila and Budha. Some important members were Yayati, Yadu, Puru, Turvasu, Druhyu, and Anu. According to the Mahabharata, the Pandavas and the Kauravas were from the lineage of Puru. Kartavirya Arjuna, Krishna and Balarama were from the lineage of Yadu. Turvasu's descendants are named to be the Mlecchas of Balochistan and Dravidas of South India. Druhyu's descendants included the Gandharas and Shakuni. Anu's descendants included ehy Madras, Kekayas, Ushinara, and Shibi.

1. Brahma
2. Atri
3. Chandra
4. Budha

=== The Lunar Dynasty descendants ===
The Lunar Dynasty started in the Treta Yuga.

1. Pururavas
2. Ayu, Shrutayu, Satyayu, Raya, Jaya and Vijaya were the sons of Pururavas
3. Nahusha, Kshatravrdhdha, Raji, Rabha and Anena were the sons of Ayu
4. Yati, Yayati, Samyati, Ayati, Viyati, Nishanta, and Kriti were the sons of Nahusha

Yayati had two wives and five sons. Yadu, Turvasu, Druhyu, Anu, and Puru were the five sons of Yayati. Devayani and Sharmishtha were the two wives of Yayati.

=== Genealogy ===
Brahma
Atri | Anasuya; Wife of Atri
Kandali; Wife of Durvasa | Durvasa | Tara illegitimate Wife of Chandra | Chandra | Rohini; Wife of Chandra | Dattatreya | Anagha; Wife of Dattatreya
Budha illegitimate son of Chandra | Varchas legitimate son of Chandra

== Emperor Puru dynasty ==
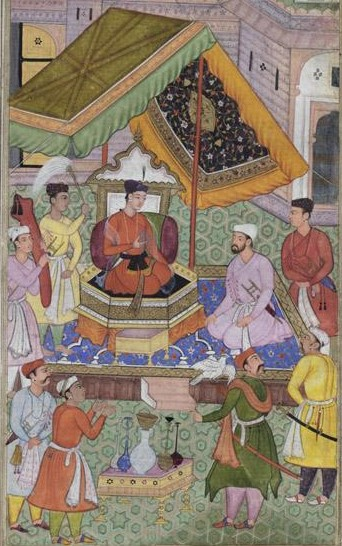
Puru enthroned by Emperor Yayati, made by Bhawani from Razmnama

1. Puru (contemporary to Suryavanshi Emperor Mandhatri)
2. Janamejaya I
3. Prachinwan (contemporary to Suryavanshi king Mulaka)
4. Pravira
5. Manasyu
6. Risheyu
7. Matinara I
8. Charupada
9. Suduyu
10. Bahugava
11. Sanyati
12. Ahamyati
13. Sarvabhauma I
14. Jayatsena
15. Arachina
16. Arihana I
17. Mahabhauma
18. Ayutanayin
19. Akrodhana I
20. Devaththi I
21. Arihana II
22. Riksha II
23. Matinara II
24. Rantinava
25. Tansu
26. Illina
27. Dushyanta
28. Emperor Bharata

=== Emperor Bharata dynasty ===
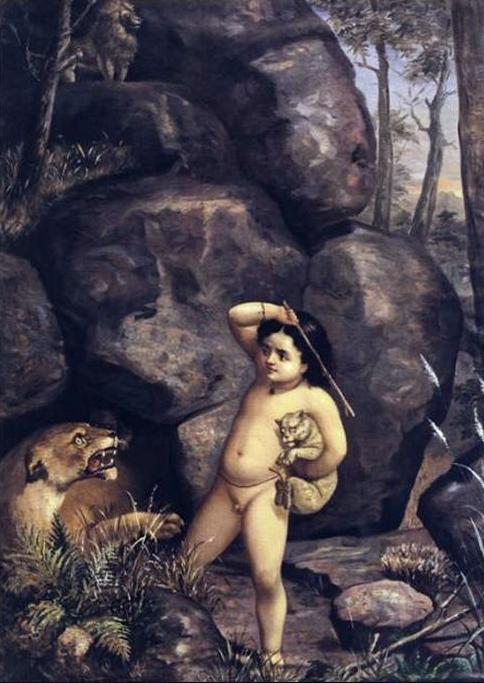
Bharata (Sarvadamana), the son of Dushyanta and Shakuntala. Painting by Raja Ravi Varma.

Bharata (Mahabharata) conquered the whole world from Kashmir (pole) to Kumari (coast) and established the great Lunar dynasty and by the glory, zenith and name of this king, India was called as Bharatavarsha or Bharatakhanda or Bharatadesha or Bharata. He was named so because he had the blessings of Goddess Saraswati and Lord Hayagriva. India developed Vedic studies in the Vedic Period.

1. Bhumanyu
2. Suhotra
3. Ajamida I
4. Riksha II
5. Samvarana I
6. Kuru I
7. Anasawan I
8. Parikshit I
9. Janamejaya II
10. Dhritarashtra I
11. Brihadkshatra
12. Hasthi (founder of Hastinapur)
13. Vikuntana
14. Ajamida II
15. Rishin (became a Rajarshi)
16. Samvarna II
17. Kuru II (By the name and glory of this king, the dynasty was called Kuru Kingdom and was the founder of Magadha Kingdom.)

==== Ajamida dynasty ====
Once in Treta Yuga, there lived a sage called Chuli. He was named so because he worships the lord Shiva always with a Shulam (Trident). Apsara Somada who was the daughter of Apsaras Urmila came to him. Then Sage asked what she wanted. Somada asked him to marry her and to give a brave and a valiant son. Soon they were married and in short time a son was born to them. He was Brahmadatta I who married 100 daughters of Kushanabha who was the grandfather of Sage Vishwamitra and this king formed his kingdom's capital named Kampilya long before the 5 Panchala brothers. But his dynasty's reign were very short.

After his descendants' reign, it came under the control of the Paurava, Ajamida II, who was a descendant of Puru.

==== Panchala dynasty ====
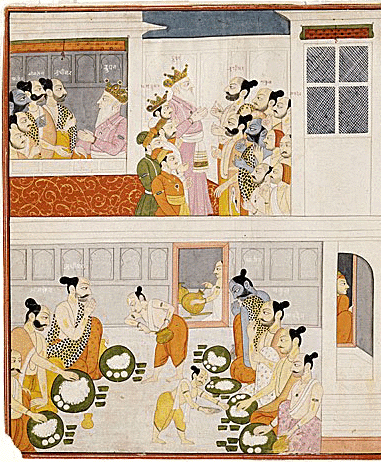
The Pandavas in Drupada's court

Ajamida II had a son named Rishin (a saintly king). Rishin had 2 sons namely Samvarana II whose son was Kuru and Brihadvasu whose descendants were Panchalas.

1. Rishin
2. Samvarana II and Brihadvasu
3. Brihadbhanu was the son of Brihadvasu.
4. Brihatkaya
5. Puranjaya
6. Riksha
7. Bramhyaswa
8. Aramyaswa (Contemporary of Nala, Damayanti, and Rituparna)
9. Mudgala (Rajrshi who married Nala and Damayanti's daughter)
10. Yavinara
11. Pratiswa, Kampilya (Founder of Kampilya - Capital of Panchala Kingdom) and Srnjaya were the sons of Aramyaswa and were the founders of Panchala Kingdom and were called as Panchalas.
12. Dritimana was the son of Mudgala
13. Drdhanemi
14. Sarvasena was the founder of Ujjain Kingdom
15. Mitra
16. Rukmaratha
17. Suparswa
18. Sumathi
19. Sannatimana
20. Krta
21. Pijavana
22. Somadutta
23. Jantuvahana
24. Badhrayaswa
25. Brihadhishu
26. Brihadhanu
27. Brihadkarma (Possibly Pravahana Jaivali)
28. Jayaratha (Possible Contemporary of Suryavanshi Emperor Ramachandra)
29. Visvajit
30. Seinyajit
31. Nepavirya (after this King's name the country was named Nepal)
32. Samara
33. Sadashva
34. Ruchiraswa
35. Pruthusena
36. Prapti
37. Prthaswa
38. Sukrthi
39. Vibhiraja
40. Anuha
41. Bramhadatta II was a Saintly King (Rajarishi)
42. Vishwaksena was a Devotee of Lord Vishnu
43. Dandasena
44. Durmukha
45. Durbuddhi
46. Dharbhya
47. Divodasa
48. Sivana I
49. Mitrayu
50. Maitrayana
51. Soma
52. Sivana II
53. Sadasana
54. Sahadeva
55. Somaka
56. Sugandakrthu and Prihasta ( Somaka had 100 sons; whom the eldest was Sugandakrthu and youngest was Prishata. However, in a war the 99 elder sons died and Prishata Survived and became the king of Panchala)
57. Drupada (son of Prishata and rival of Drona)
58. Dhrishtadyumna, Draupadi and Shikhandi (Who played major roles in the Mahabharata)

==== Kuru dynasty ====
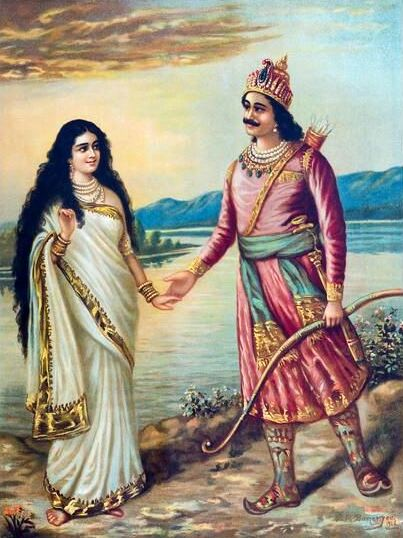
King Shantanu and Ganga

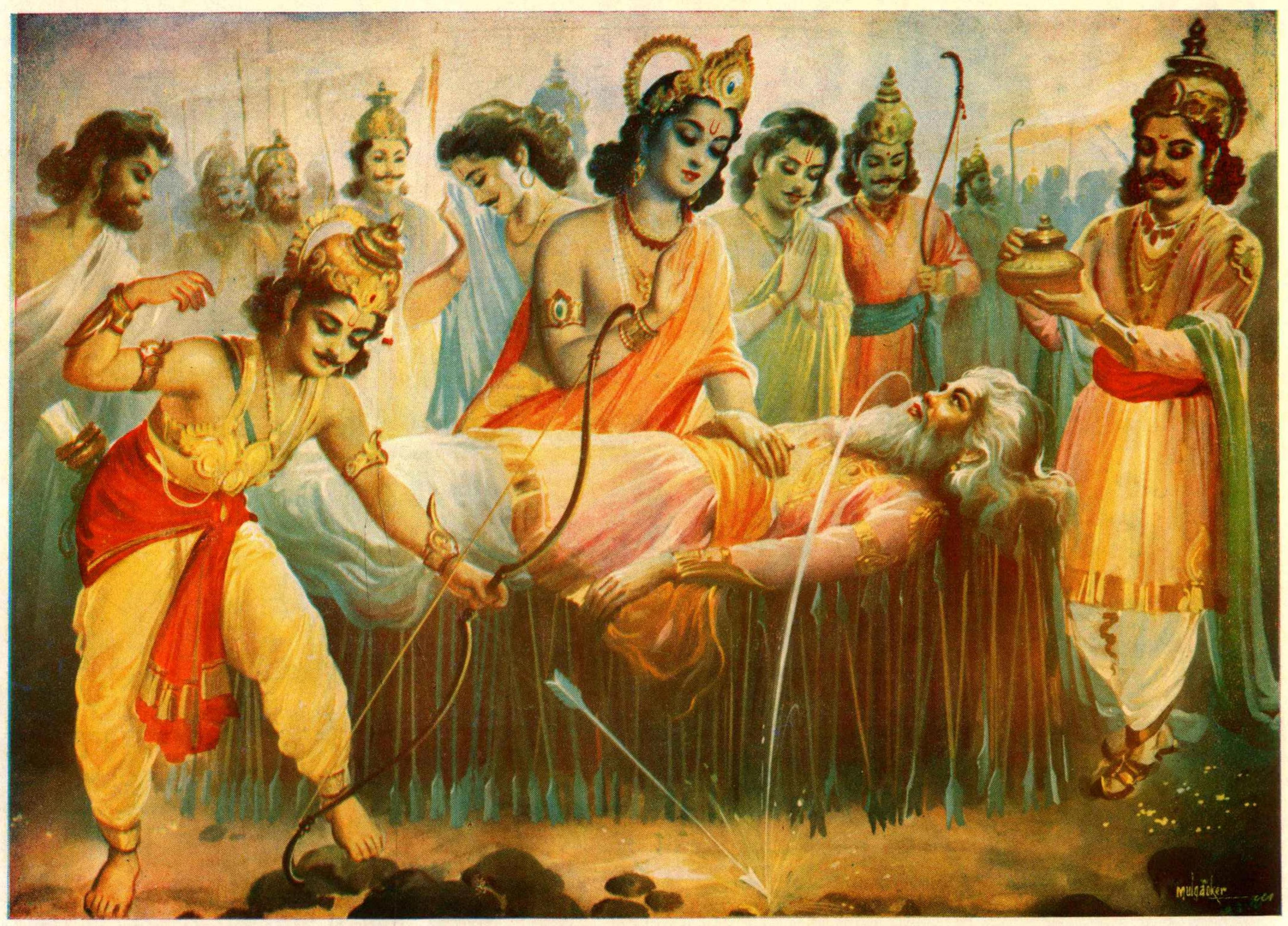
The end of the Kurukshetra War, and the final moments of Bhishma, surrounded by the victorious Pandavas and Sri Krishna.

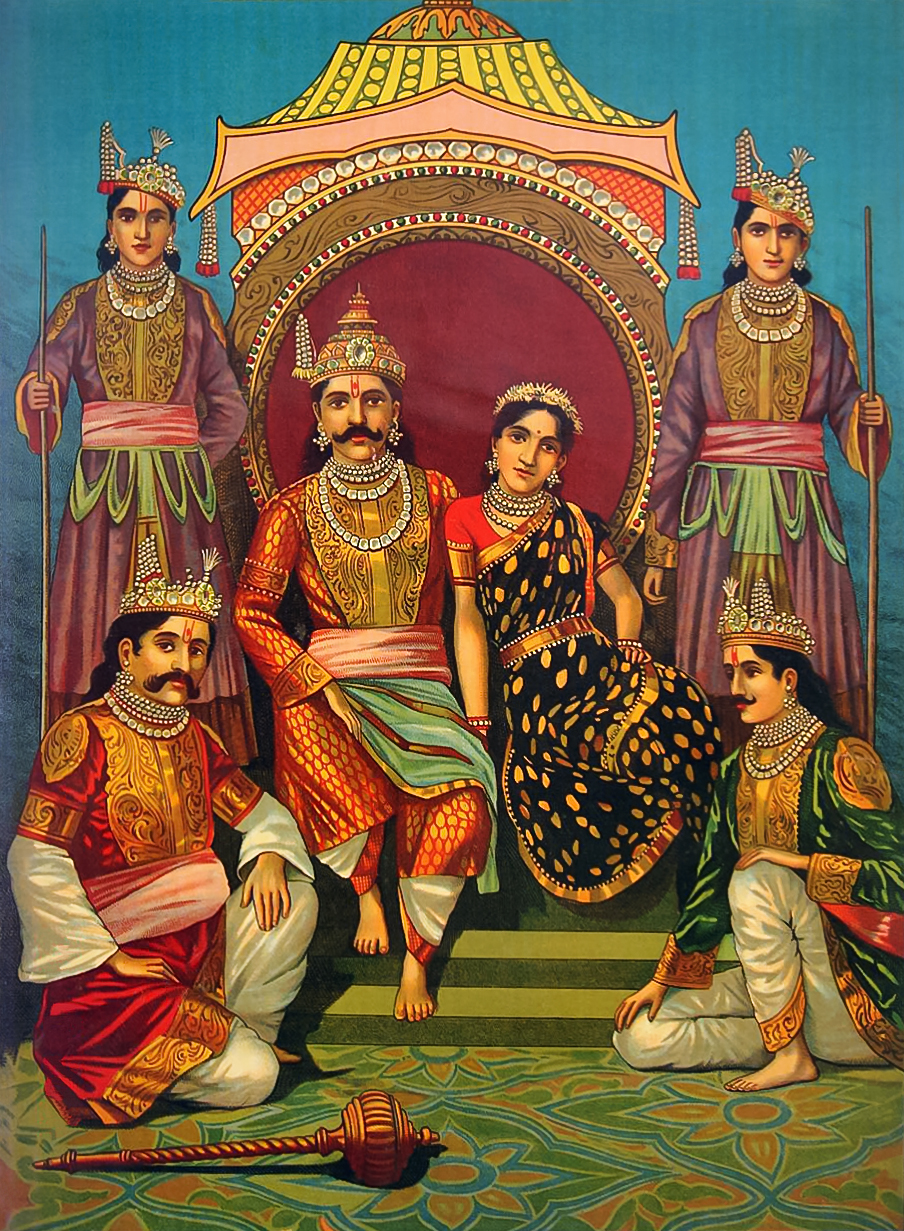
Emperor Yudhishitra, with his Pandava brothers and their common wife Draupadi.

Kuru II, a king of Puru dynasty after whom the dynasty was named 'Kuruvansha' or 'Kaurava'. After his name, the district in Haryana was called as Kurukshetra. This battlefield before the birth of Bhishma, Shantanu and Pratipa was the Yagnabhumi (sacred place or sacrificial place or capital city of Kuru Kingdom) of this King in Dvapara Yuga. By the glory, zenith and name of this king the dynasty was hence the Kuru Dynasty and the kingdom was renamed from Paurava Kingdom to Kuru Kingdom. After these Kings several kings of this dynasty established several kingdoms. He had three sons, namely Vidhuratha I who became the ruler of Pratisthana, Vyushitaswa who died at a very young age, and Sudhanva, who became the ruler of Magadha. Henceforth, Vidhuratha became the king of Hastinapura.

{{Div col|colwidth=70em|content=#Vidhuratha I

1. Jahnu
2. Suratha
3. Vidhuratha II
4. Sarvabhauma II
5. Jayasena
6. Radhika
7. Ayutayu
8. Akrodhana II
9. Devaththi II
10. Riksha III
11. Dilipa
12. Anaswan II
13. Parikshit II
14. Janamejaya III
15. Bheemasena
16. Pratishravas
17. Pratipa
18. Shantanu
19. Chitrāngada (Son of Shantanu, who was killed prematurely). Devavrata Bhishma was the eldest son of Shantanu. Vichitravirya was the son of Shantanu and legal father of Pandu, Dhritarashtra II and Vidura.

Note: Krishna Dvaipayana (Ved Vyas) is technically a maharishi who was the real biological father of Pandu, Vidura, Dhritarashtra II. Many people think that the Kuru dynasty ended as Vichitravirya didn't have any real kids but fortunately Ved Vyas's mother was Satyavati (wife of Shantanu) and Satyavati's biological father was Uparichara Vasu (Kuru King belonging to the Kurus of Magadha branch)

1. Pandu ( Son of Vichitravirya and Ambalika). Vidura, who was his half brother, served as his, and his elder brother's Prime Minister.
2. Dhritarashtra II (Older half-brother of Pandu, and son of Ambika who didn't succeed Vichitravirya directly due to his blindness).
3. The Kauravas, led by Duryodhana (Sons of Dhritarashtra and Gandhari, who were slain in the Kurukshetra War). They
4. The Pandavas, led by Chakravarti Samrat Yudhishtira (Who were the main protagonists of the Mahabharata).

Yaudheya was the son of Yudhishthira and Devika. Ghatotkacha was the son of Bhima and Hidimbi, Abhimanyu was the son of Arjuna and Subhadra. Babruvahana was the son of Arjuna and Chitrāngadā. Iravan was the son of Arjuna and Ulupi. Niramitra was the son of Nakula and Karenumati. Suhotra was the son of Sahadeva and Queen Vijaya. Upapandavas were the 5 sons of Pandava and Draupadi (Daughter of King Drupada of Panchala).

The following, are monarchs who reigned after the main Mahabharata eneded note: all of them should actually be in the Kurus's of Magadha branch as Parikshit's mother was Uttara who belonged to the Matsya Dynasty which was started by Matsya twin brother of Satyavati and a son of yet again Uparichara Vasu (but I am not transferring all those names to the Magadha section as it's right below this section and I am to lazy) These are the rulers who belonged to the Pandava Dyansty (yes their surname was Pandava and after the death of the 5 Pandavas the family took Pandava as the dyansty and surname)

1. Parikshit III Pandava was the son of Abhimanyu; and grandson of the Pandava Arjuna
2. Janamejaya IV
3. Śatānīka
4. Ashwamedhatta (Ashwamedhaja)
5. Asīmakṛṣṇa
6. Nemicakra
7. Citraratha
8. Vṛṣṭimān
9. Suṣeṇa
10. Sunītha
11. Nṛcakṣu (he had such a horrible name that the Ganga flooded Hastinapura and ended the Kurus/ Pandavs of Hastinapura (don't panic). It ended them by name as after Nrcakṣu's time the Dynasty became the Vatsa Dynasty)
12. Sukhīnala
13. Pariplava
14. Sunaya
15. Nṛpañjaya
16. Timi
17. Bṛhadratha
18. Sudāsa
19. Śatānīka
20. Durdamana
21. Mahīnara
22. Daṇḍapāṇi
23. Nimi
24. Kṣemaka (this is not the end) The Vatsa's were politically extincted by King Mahapadma Nanda (who forced the Vatsa's to flee their own capital) but several Rajput and other factions are Kṣemaka's descendents

==== Magadha dynasty ====
Sudhanva, son of Kuru II, became the King of Magadha.

1. Sudhanva
2. Sudhanu
3. Suhotra II
4. Chyavana
5. Chavana
6. Krtri
7. Kriti
8. Krta
9. Krtyagya
10. Krtavirya
11. Krtasena
12. Krtaka or Kriti II
13. Uparichara Vasu (Devotee of Lord Vishnu and a friend of Devaraja Indra) conquered Chedi Kingdom.
14. Brihadratha (father of Jarasandha and the King of Magadha), Pratyagraha became the King of Chedi whose Great-Grandson was Shishupala, Kusambhi (Vatsa), Mavella, Yadu and Matsya (founder of Matsya Kingdom whose Great-Grandson was Virata who was the founder of Viratanagara) were the sons of Vasu and Vasu daughter Satyavati who later married Shantanu.)
15. Jarasandha
16. Jayatsena and Sahadeva (the sons of Jarasandha and allies of Pandavas.)

==== Brihadratha dynasty ====
Brihadratha, King of Magadha, started the Brihadratha dynasty.

1. Brihadratha
2. Kusaagra
3. Rishabha
4. Satyahita
5. Pushpa
6. Satershita
7. Sudhanva
8. Sarva
9. Bhuvan
10. Jarasanda
11. Sahadeva
12. Marjari
13. Srutasrava
14. Apratipa
15. Niramitra
16. Sukshatra
17. Brihatkarma
18. Syenajit
19. Srutamja
20. Mahabala
21. Succhi
22. Kshemya
23. Anhvrata
24. Dharmanetra
25. Nirvrutti
26. Suvrata
27. Mahasena
28. Sumita
29. Subala
30. Sunetra
31. Satyajita
32. Viswajit
33. Ripunjaya

== Emperor Yadu dynasty ==
Once Yadu dynasty King Yayati was suffering from a curse, he requested his five sons to help relieve him from that curse. All the four sons disagreed to help except the youngest. Yayati cursed his eldest son Yadu that his descendants are not worth to be a royal one. Yadu apologized for the mistake he committed. Yayati gave him a boon that Lord Narayana himself will born in his dynasty. The descendants of Yadu were Sahasrabahu Kartavirya Arjuna, Krishna etc.

=== Heheya Kingdom ===
Sahasrajit was the eldest son of Yadu whose descendant were Haihayas. After Kartavirya Arjuna, his grandsons Talajangha and his son, Vitihotra had occupied Ayodhya which was ruled by Rama's ancestor Sagara's father Bahuka who was also known as Asita. Talajangha, his son Vitihotra were killed by King Sagara. Their descendants (Madhu and Vrshni) exiled to Kroshtas, a division of Yadava Dynasty.

1. Sahasrajit
2. Satajit
3. Mahahaya, Renuhaya and Haihaya (the founder of Haihaya Kingdom). (Contemporary to Suryavanshi king Mandhatri)
4. Dharma was the son of Haihaya.
5. Netra
6. Kunti
7. Sohanji
8. Mahishman was the founder of Mahishmati on the banks of River Narmada.
9. Bhadrasenaka (Bhadrasena) (Contemporary to Suryavanshi king Trishanku)
10. Durmada (Contemporary to Suryavanshi king Harischandra)
11. Durdama
12. Bhima
13. Samhata
14. Kanaka
15. Dhanaka
16. Krtavirya, Krtagni, Krtavarma and Krtauja. (Contemporary to Suryavanshi king Rohitashva)
17. Sahasrabahu Kartavirya Arjuna was the son of Krtavirya who ruled 88 years and was finally killed by Lord Parashurama.
18. Jayadhwaja, Vrshabha, Madhu and Urujit were left by Parshurama and 995 others were killed by Lord Parashurama. Pajanya was adopted by Kroshta king Devamidha
19. Talajangha (Contemporary to Suryavanshi king Asita)
20. Vithihotra (Contemporary to Suryavanshi king Sagara)
21. Madhu
22. Vrshni

=== Kroshta dynasty ===
Yadu had a son named Kroshta whose descendant was Krishna. Once, Satvata and his son Bhima caught hold of Lord Rama's Ashwamedha sacrifice horse and then they were defeated by Hanuman and Shatrughna and the Yadava Kingdom was given to Ikshvaku Dynasty. Rama then gave the kingdom to Shatrughna's son Subahu before his journey to Vaikunta. Then, finally Andhaka (Son of Bhima) recovered his paternal kingdom from Subahu after the journey to Vaikunta of Rama.

1. Yadu was the Founder of Yadu Dynasty and Yadava Kingdom (contemporary of God Parashurama)
2. Kroshta
3. Vrajnivan
4. Vrajpita
5. Bhima I
6. Nivriti
7. Viduratha
8. Vikrati
9. Vikravan
10. Swahi
11. Swati
12. Ushnaka
13. Rasadu
14. Chitraratha I
15. Sashabindu (Contemporary to Suryavanshi King Mandhata)
16. Madhu I (By the name and glory of this king, Lord Krishna was called Madhava and the Yadavas were called Madhu Yadava or Madhavas)
17. Prithushrava
18. Vrishni I was a Yadava king whose dynasty was called as Vrshni Dynasty.

==== Vrishni dynasty ====
Vrishni I was a great Yadava king. His descendants were the Vrishni Yadavas, Chedi Yadavas and Kukura Yadavas. His son was Antara.

1. Antara
2. Suyajna
3. Ushna
4. Marutta
5. Kambhoja was a Bhoja King who founded the Kamboja Kingdom and his descendants were Kambhojas
6. Shineyu
7. Ruchaka
8. Rukmakavacha
9. Jayamadha
10. Vidarbha was the Founder of Vidarbha Kingdom (Contemporary to Suryavanshi King Bahuka)
11. Kratha (Contemporary to Suryavanshi King Sagara)
12. Raivata
13. Vishwagarbha
14. Padmavarna
15. Sarasa
16. Harita
17. Madhu II
18. Madhava
19. Puruvasa
20. Purudvan
21. Jantu
22. Satvata was a Yadava King whose descendants were called Satvatas. (Contemporary to Lord Rama)
23. Bhima II (Contemporary to Suryavanshi King Kusha)
24. Andhaka was another Yadava King whose descendants were called Andhakas.
25. Mahabhoja
26. Raivata (Contemporary to Suryavanshi King Athithi)
27. Vishwagarbha
28. Vasu
29. Kriti
30. Kunti
31. Dhrishti
32. Turvasu
33. Darsha
34. Vyoma
35. Jimuta
36. Vikruthi
37. Bhimaratha
38. Rathvara
39. Navratha
40. Dashratha
41. Ekadasharatha
42. Shakuni
43. Karibhi
44. Devarata
45. Devakshetra
46. Devala
47. Madhu
48. Bhajmana
49. Puruvasha
50. Puruhotra
51. Kumaravansha
52. Kumbalabarhi
53. Rukamatwacha
54. Kuruvasha
55. Anu
56. Pravarta
57. Purumitra
58. Shrikara was a Yadava King who was the disciple of lord Hanuman. After completing education from lord Hanuman, he got a boon from lord Hanuman was that lord Narayana will take birth in Yadu's dynasty.
59. Chitraratha II
60. Viduratha
61. Shoora
62. Sharma
63. Prathikshara
64. Swayambhoja
65. Hridhika
66. Vrishni II
67. Devamidha
68. Surasena was the son of Madisha and Parjanya was the son of Vesparna(2nd wife of Devamidha).
69. Vasudeva and others were the son of Surasena and Nanda Baba was the son of Parjanya
70. Balarama, Krishna and others were the sons of Vasudeva.

Yogmaya was daughter of Nanda Baba.

1. Pradyumna was the son of Krishna.
2. Aniruddha
3. Vajranabha
4. Pratibahu
5. Subahu
6. Shantasena
7. Shatasena

==== Chedi dynasty ====
Yadu's descendant Vidarbha, who was the founder of the Vidarbha Kingdom, has three sons: Kusha, Kratha and Romapada. Kusha was the founder of Dwaraka. Romapada was given central India Madhya Pradesh. King Romapada's descendants were the Chedis. During the reign of Lord Rama, Tamana and his father Subahu II fought against Rama while doing Ashvamedha sacrifice and were defeated by Lord Hanuman. Later, Uparichara Vasu conquered Chedi.

1. Romapada
2. Babhru
3. Krti
4. Ushika
5. Chedi was the founder of the Chedi Kingdom
6. Subahu I (contemporary of Suryavanshi King Rituparna and Nala and Damayanti)
7. Virabahu
8. Subahu II
9. Tamana (contemporary of Lord Rama)

==== Kukura dynasty ====
Vishwagarbha, a descendant of Vrishni had a son named Vasu. Vasu had two sons, Kriti and Kukura. Kriti's descendants were Shurasena, Vasudeva, Kunti, etc. Kukura's descendants were Ugrasena, Kamsa and Devaki, adopted daughter of Ugrasena. After Devaka, his younger brother Ugrasena reigned at Mathura.

1. Kukura
2. Vrshni
3. Riksha
4. Kapotarma
5. Tittiri
6. Punarvasu
7. Abhijit
8. Dhrshnu
9. Ahuka
10. Devaka and Ugrasena
11. Kamsa and 10 others were the children of Ugrasena while Devaki, the daughter of Devaka, was the adoptive daughter of Ugrasena.

== See also ==
- Vedic Period
- Puranic chronology
- History of Hinduism
- Solar dynasty & Lunar dynasty
- List of Indian monarchs
- Turvasu Druhyu and Anu Dynasties
- List of Ikshvaku dynasty kings
- List of Hindu empires and dynasties
