= Madhavi (princess) =

Princess in Hindu mythology

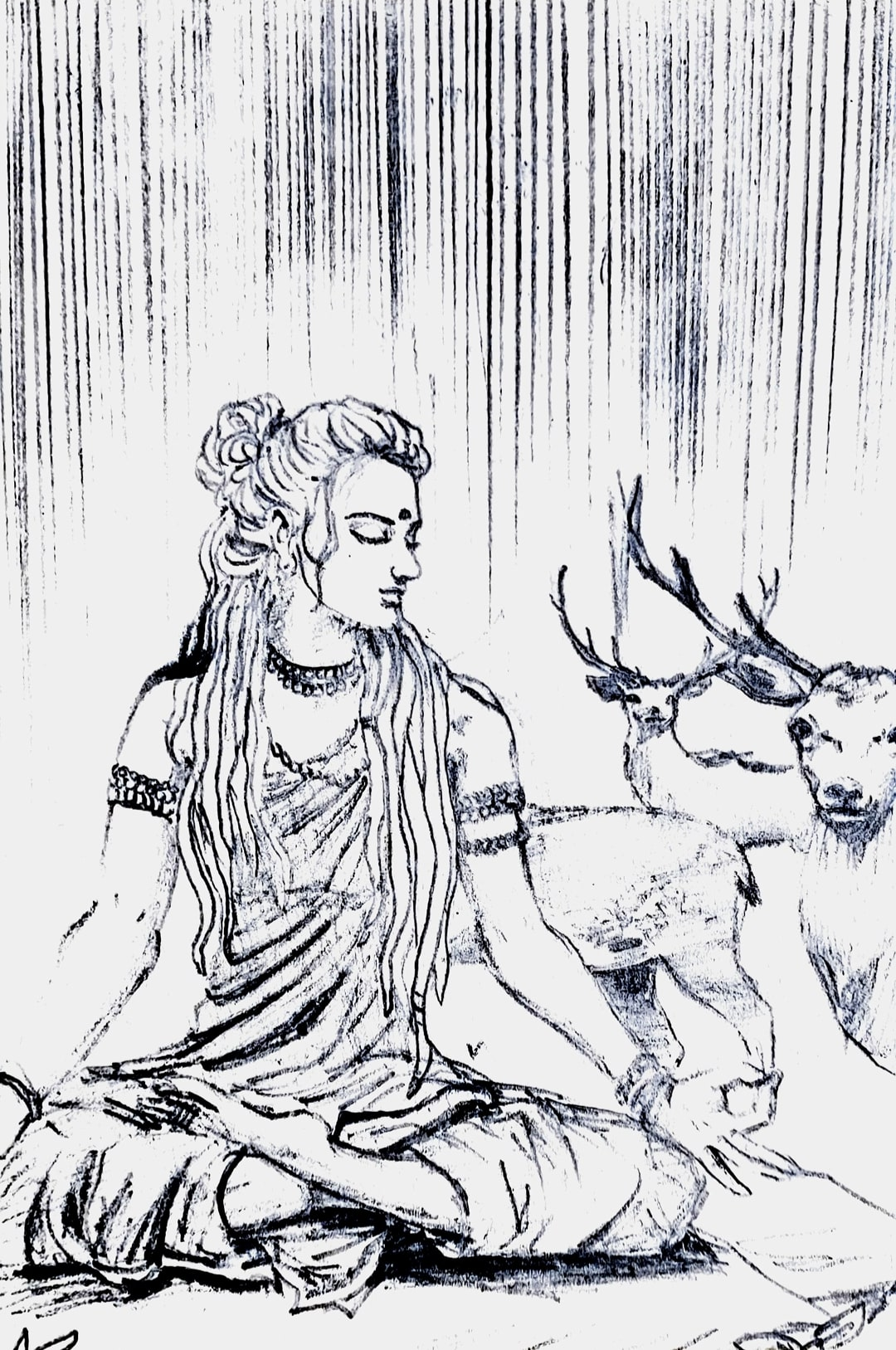
- An illustration of Madhavi in meditation, surrounded by deer
- Texts: Mahabharata
- Gender: Female

Genealogy
- Parents: Yayati (father)
- Siblings: Puru and Yadu (brothers)
- Spouse: Haryashva of Ayodhya; Divodasa of Kasi; Ushinara of Bhoja; Vishvamitra
- Children: Vasumanas (from Haryashva); Pratardana (from Divodasa); Shibi (from Ushinara); Ashtaka (from Vishvamitra)
- Dynasty: Lunar Dynasty

Madhavi (Sanskrit: माधवी, romanized: Mādhavī, lit. 'sweet or intoxicating'), also known as Drishadvati, is a princess and a female ascetic, whose story appears in the Hindu epic Mahabharata. She was the daughter of King Yayati.

Madhavi's primary appearance is in the legend of Galava, a disciple of the sage Vishvamitra. To fulfill his guru-dakshina of eight hundred horses to his teacher, Galava sought the help of King Yayati, who, unable to provide the horses, offered his daughter Madhavi instead. Madhavi was endowed with a unique boon—she could restore her virginity after childbirth and was destined to bear sons who would become great kings. On her own suggestion, Madhavi was successively married to three kings for a fixed period of time: Haryyashva of Ayodhya, Divodasa of Kasi, and Ushinara of Bhoja, in exchange for the horses they had. Each of these unions resulted in the birth of a son, all of whom became significant rulers. Ultimately, Galava offered her to Vishvamitra. She bore Ashtaka and returned to her father. Yayati suggested she marry in a svayamvara and become a queen, but Madhavi instead chose to retire to forest and become an ascetic. She undertook celibacy and performed severe austerity, thus she came to be known as Mrigacharini ('she who lives like a deer'). Years later, when Yayati fell from heaven, Madhavi shared half of the merit she has accumulated from her penance, thus enabling Yayati to regain heaven.

Madhavi's tale is often examined for its reflections on the status of women in ancient Indian society, particularly within the context of marriage, duty, and agency. Her narrative also highlights the intertwining of personal sacrifice with broader societal obligations, a recurring theme in Hindu literature. Though not as prominently known as other female figures in the Mahabharata, Madhavi's story remains a poignant example of the complex roles women played in the epic traditions of India.

== Etymology ==
The name "Mādhavī" is the feminine counterpart of "Mādhava", which is closely related to "madhu", meaning "honey" or "sweetness". "Mādhava" is also a name of Krishna, which implies a connection to divine qualities or something that is beloved and desirable. In the context of Mādhavī's story, her name may carry symbolic significance related to fertility, sweetness, or desirability, aligning with her role in the narrative as a figure who is passed between different kings for the purpose of bearing children. The name might also carry connotations of abundance and prosperity, as "madhu" is often associated with the idea of something that is nourishing and life-giving. This association could underscore Mādhavī's role as a source of heirs and prosperity for the kings who possess her.

The name "Mādhavī" is derived from the Sanskrit root "madhu", meaning "honey" or "sweetness". Etymologically, "madhu" is connected to concepts of sweetness, fertility, and intoxicating substances, such as honey and mead. This root links Mādhavī to a broader Indo-European linguistic and cultural framework, where similar terms are found across various languages. For instance, in Old English, "medu" refers to mead, and in Ancient Greek, "methy" (μέθυ) signifies wine or a strong drink, underscoring a shared Indo-European heritage of associating sweetness and intoxication with themes of fertility and desirability. This connection is further enriched by comparing Mādhavī with Medb, a queen from Irish mythology whose name also derives from a root meaning "intoxicating" or "mead". Both names, rooted in the concept of intoxicating sweetness, highlight the symbolic roles of these women in their respective mythologies.

In later Puranic scriptures like the Brahmanda Purana, Matsya Purana and Vayu Purana, Mādhavī is also referred to by the name "Dṛṣadvatī" (Drishadvati), which is also used for a Vedic river.

== Legend ==
The narrative of Princess Madhavi is found within the Galavacharita of the Mahabharata (Books 5, Chapters 104–121). This tale is recounted during Krishna's diplomatic mission to Duryodhana's court, where Krishna seeks to broker peace between Duryodhana and the Pandavas by urging Duryodhana to share his kingdom. To illustrate the perils of excessive pride (Yayati) and obstinacy (Galava), the sage Narada recounts the story of Madhavi.

The story begins with a divine test of the sage Vishvamitra, orchestrated by the god Dharma, who disguises himself as the sage Vasishtha. Dharma arrives at Vishvamitra's hermitage and requests food. Vishvamitra painstakingly prepares a special rice-mess (caru) for his guest, but Dharma, having already eaten elsewhere, instructs Vishvamitra to wait for him to return. Vishvamitra, displaying remarkable patience and devotion, stands for a hundred years with the caru on his head, subsisting only on air. Pleased by Vishvamitra's unwavering obedience, Dharma declares him a Brahmin, saying, "I am pleased, brahmin seer!". Overjoyed by his transformation, Vishvamitra turns to his devoted disciple Galava, who had faithfully served him for all those years. Vishvamitra offers Galava the freedom to leave, but Galava insists on fulfilling the traditional duty of offering a guru's fee (guru-dakshina). Slightly irritated by Galava's persistence, Vishvamitra demands an impossible fee: eight hundred white horses with one black ear.

Distraught by the enormity of the task, Galava contemplates suicide but is saved by the sudden appearance of Garuda, the divine eagle and mount of the god Vishnu. Garuda offers his assistance, and together they embark on a journey to gather the horses. They first seek help from King Yayati, a ruler whose wealth has diminished over time. Unable to provide the horses, Yayati offers his daughter Madhavi and suggests that Galava marry her to any king who would give him the eight hundred horses he required. Madhavi possesses a unique boon from a sage—after each childbirth, she regains her virginity, and her sons are destined to become great kings.

Following the plan, Galava presents Madhavi to King Haryashva of Ayodhya, who desires progeny but possesses only two hundred of the required horses. At this moment, Madhavi speaks up and reveals that she has been granted a boon to regain her virginity after each childbirth. She then proposes the idea that Galava can give her to four different kings, each of whom can give him two hundred horses in exchange for a son from her. Madhavi bears Haryashva a son named Vasumanas (renowned for being exceedingly charitable), and after the birth, she regains her virginity and returns to Galava. The same process is repeated with King Divodasa of Kashi, who receives a son named Pratardana (who was exceedingly brave), and King Aushinara of the Bhojas, who receives a son named Shibi (renowned for his devotion to truth and righteousness). With six hundred horses collected, Garuda suggests that Galava offer these along with Madhavi to Vishvamitra, instead of continuing the arduous search for the remaining two hundred horses. Galava follows this advice and presents the proposal to Vishvamitra, who agrees. Madhavi bears Vishvamitra a son named Ashtaka, renowned for his sacrificial rituals.

After fulfilling Vishvamitra's request, Galava expresses his gratitude to Madhavi and praises her as the saviour of her father, the kings, and himself. Madhavi returns to her father, Yayati, who arranges a svayamvara (a ceremony where a princess chooses her husband from among assembled suitors) for her at confluence of Ganga and Yamuna. Madhavi's brothers—Yadu and Puru—take her there. However, instead of selecting a husband, Madhavi rejects them all and chooses the life of a recluse and retreats to the forest, living a life of asceticism as a mṛgacāriṇī (a woman who lives like a deer, practicing chastity and penance). Description of her life as an ascetic is attested in the Mahabharata in detail:

Reducing her body by means of fasts of various kinds and religious rites and rigid vows, she adopted the deer's mode of life And subsisting upon soft and green grass-blades, resembling the sprouts of lapis lazuli and which were both bitter and sweet to the taste, and drinking the sweet, pure, cool, crystal, and very superior water of sacred mountain-streams, and wandering with the deer in forests destitute of lions and tigers, in deserts free from forest-conflagration, and in thick woods, that maiden, leading the life of a wild doe, earned great religious merit by the practice of Brahmacharya austerities.

— Mahabharata, Udyoga Parva, Section CXX

Yayati, after ruling for thousands of years, ascends to heaven but eventually loses his standing due to pride. As he falls back to earth, he lands in the Naimisha forest, where his four grandsons—born from Madhavi—are performing a great sacrificial ritual. Madhavi, now an ascetic, arrives there and introduces Yayati to his grandsons. She offers him half of the merit she has accumulated from her penance as a Mrigacharini. Galava also arrives and offers him one-eighth of his merit. Yayati's grandsons also contribute portions of their merit, allowing Yayati to regain his place in heaven.

The story concludes with the god Brahma explaining to Yayati that his downfall was due to the dangers of self-pride, a lesson that Narada uses to caution Duryodhana. He warns Duryodhana that, like Yayati, excessive pride and obstinacy can lead to one's downfall, and urges him to make peace with his cousins, the Pandavas.

== Assessment ==
Several scholars and academics have assessed the myth of Madhavi, presenting various critical examinations of its complexity and the implications it has for understanding the treatment and perception of women in ancient Indian literature.

The first detailed assessment was made by Georges Dumézil in his Mythe et Epopée II in 1971. His analysis of Madhavi focuses on drawing parallels between her story in the Mahabharata and other Indo-European myths, particularly that of Medb (Maeve) from Irish mythology. Dumézil highlights the structural similarities between Madhavi and Medb, suggesting that both figures represent archetypal roles of female sovereignty and fertility in their respective cultures. He argues that these parallels are not coincidental but rather stem from a common Indo-European mythological heritage. In both myths, the female characters are linked to kingship and power, serving as essential elements in the narratives surrounding royal authority and lineage. Dumézil interprets Madhavi's role in the Mahabharata as similar to that of Medb, where both characters embody the concept of sovereignty—Madhavi through her ability to produce sons for various kings, and Medb through her active role in choosing her partners and influencing the succession of kings. Dumézil also examines the ritualistic elements in their respective myths. Both characters are seen as central to the rituals that establish and maintain the power of kings, further reinforcing their roles as symbols of sovereignty. Dumézil's assessment suggests that the portrayal of Madhavi and Medb reflects complex gender dynamics within Indo-European societies. While both women are powerful figures, their power is often exercised within the constraints of patriarchal systems that ultimately control and exploit their bodies and fertility.

Madhavi's treatment by male figures in the story allows the narrative to be analyzed from a distinctly feminist angle. They point out that Madhavi is used as a tool by the men around her, who exploit her for their own benefit, reducing her to a mere commodity. However, many scholars also criticise this view and say that these simple interpretations as reductive, and fail to understand Madhavi's symbolism as a figure of change.

Linguist Stephanie Jamison categorizes Madhavi as a "maiden as commodity", wherein her value is determined by her ability to be exchanged for material gain. Jamison focuses on the economic deliberations that dominate the narrative. The male characters—Galava and the kings—engage in negotiations that appraise Madhavi's worth in purely economic terms, discussing her value in relation to the horses they desire. Despite being the object of these transactions, Madhavi is not entirely without a voice. Jamison notes that Madhavi herself suggests the scheme of sequentially marrying four kings to help Galava fulfill his obligation. However, this agency is framed within the context of her commodification, as her ability to regenerate her virginity after each childbirth makes her perpetually "marketable" within the patriarchal system. Beyond the economic aspects, Jamison embeds her analysis within the ritualistic and cultural practices of ancient India. She interprets Madhavi's story as reflecting the societal norms that dictated women's roles in familial and social transactions. Madhavi is portrayed as a "sacrificed wife", where her body and fertility are repeatedly used by different kings to produce royal heirs. This can be interpreted as a form of ritualistic sacrifice, where Madhavi's role is essential to the continuation of lineage and royal power, but at the expense of her autonomy and well-being. Women like Madhavi were central to rituals of hospitality and exchange, where their value was often tied to their ability to reproduce and secure alliances through marriage or other forms of union. This systemic objectification is part of a larger cultural and ritualistic framework where women's primary role was to facilitate the transfer of wealth, power, and lineage continuity among men.

According to Danielle Feller of the University of Lausanne, Madhavi's story is unusual in the Mahabharata because it involves the clear violation of the accepted dharma, especially concerning the treatment of women. Madhavi is treated as a transactional object, passed between different kings to produce sons, yet this is not portrayed as unethical or wrong within the story. Despite being treated as a commodity, Madhavi is not portrayed as a powerless victim. Feller discusses how Madhavi displays a form of agency, particularly in her acceptance of her fate and the role she plays in fulfilling the desires of the men around her. This acceptance, however, raises complex questions about the nature of her autonomy—whether it is truly self-determined or shaped by the constraints of the patriarchal society she inhabits. Feller also explores the idea that Madhavi's story can be interpreted as a metaphorical sacrifice, drawing parallels to the ashvamedha (horse sacrifice), a ritual associated with kingship and sovereignty. In this light, Madhavi herself is likened to a sacrificial figure, whose fertility and reproductive capabilities are exploited to uphold the power structures of the men around her. Feller highlights Madhavi's elusiveness and lack of attachment as significant aspects of her character, which set her apart from other female figures in the Mahabharata. Feller notes that Madhavi, despite being the central figure in a narrative where she is exchanged among multiple kings, remains emotionally detached from the men who seek to possess her. This detachment is reflected in her decision to renounce worldly life and adopt the ascetic lifestyle of a Mrigacharini (one who lives like a deer), embracing a life of solitude and austerity in the forest. This is also alluded to in her mysterious parentage—despite Yayati having two famous wives, Devayani and Sharmishtha, the name of Madhavi's mother is not revealed in the text. Feller acknowledges that modern readers might find Madhavi's story deeply troubling due to its apparent endorsement of female exploitation. She sees the myth of Madhavi as a multifaceted narrative that challenges traditional interpretations of dharma, gender roles, and power in ancient India.

Indologist and Mahabharata scholar Pradip Bhattacharya, on the other hand, presents a nuanced view that challenges simplistic interpretations of her story as merely an instance of male exploitation or commodification. He argues that Madhavi's actions, particularly her suggestion to Galava to use her to obtain the 800 horses demanded by Vishvamitra, demonstrate a degree of agency and self-determination. Bhattacharya emphasizes that Madhavi herself proposes the plan to be passed between the kings to help Galava fulfill his obligation, indicating that she is not merely a passive victim but an active participant in the events. Therefore, the "usage aspect" of Madhavi is a result of her own proposal to save Galava, rather than something forced upon her, since she could have chosen to stay with the first king, Haryashva, by keeping the secret of her boon hidden. Moreover, Bhattacharya contrasts Madhavi's situation with other women in the Mahabharata, like Kunti, to highlight a pattern of women volunteering for what might seem like exploitation, suggesting that there is a psychological complexity in their motivations. He suggests that these women find some form of self-fulfillment in their actions, which complicates the interpretation of these stories as straightforward examples of patriarchal dominance. Bhattacharya thus underscores the importance of understanding the internal dynamics and psychological make-up of these female characters, rather than dismissing their stories as mere instances of male control.

Professor Lavanya Vemsani critiques modern interpretations of Madhavi's story, highlighting that such readings often misrepresent her character by emphasizing her sexuality or portraying her solely as a victim of male desire. Vemsani asserts that these interpretations diminish the complexity of Madhavi's journey, which emphasizes her character development in the original text. Initially, Madhavi is depicted as a passive figure, fulfilling the obligations of others—particularly her father and Galava—through marriages to four kings and the bearing of children, all while remaining a virgin due to a divine boon. This portrayal reflects the societal expectations imposed on women, prioritizing duty and submission over personal autonomy. However, her narrative undergoes a significant transformation when she rejects further marriage and opts for a life of asceticism in the forest. Vemsani argues that this choice signifies a profound assertion of agency, enabling Madhavi to reclaim control over her life and challenge the patriarchal structures that have previously dictated her actions. Despite this assertion of independence, Vemsani notes that Madhavi's accomplishments are frequently met with silence in the epic, underscoring the gender biases that devalue women's sacrifices in contrast to the accolades received by male counterparts such as Bhishma. Nevertheless, Vemsani posits that Madhavi's narrative subtly challenges patriarchal ideals by emphasizing the significance of daughters—a theme often overshadowed by the preference for sons in Hindu mythology. While Madhavi bears sons, it is ultimately through her actions as a daughter that she assists her father, Yayati, in regaining his place in Heaven. According to Vemsani, this aspect of her story serves as a reminder of the crucial yet often underappreciated roles daughters can fulfill within familial and spiritual frameworks. Thus, she believes that Madhavi's journey encapsulates not only the quest for personal liberation but also a redefinition of the value of women within the context of family and society.

Simon Pearse Brodbeck offers a perspective on Madhavi's narrative in the context of lineage, merit, and gender roles. Brodbeck views Yayati's decision to "loan" his daughter Madhavi to various kings as a calculated gamble to secure his lineage—Yayati's actions are seen as a way to ensure that his name and legacy continue through his daughter's sons, even though this approach risks destabilizing other royal lineages. Brodbeck analyzes the gender dynamics in the narrative, particularly focusing on how Madhavi's role as a woman and mother intersects with patrilineal concerns. Madhavi's actions, and the eventual offering of her merit, challenge the traditional male-dominated lineage system by showing how a woman's merit and her sons can be crucial in preserving and restoring a patrilineal line. The narrative is also analyzed in light of the putrika custom, where a daughter's son serves the role of an heir in his maternal grandfather's line. Brodbeck points out the tension between this custom and the fear it generates in patrilineal societies. Madhavi's sons perform duties akin to those of an heir, but without disrupting their own paternal lineages, suggesting a complex negotiation of gender and lineage norms. Brodbeck also questions the logic of merit transfer in the story—especially with the idea that merit should not be transferable according to some verses. He suggests that the story might be exploring alternative ways of ensuring lineage salvation through the actions of a daughter and her sons, even if this challenges more orthodox views on lineage and inheritance. He notes that Madhavi's actions and her sons' roles allow Yayati to be saved in a manner that is both conventional and unconventional. While Yayati is restored to heaven, the narrative also hints at broader concerns about the sustainability of patrilineal lines, with Madhavi's contribution being both essential and yet not fully aligned with traditional expectations and diverging from the conventional male-centered approach.

=== Mrigacharini ===
In the context of the story of Madhavi, the term mṛgacāriṇī (Mrigacharini), meaning "one who lives like a deer", is significant as it reflects Madhavi's choice to abandon societal life and retreat into the forest. This term is used to describe her ascetic lifestyle after she declines to remarry during the swayamvara organized by her father, Yayati. Instead, she chooses the forest life, symbolizing a complete withdrawal from worldly ties.

The concept of Mrigacharini has broader connotations, indicating a life of renunciation and penance, akin to that of a deer which lives freely in the wilderness, away from human civilization. Madhavi's choice is notable because it challenges the traditional expectations of women in her time, particularly in the context of marriage and familial duties. The text indicates that her decision was met with acceptance by the assembled kings and princes, highlighting the unique nature of her character and the respect she commanded.

Madhavi's lifestyle as a Mrigacharini is described in detail: she lives on grass and water, practices various forms of penance, and is dedicated to chastity. This lifestyle does not align with the typical ascetic practices described in ancient Indian texts, particularly for women, who were rarely depicted as ascetics. According to Feller, the closest equivalent in the Dharmasūtras might be the vaikhānasa mode of life, a subtype of the vānaprastha (hermit), which involves living in the forest and subsisting on minimal resources. However, Madhavi's lifestyle is even more austere and solitary, aligning more with an animal-like existence than that of a typical ascetic.
