= Turvasu Druhyu and Anu dynasties =

Legendary dynasties in Hindu literature

The Turvasu dynasty (Sanskrit: तुर्वसुवंश, romanized: Turvasuvaṃśa), Druhyu dynasty (Sanskrit: द्रुह्युवंश, romanized: Druhyuvaṃśa) and the Anu dynasty (Sanskrit: अनुवंश, romanized: Anuvaṃśa) are the names of three legendary cadet branches of the Lunar dynasty in Hindu literature, featured in the Puranas and the epics Ramayana and Mahabharata.

== Legend ==
According to the Mahabharata, King Yayati surreptitiously married the daitya princess and his wife Devayani's maid, Sharmistha, after she begged him to bear her children. When Devayani learnt of her husband's infidelity to her, she hastened to inform her father, the sage Shukra. Angered, Shukra cursed his son-in-law with premature old age and infirmity. When Yayati begged him to temper the curse, the sage consented, allowing him to exchange its consequences with one of his sons. Yayati asked each of his sons to bear the curse for a time, and all of them refused, except his youngest, Puru. After a thousand years of enjoying the sensual company of his wives, Yayati named Puru his heir and retired to the forest. The Vishnu Purana states that as they had refused to accept their father's curse, Turvasu, Druhyu, and Anu received smaller regions of Yayati's domains to rule for themselves.

== Genealogy ==
Turvasu, Druhyu, and Anu are all described to be the sons of King Yayati. Turvasu is stated to be the king's second son from his first wife, Devayani, while Druhyu and Anu are his first and second sons from his second wife, Sharmishtha. Yadu, the first son of Yayati from Devayani, went on to form a cadet branch named the Yaduvamsha due to being stripped of his heirdom, while Puru, his youngest son from Sharmishtha and eventual heir, continued the main line of the Lunar dynasty, which later also came to be known as Puruvamsha.

The Harivamsha offers descriptions of the descendants and successors of Turvasu, Druhyu, and Anu:

=== Turvasu dynasty ===
- Turvasu
- Vahni
- Gobhān
- Trishānu
- Karandhama
- Marutta
- Sammatā (Daughter of Marutta; She married Samvarta, a descendant of Puru, extinguishing the male line of Turvasu)
- Duhshanta
- Sharutthāma
- Ākrīda
- Pāndya, Kerala, Kola, and Chola

=== Druhyu dynasty ===
- Druhyu
- Babhrusena
- Angārasetu
- Gāndhāra

=== Anu dynasty ===
- Anu
- Dharma
- Ghrita
- Duduha
- Prachetas
- Suchetas

== See also ==
- Amavasu dynasty
- Lunar dynasty
- Yadu dynasty
