= Yayati (novel) =

1959 Marathi novel by V. S. Khandekar

- Cover of English translation
- Author: V. S. Khandekar
- Original title: ययाति
- Translator: Y. P. Kulkarni
- Language: Marathi
- Genre: Historical novel
- Set in: Ancient India
- Publication date: 1959
- Publication place: India
- English publication date: 1978
- Awards: Sahitya Akademi Award (1960); Jnanapith Award (1974)
- OCLC: 10703252

Yayati is a 1959 Marathi-language mythological novel by Indian writer V. S. Khandekar. One of Khandekar's best-known works, it retells the story of the mythological Hindu king, Yayati, from the Hindu epic the Mahabharata. The novel has multiple narrators, and poses several questions on the nature of morality. Scholars have analysed its hero, Yayati, as a representation of modern man. Accepted as classic of Marathi literature, Yayati has won several awards, including the Sahitya Akademi Award in 1960 and the Jnanapith Award in 1974.

== Background ==
In his preface to Yayati, Khandekar states that he was drawn to the original story from the Mahabharata at multiple levels, and for many reasons. The resulting novel is a modern retelling of the story of the Hindu king, who enjoyed all the pleasures of the flesh for a millennium only to realise how empty of meaning was his pursuit of desire.

Khandekar saw modernity, with its materialistic values, as an elephant on the rampage through the delicate garden of traditional virtues and feelings, blurring the distinction between good and evil, between selfishness and compassion, and blinding people to the evils of the world. In response, Khandekar looked to the past and chose the story of Yayati, making use of a kind of tale often dismissed as the fairy stories of old women to describe the vacuousness and futility of contemporary society's endless obsession with avarice and lust. Where Khandekar's previous writing had focused predominantly on style and imagination, in Yayati these concerns are integrated into a form of social realism the author had little explored until this point.

The story is taken from the Yayatopakhyan (lit. The Story of Yayati), a sub-narrative in Adi Parva (The Book of the Beginning) of the Mahabharata. Khandekar builds the original material into a full-length novel, adding several new episodes and developing the narrative as a love story with a theme of morality. In so doing, Khandekar brings new relevance and meaning to the story in the context of modern life. For Khandekar, this novel represents the common man, who "in spite of varied happiness is always discontented and restless, and is blindly running after new pleasures".

== Characters ==
The novel's main characters are:

- Yayati – King of Hastinapur; married Devayani, daughter of Shukracharya, and her maid Sharmishtha
- Nahusha – King of Hastinapur; father of Yati and Yayati
- Yati – Elder brother of Yayati, who became an ascetic
- Devayani – Daughter of Shukracharya, wife of Yayati, and mother of Yadu
- Sharmishtha – Daughter of Asura king Vrishaparva, and mother of Puru; childhood friend of Devayani
- Puru – Illegitimate child of Yayati and Sharmishtha
- Kacha – Friend of Yayati; Devayani's love; like a brother to Sharmishtha
- Angiras – A sage, by whose blessings Yati and Yayati were born
- Shukracharya – Preceptor of the Asuras, and father of Devayani
- Vrishaparva – King of the Asuras, and father of Sharmishtha

While most of the novel's characters appear in the Mahabharata, Khandekar created several new characters. These include Mukulika and Mandar.

== Plot ==
The novel has three narrators: Yayati, Devayani, and Sharmishtha. Each section of the story is narrated in the first person, from the point of view of its respective narrator. The novel's characters generally use language that is romantic, ornamental, and poetic.

Yayati centres on the life of its eponymous hero, Yayati, the king of Hastinapur. Disillusionment characterises Yayati's early life. His faith in motherly love is shattered when he learns that his mother weaned him for fear of losing her beauty. Later, he experiences cruelty and passion that challenge his manhood. He then has a fleeting experience of carnal love.

When Yayati has to leave the security of the palace for Ashvamedha Yajna (a horse sacrifice ritual in Hindu tradition), he meets his elder brother, Yati, who has become an ascetic and abandoned all material pleasures. After this he meets Kacha, in whom he sees the model of a happy, peaceful life. But Yayati is traumatised when his father, Nahusha, dies, and for the first time he realises the destructive power of death. He is gripped by fear and helplessness. In this state of mind, he encounters Mukulika, a maidservant in the palace. Yayati's attempts to bury his grief in carnal pleasure constitute a critical period in his life. He later meets Alaka and experiences sisterly love. But Alaka ultimately falls prey to the Queen Mother's cruelty. Precisely at this time, Yayati learns of a curse that foretold that his father, and his father's children, would never be happy.

The second part of the narrative recounts Yayati's married life. This section reveals Devayani's love for Kacha, and Kacha's quiet but firm refusal. Devayani seeks revenge on Kacha by making advances to Yayati, whom she ultimately succeeds in marrying. Sharmishtha, originally a princess, is now living with Devayani as her maidservant. At this time, Sharmishtha comes into contact with Yayati. Where Devayani is unable to establish any rapport with Yayati, Sharmishtha finds union with him both in body and in mind. A son is born to them, and for a time Yayati is happy. But, one stormy night, Sharmishtha runs away from Hastinapur. Yayati now suffers both estrangement from Devayani and the loss of Sharmishtha. The resulting vacuum in his life hastens him along a path of moral degradation.

Over an 18-year period, Yayati neglects his royal duties and leads a life of pleasure, with women like Madhavi and Taraka. Even when Hastinapur is attacked by its enemies, Yayati continues to neglect his duties out of anger with Devayani and pursuit of a hedonistic lifestyle. His son Yadu is imprisoned. Puru, Yayati's younger son, secures Yadu's release. Then Devayani's father, Shukracharya, seeing his daughter's unhappy marriage and Yayati's degradation, lays a curse of old age on Yayati.

When Yayati finds himself suddenly grown old, his unfulfilled desires trouble him. He asks his sons to lend him their youth. His son Puru comes to his aid and meets his request. But Puru and Sharmishtha's undemanding love for him help Yayati to realise his mistakes. Within a few minutes of accepting Puru's youth, he resolves to return it. Devayani also undergoes a change of heart. At the end of the novel, Yayati hands over responsibility for government to Puru with his blessing, and seeks to retire to a life in the forest with Devayani and Sharmishtha. This completes Yayati's journey from attachment to detachment.

== Deviations from the Mahabharata ==
In the novel, Khandekar makes several significant departures from the original story of the Mahabharata.

The first of these concerns the death of Yayati's father, Nahusha. In The Mahabharata, Nahusha is cursed by the Rishis (sages) to live on earth in the form of a serpent. After long suffering, he eventually meets Pandava king Yudhishthira, who frees him from the curse. The novel, in contrast, shows Nahusha dying in his palace, desperately clinging to life. He pleads with his wife and son to give him a few hours of their own lives so that he may live a little longer. He fears death because of his remaining unfulfilled desires. Nahusha's helpless struggle with death leaves his son Yayati with a lasting sense of insecurity that affects his whole life.

In the original story of the Mahabharata, Yayati enjoys his son Puru's youth for a thousand years. He then returns Puru's youth, and goes on to live for many years more with sages in the Himalayas before finally ascending to Heaven. In the novel, however, Yayati can return his son's youth only at the cost of his own life. Nonetheless, within a few minutes of accepting Puru's youth Yayati decides to return it. He is saved from death by Kacha, who uses the Sanjeevani Mantra.

== Analysis ==
The main characters of Yayati have been interpreted as representing major attitudes to life. Yayati embodies material pleasure-seeking. Devayani shows excessive pride and desire for power, where Sharmishtha epitomises selfless, undemanding love. Kacha symbolises morality and moderation, a clean enjoyment of life and a sense of the well-being of the human race. Yati's rejection of all material pleasures serves as a counterpoint to Yayati.

The novel poses several moral questions, which include: how to define a fulfilling life; where to place the boundary between morality and immorality; and where the pursuit of material pleasure fits into the context of spiritual values.

== Reception ==
Yayati is one of Khandekar's best-known works, and has been described as one of the greatest works in Marathi literature. The novel has won several awards, including the Sahitya Akademi Award in 1960, the Jnanapith Award in 1974, and the State Government Award in 1960.

== Translations ==
Yayati was translated into English in abridged form by Y. P. Kulkarni, as Yayati : A Classic Tale of Lust (1978). The Malayalam translation, by P. Madhavan Pillai, was serialised in the Malayalam weekly Mathrubhumi in 1980, and published in book form the same year. It was translated into Hindi by Moreshwar Tapaswai and published by Rajpal and Sons in 1990. The novel was translated into Kannada by V.M. Inamdar.
