= Pratardana =

King in Hindu literature

- Texts: Upanishads, Puranas, Ramayana, Mahabharata
- Region: Kashi

Genealogy
- Parents: Divodasa (father), Madhavi (mother)
- Children: Ashtaka
- Dynasty: Chandravamsha

Pratardana (Sanskrit: प्रतर्दन, romanized: Pratardana, lit. 'piercing') is a king of the Chandravamsha (Lunar dynasty) featured in Hindu literature. He is also called Dyuman, Shatrujit, Vatsa, Rithadhvaja, and Kuvalayashva. He is the son of King Divodasa of Kashi and Madhavi, the daughter of King Yayati. He is the father of Ashtaka.

== Legend ==
=== Ramayana ===
Pratardana is depicted as an ally of Rama in the Ramayana, and is described to have been praised by the avatara of Vishnu for assisting Bharata in the arrangements of his coronation ceremony.

A tale based in the narrative of the Ramayana states that once, Pratardana made preparations to travel to Ayodhya to pay his respects to King Rama. He encountered Sage Narada during this journey. Narada made the king promise that he would not offer obeisance to Sage Vishvamitra at Rama's court. Pratardana acted accordingly when he arrived at the court. Vishvamitra grew furious at the lack of respect shown to him, and complained to Rama. Angered, Rama removed three arrows from his quiver and vowed to take the life of the king of Kashi before sunset. Terrified of the consequences, Pratardana sought the protection of Narada, who directed him to Anjana, the mother of Hanuman. Anjana requested her son to help the king. Hanuman flew Pratardana to the banks of the river Sarayu, and told him to wade waist-deep into the water and remain there, repeating Rama's name. Afterwards, he flew to Rama, and made a supplication: Any person who chanted the name of Rama would be protected by him, and no power in the universe, even God himself, would be able to harm such a person. Rama readily granted this. Thus, even as Rama fired his three arrows at Pratardana from his palace, he was saved by Hanuman due to the fact that he chanted Rama's name. When the king continued to chant the name of Rama in the presence of Vishvamitra, the sage was impressed by his piety and relieved Rama of his vow.

=== Mahabharata ===
At the ashvamedha (horse-sacrifice consecration) ceremony of Ashtaka, Pratardana, along with his fellow kings Vasumanas and Sivi, asked the divine sage Narada which of them would have to depart from their reward of stay at Svarga (heaven of the devas) first after their demise. Narada told them that Ashtaka would have to depart first due to his pride, and when enquired once more, stated that Pratardana would be the second. When enquired, the sage stated that he had once lived at the abode of Pratardana for a time, and regaled an incident in which a Brahmin sought a horse from the king while the two were riding upon a chariot. The king wished to give the man a horse after he had returned from his journey, but the latter insisted that he offered him one right then and there. Pratardana granted the Brahmin the horse that had been yoked on the right-hand wheel of his vehicle. Soon, a few more Brahmins appeared to seek the rest of the king's horses. While the king granted the men his horses and began to pull the chariot forward manually, he made a disparaging comment against them after they had left. Narada stated that this was the reason why he would leave Svarga second.
