= Athmanatheswarar Temple =

Coordinates: 10.860359°N 79.069103°E

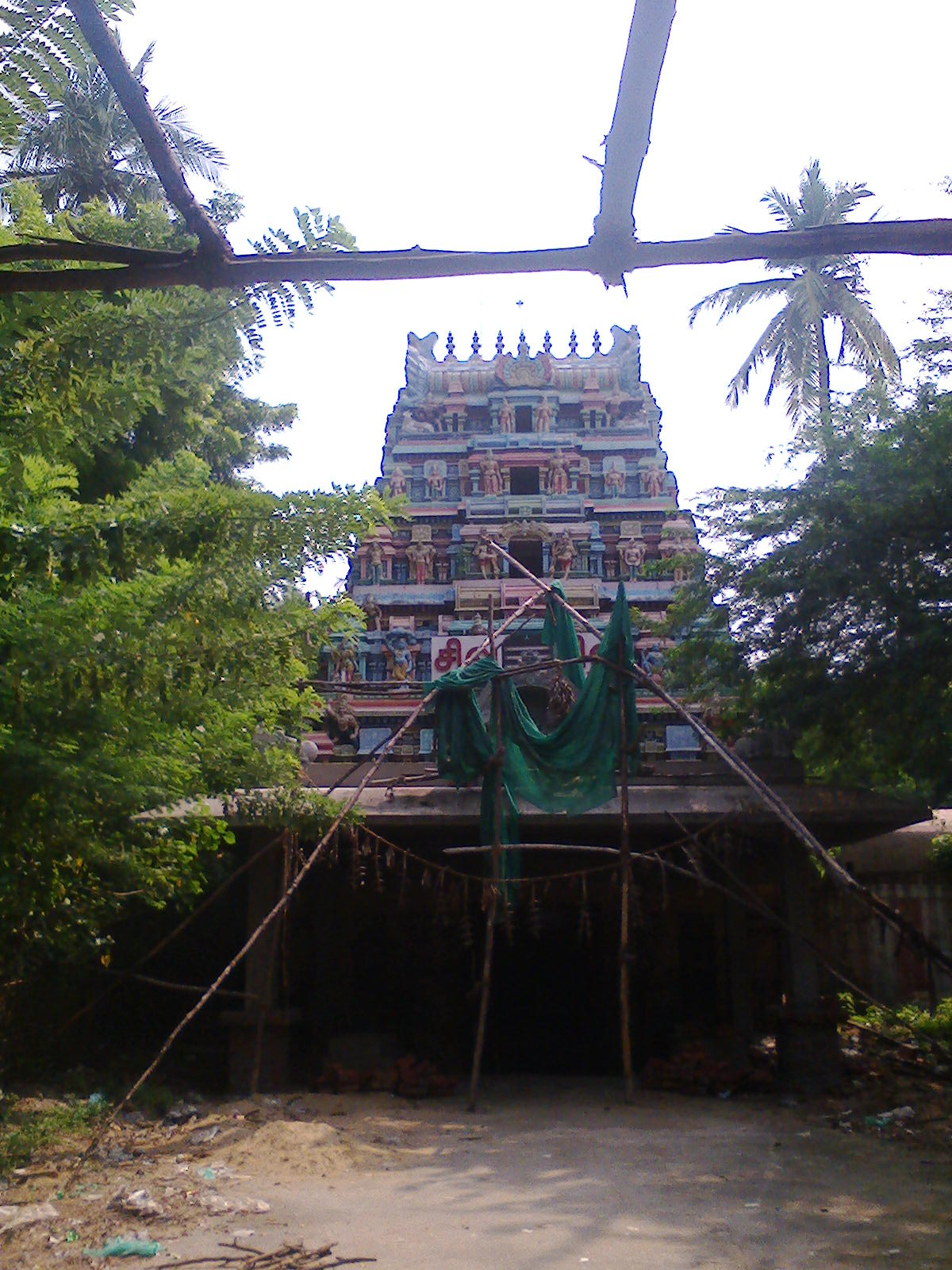
The entrance of the temple

Athmanatheswarar Temple (ஆத்மநாதேஸ்வரர் கோயில்) is a Hindu temple located at Thiruvalampolil in the Thanjavur district of Tamil Nadu, India. The temple is dedicated to Shiva.

Pushpavana Nathar Temple, another Padal petra sthalm is located nearby in the same village.

== Significance ==
It is one of the shrines of the 275 Paadal Petra Sthalams. The Nayanmar saint Thirunavukkarasar has sung praises of the temple in the Thevaram. The shrines is frequented by people to remove obstacles in marriage alliances or to have children.

== Shrines ==
The principal shrine is to Shiva as Athmanatheswarar. There are idols of Nataraja, Ganesha, Linga, Dakshinamurti, Chandikeswarar, Kasi Viswanatha and Murugan with his consorts Valli and Devayani and the Navagrahas along the corridors of the temple.
