= Yayati =

King in Hindu tradition

- King of the Lunar Dynasty
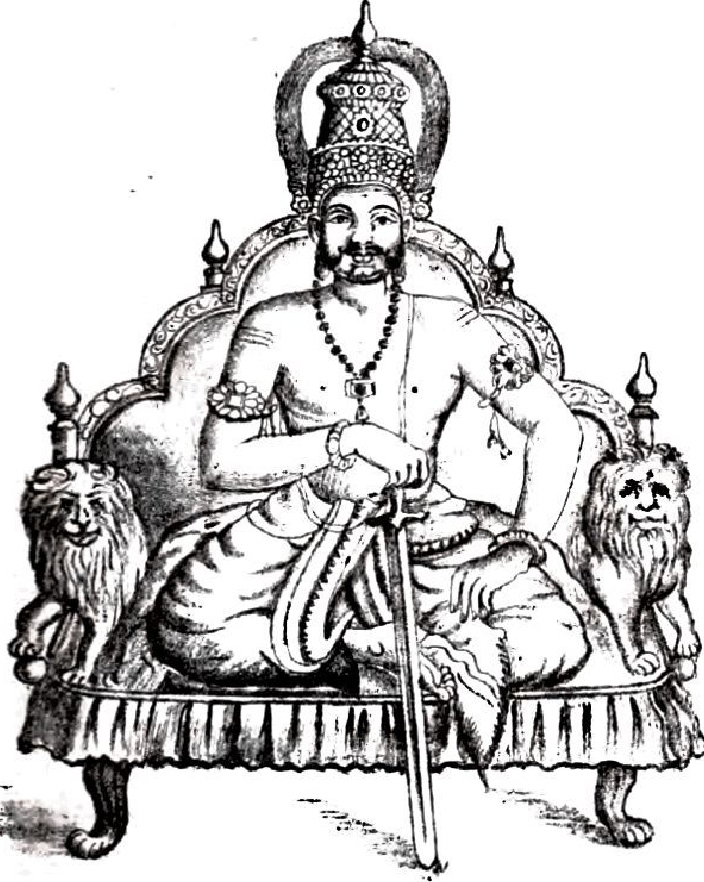
- An illustration of Yayati on a throne
- Predecessor: Nahusha
- Successor: Puru
- Texts: Mahabharata, Puranas

Genealogy
- Parents: Nahusha (father); Viraja or Ashokasundari (mother)
- Spouse: Devayani, Sharmishtha
- Children: Yadu, Turvashu, Anudruhyu, Druhyu, Puru sons); Madhavi (daughter)
- Dynasty: Chandravamsha

Yayati (Sanskrit: ययाति, romanized: Yayāti) is an emperor in Hindu tradition. He is described to be a Chandravamsha king. He is regarded as the progenitor of the lineages of the Yadavas and the Pandavas.

According to the Harivamsa, Yayati is the son of King Nahusha, and his wife, Virajas, the daughter of Pitris, and has five brothers: Yati, Samyati, Ayati, Viyati, and Kriti. Yayati had conquered the whole world and was the Chakravarti ("Universal Monarch" or "World Emperor").

He married Devayani, the daughter of Shukra, and also took Sharmishtha, daughter of king Vrishaparvan, and the maid of Devayani, as his mistress. Upon hearing of his relationship with Sharmishtha, Devayani complained to her father, who in turn cursed Yayati to old age in the prime of life, but later allowed him to exchange it with his son, Puru. His story finds mention in the Mahabharata's Adi Parva, as well as in the Bhagavata Purana and the Matsya Purana.

== Genealogy and early life ==
Brahma's son was Atri, a Brahmarshi. Atri's son was Chandra, the moon god. Chandra lent his name to the Lunar dynasty (Candravaṃśa). Chandra's son was Budha. Budha had a son with Vaivasvata Manu's daughter, Ila. Ila's son was Pururavas, who studied under Sage Kashyapa. Pururavas married the apsara Urvashi and had many sons, of whom Ayus was the eldest. Ayus completed his education from Sage Chyavana and married the asura princess Prabha. Ayus's son was Nahusha, who was educated by the Sage Vashistha.

Upon Indra's loss of power, the devas asked Nahusha to be the new Indra. Nahusha ruled over the three worlds with the guidance of Sage Brihaspati for 100 years. Nahusha's sons, headed by Yati and Yayati, were educated by thousands of Brahmarshis and the devas who used to wait upon their father. Nahusha eventually became arrogant, and was punished severely, as he was cursed by the saptrishi (seven sages) to be snake and to live further in Naraka (Hell). Indra was once more reinstated as the king of the devas.

The Mahabharata mentions about Yayati's achievements. He performed 100 Rajasuyas, 100 Ashvamedhas, 100 Vajapeyas, 1000 Atiratras, 1000 Pundarikas and innumerable Agnishthomas and Chaturmasyas. Wherever he hurled a Shami stick, he performed a sacrifice. He gave away mountains of gold and billions of cows to Brahmanas.

== Legend ==
The legend of Yayati appears in the eighteenth and nineteenth chapters of the ninth canto of the Bhagavata Purana.

Yayati's father, Nahusha, is transformed into a python by a curse uttered by the sages, as punishment for his arrogance. Yayati's elder brother, Yati, is initially given the kingdom, but turns it down, and instead becomes an ascetic. Yayati then becomes king in his place and rules the earth. He appoints his four younger brothers to rule the world's cardinal directions.

=== Marriage ===
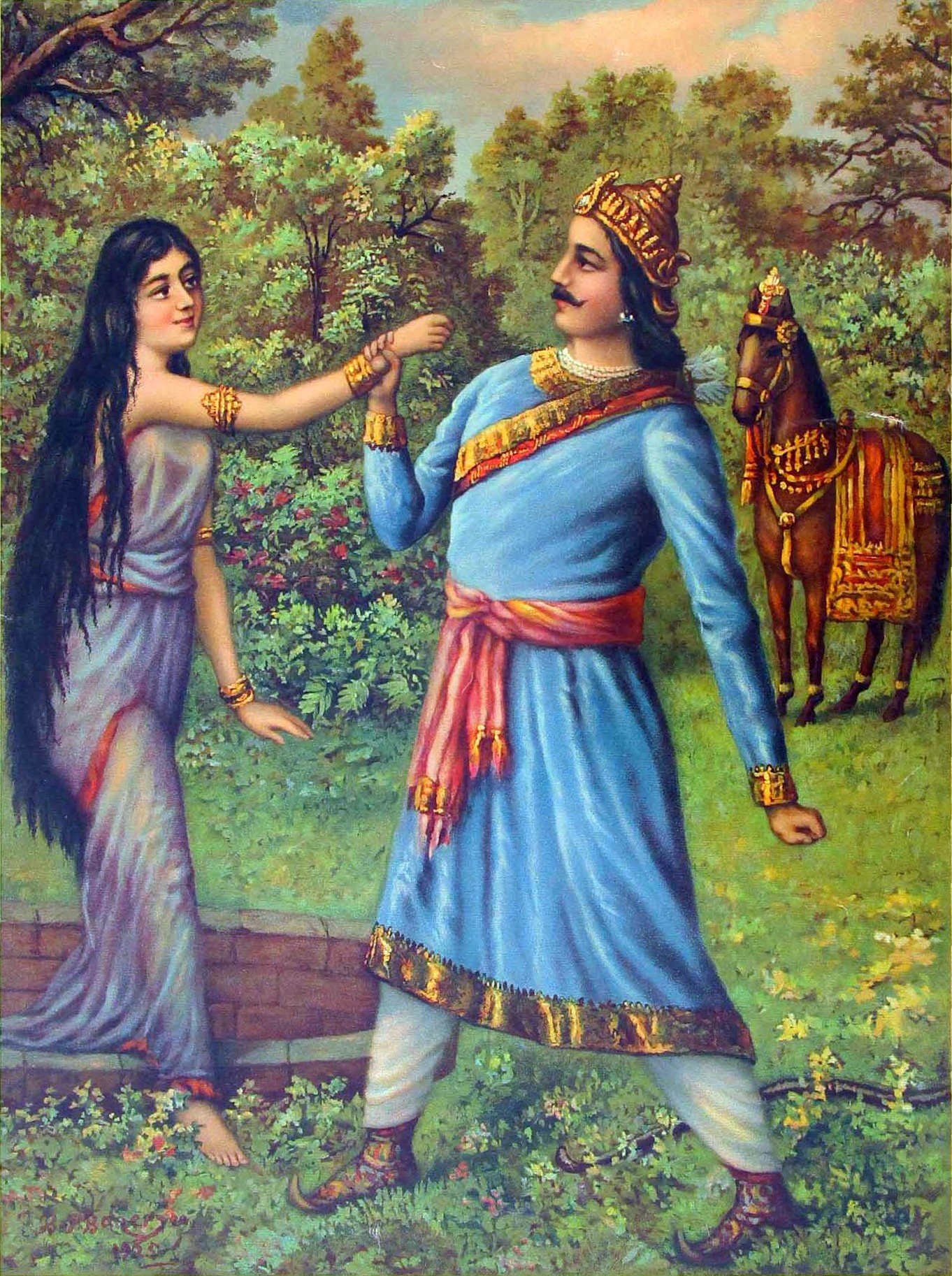
Yayati saves Devayani, print by BP Banerjee

One day, Sharmishtha, daughter of the daitya king Vrishaparvan, and Devayani, daughter of Shukra, go with Sharmishtha's retinue to bathe in a forest pool not far from their home. While they bathe, Indra transforms himself into a strong wind, collecting their clothes upon the stream's banks, and depositing them in a heap. In the ensuing confusion, the two women accidentally don each other's clothes. In the quarrel that ensued, Sharmishtha throws the naked Devayani into a well, and leaves the forest with her retinue. Later, Yayati, son of Nahusha, chanced upon the pool after hunting, and helps Devayani to climb out of it, before returning to his kingdom. Devayani sent her maid, Ghurnika, to her father, and informed him about the quarrel. Shukra is enraged, and to placate him, Vrishaparvan agrees to offer a thousand maids, along with his daughter Sharmishtha, to serve Devayani. Some time afterwards, Yayati meets Devayani again, and the two fall in love. After Shukra offers his consent, the two marry.

When Devayani moves to Yayati's palace after her marriage, Sharmishtha, now her maidservant, also goes along. Shukra, however, sternly warns Yayati never to have any affairs with Sharmishtha.

=== Curse ===
After a long while, Sharmishtha comes to Yayati, and requests him to give her a child. He refuses, stating that if he were to do so, he would face the wrath of Shukra. Nevertheless, Sharmishtha manages to convince him, saying that it would be against dharma if he were to refuse her request; he being the king, it was his responsibility to ensure the needs of the citizens, and she is desperate to have a child. He reluctantly agrees, and they begin an affair, in the hopes that she would conceive. In due course, Devayani gives birth to two sons: Yadu and Turvasu, while Sharmishtha begets three sons: Druhyu, Anudruhyu, and Puru.

Eventually, Devayani learns of her husband's affair with Sharmishtha, and complains to her father. Enraged at his son-in-law's infidelity, Shukra curses Yayati with premature old age in punishment for inflicting such pain upon his daughter. However, on learning Sharmishtha's desire to become a mother, he later relents, telling Yayati that if he could persuade one of his (Yayati's) sons to swap ages with him, he will be able to escape the curse, and regain his lost youth for a while. Yayati asks his sons if one of them would give up his youth to rejuvenate his father, but all refuse except the youngest, Puru (one of his sons by Sharmishtha). In grateful recognition of Puru's filial devotion, Yayati makes him his legitimate heir, and it is from the line of Puru - later King Puru - that the Kuruvamsha (Kuru dynasty) later arises.

In the words of the story, Yayati enjoys all the pleasures of the senses 'for a thousand years' and, by experiencing passion to the full, comes to realise its utter futility, saying: "Know this for certain... not all the food, wealth and women of the world can appease the lust of a single man of uncontrolled senses. Craving for sense-pleasures is not removed but aggravated by indulgence even as ghee poured into fire increases it....One who aspires to peace and happiness should instantly renounce craving and seek instead that which neither grows old, nor ceases - no matter how old the body may become." Having found wisdom by following the road of excess, Yayati gratefully returns the youth of his son Puru, and takes back his old age in return, renouncing the world to spend his remaining days as a forest ascetic. His spiritual practices are, at long last, blessed with success and, alone in the deep woods, he is rewarded with ascension to Svarga - the heavenly realm of the righteous, ruled by Indra, that is but one step below the ultimate liberation of moksha.

=== Afterlife ===
Yayati ascended to heaven due to his virtues. He was so virtuous that he could travel to many celestial regions. Sometimes, he went to the region of Brahma and sometimes stayed at Amaravati, the region of Indra. One day, when Yayati and Indra were conversing, Indra asked him questions. Indra asked him how many sacrifices he did and whom he was equal to in sacrifices. Yayati boastingly said the number of his sacrifices was innumerable, and proclaimed his superiority. Indra was angered by this bragging, and threw Yayati out of heaven. Yayati begged his pardon, so Indra said even though he would be thrown out of heaven, he would fall amidst virtuous and wise humans. Thus, while Yayati fell from the celestial region, he got stuck in the firmament. His grandsons: Ashtaka, Vasuman, Prattarddana, and Sivi (kings and sons of Mamata or Madhavi) met him. They enquired who he was, and why he was thus. They asked about heaven, about hell, about rebirth. Yayati recited everything. Then, out of compassion, they offered their own meritorious powers to Yayati. With these merits, Yayati attained again the realm of heaven. Five golden chariots arrived and took them to the region of eternal bliss, because of the merits of his grandsons and his own.

== Descendants ==
=== From Devayani ===
- Yadu gave rise to the Yaduvamsha, the ancestral lineage of Krishna
- Turvasu and his descendants formed the Yavana kingdom
- Madhavi married four times and had one son with each husband. She married Haryaśva, who belonged to the Suryavamsha dynasty; Divodasa, King of Kashi; Ushinara, King of Bhoja, and the Maharishi Vishvamitra.
  - With the Ikshvaku King Haryaśva, she had a son named Vasumanas, who became a wealthy king, and practised charity
  - With Divodasa, the King of Kaśi, she had the mighty warrior King Pratarddana who acquired weapons from Sage Bharadvaja, and defeated the Haihayas and the Videhas in battle
  - With the Bhoja king Ushinara, she had Shibi, who became a Chakravarti and conquered the world, and practised dharma and charity
  - With Sage Vishvamitra, she had a son named Ashtaka, who became famous for performing sacrifices and charity

=== From Sharmishtha ===
- Druhyu and his descendants, the Vaibhoja Vamsha, according to Tripura tradition, are believed to have formed the Twipra kingdom.
- Anudruhyu gave rise to a Mleccha tribe, Tusharas (Tukharas), with their kingdom being located in the north west of India as per the epic Mahabharata. In Bhagavata Purana, the Uśīnaras, the Sibi, the Madras, and the Kekayas are the direct descendants of Anudruhyu. Sibi or Sivi is stated to be son of Usinara.
- Puru

Another one of his descendants (through Puru) was King Bharata, the son of King Dushyanta and Shakuntala. Further descendants were part of the Kuru kingdom, including Shantanu, Dhritarashtra, Pandu, Yudhishthira, Abhimanyu, and Parikshit.

== Influence ==
In modern language and usage, trading conscientious behaviour for external gain is sometimes called Yayati Syndrome.

Yayati, a Marathi novel by V. S. Khandekar, won him the Sahitya Akademi Award (1960), and a Jnanpith Award (1974).

Playwright Girish Karnad's debut play Yayati (1961) is based on the story of King Yayati found in the Mahabharata.

== See also ==
- Lunar dynasty
- Kuru
- Puru
- Yaduvamsha
- Solar dynasty
- Rama
