= P. Madhavan Pillai =

Indian Malayalam-language writer and translator

- Born: 28 January 1941; Travancore, British India
- Died: 26 March 2022 (aged 81); Perunna, Changanassery, Kottayam district, Kerala
- Occupations: Writer, Translator
- Writing career
- Notable awards: Sahitya Akademi Translation Prize 1994; Kerala Sahitya Akademi Award

P. Madhavan Pillai (28 January 1941 – 26 March 2022) was a polyglot, writer and translator from Kerala, India. He translated about 25 books from other languages into Malayalam, among them, the main work is 'Yayati'. He also translated many noted works from Malayalam to Hindi. He received many awards including the Sahitya Akademi Translation Prize in 1994 and Kerala Sahitya Akademi Award.

== Biography ==
P. Madhavan Pillai was born on 28 January 1941, at Mainagapally in the present-day Kollam district, to G Parameswaran Pillai and Kunhipillayamma. After passing MA in Hindi from Thiruvananthapuram University College with first rank, he worked as a teacher in various colleges run by NSS management. Even after retiring from teaching, he went to take classes. He also served as Professor of Hindi at Sree Sankaracharya University of Sanskrit, chairman of the Board of Hindi Studies at MG University and Member of the Hindi Advisory Committee at the Indian Union Ministry of Parliamentary Affairs.

Madhavan Pillai died on 26 March 2022. He was being treated for cancer. He died at Perunna NSS Medical Mission Hospital in Changanassery.

=== Personal life ===
Madhavan Pillai and his wife T. Yamuna has two children.

== Literary career ==
The most notable work of Madhavan Pillai, who wrote poems in his early days of teaching, is his translation of 'Yayati'. In 1974, when V. S. Khandekar's Marathi novel was awarded the Jnanpeeth, it was Sriram Menon, a teacher who was also a relative, who asked him to translate it into Malayalam. "I respect you for translating the most excellent work in a most excellent way", literary critic Prof. M.Krishnan Nair wrote this in his letter to Madhavan Pillai, when the first edition of 'Yayati' was published in 1980.

Madhavan Pillai's other noted translations into Malayalam include Ashapurna Devi's Bengali works like 'Prthamapratishruti', 'Suvarnalata', 'Bakulinte Katha', Virendra Kumar Bhattacharya's 'Mrityunjaya' from Assamese, 'Dakshinakamarupinte Gatha' by Indira Goswami, 'Draupadi' (Janapeeth) and 'Silapadmam' by Pratibha Rai from Oriya, 'Mahanayakan' from Marathi, From Hindi 'Rajikath' by Jainendra Kumar 'Tamas' by Bhishmasahni, 'Malika' by Mayyadas, and 'Kurukuru Swaha' by Manohar Shyam Joshi, and U.R. Ananthamurthy's 'Mouni' from Kannada.

Madhavan Pillai also translated many noted works from Malayalam to Hindi, including the play 'Bharatavakyam' by poet G. Shankara Kurup, poems by ONV Kurup, Sugathakumari, Vishnunarayanan Namboothiri, D. Vinayachandran and stories by Karoor Neelakanta Pillai, Lalithambika Antharjanam, T. Padmanabhan, N.P. Mohammed etc. Apart from translations, he also prepared Hindi - Malayalam, Malayalam - Hindi, Malayalam - English - Hindi and many other dictionaries.

Madhavan Pillai's work 'Yayathi' was the textbook for BA Malayalam at MG University and MA Malayalam at Kaladi Sree Sankaracharya Sanskrit University.

== Awards and honors ==
Madhavan Pillai has received more than 22 awards including Sahitya Akademi Translation Prize, Kerala Sahitya Akademi Award, National Human Rights Commission of India Literary Award, Award by Kerala State Institute of Children's Literature, Bharat Bhavan Translation Comprehensive Contribution Award and MN Satyarthi Award.

He received the Sahitya Akademi Award for the translation of Mayyadas's 'Maalika' into Malayalam and Kerala Sahitya Akademi Award for the translation of 'Shilapatmam' and the National Human Rights Commission's Literary Award for the Hindi translation of the book 'Kurunukale Map', a collection of essays on human rights.
