= Vyushitashva =

King in Hindu texts

- Texts: Mahabharata

Genealogy
- Parents: Shankhana (father)
- Spouse: Bhadra
- Children: Three Shalvas and four Madras
- Dynasty: Chandravamsha

Vyushitashva (Sanskrit: व्युषिताश्व, romanized: Vyuṣitāśva) is a king featured in Hindu literature. He is the son of King Shankhana, of the Chandravamsha (Lunar dynasty). His legend is described in the Mahabharata. Vyushitashva marries Bhadra, the daughter of King Kakshivat, who is renowned for her beauty.

== Legend ==
Vyushitashva is described to have been a righteous king in the Mahabharata, stated to have performed a great sacrifice, in which all the celestial deities came, led by Indra. After this sacrifice, Vyushitashva attained great power and through the horse-sacrifice ceremony (ashvamedha), he conquered the kingdoms of all cardinal directions. He is said to have donated much of his riches to the Brahmanas. He was married to Bhadra, whom he loved very much, but had no progeny. He died due to his habit of consumption. Bhadra became afflicted with grief, and intended to die along with her husband. But then an incorporeal voice indicated her to lie down with the king's body on the eighth and fourteenth day of the fortnight. She followed the guidance of the voice and from that intercourse, she gave birth to seven sons - three Shalvas and four Madras.
