= Usinara kingdom =

Ancient Indian kingdom

The Ushinara kingdom (Sanskrit: उशीनर, romanized: Uśīnara) was kingdom which appears in the Ramayana and Mahabharata.

== Mahabharata references ==
There are many references to Usinaras in the epic Mahabharata. At several places, it refers to king Usinara and his son prince Sibi or Sivi whose charity has been enormously glorified by sage Markandeya.

=== Usinara prince in Draupadis’ Sywayamvara ===
Adi Parva of Mahabharata says that prince Sivi, son of Usinara had attended Draupadi's self-choice (Swayamvara; "groom-choosing") ceremony along with the kings of neighbouring kingdoms viz Shalya, the king of Madra kingdom, with his son, the heroic Rukmangada, Rukmaratha, Somadatta (king of Bahlika kingdom) of the Kuru race with his three sons - Bhuri, Bhurisrava, and Sala and Sudakshina Kamboja the arch-bowman of the Puru race See Ganguli's Trans: .

=== Usinaras in Kurukshetra War ===
The Usinaras had joined the Kurukshetra War on the side of Kauravas. Karna Parava refers to the Kekayas, the Malavas, the Madrakas, the Dravidas of fierce prowess, the Yaudheyas, the Lalittyas, the Kshudrakas, the Usinaras, the Tundikeras, the Savitriputras etc. who had supported Karna on 17th day of the war, as all having been slain by Arjuna.

=== Usinaras as degraded Kshatriyas ===
Anusasana Parva of Mahabharata states that the tribes of the Sakas, Yavanas, Kambojas, Dravidas, Kalingas, Pulindas, Usinarass, khasas, Kolisarpas, Mahishakas and others were originally noble Kshatriyas but became Vrishalas (degraded Kshatriyas) due to their lose of contact with the Brahmanas.

=== Further epic references ===
According to Mahabharatra, Sibi was son of the king of Usinara country near Gandhara. The charity and devotion of prince Sibi have been greatly extolled by the sage Markandeya in the epic.

Mahabharata also speaks of Usinara princes as sacrificing on two small streams near Jamna There was also one king Usinara i.e. king of Usinara country, contemporary of king Janaka of Videha. Garagya Balaki, a contemporary of Janaka lived for some time in Usinara country.

Mahabharata (and Katha sarit-sagara) refer to Usinaragiri which is located near Kankhala at the point where Ganges issues from the hills. It is said to be identical with Usiragiri of Divayavadana and Usira-dhvaja of Vanaya texts.

There is also an epic reference Suyajna, the king of the Usinaras.

In the Sabha Parva of the epic, Krishna tells that Usinara had a daughter named Aushinara. Aushinara married sage Gautama, at Magadha, the kingdom of Jarasandha. She gave birth to many children, including monarchs like Kakshivat.

== Bhagavata Purana and the Usinaras ==
Bhagavata Purana attests that the prince of Usinara along with princes from Matsya, Kosala, Vidharbha, Kuru, Srnjaya, Kamboja, Kekaya, Madra, Kunti, Anarta, Kerala was present at Samanta-pancaka in Kurukshetra at the occasion of the solar eclipse.

Bhagavata Purana also states that the Usinaras, the Sibi, the Madras, and the Kekayas were the direct descendants of Yayati's son Anu. Sibi or Sivi is stated to be son of Usinara.

Consequently, in the literature, the Usinaras are often associated with the Shivis or Sibis (Sibois of the Greek writings) whose chief town Sibipura has been identified with Shorkot, in Jhang district in Pakistan.

== Usinara in Buddhist literature ==
There is a Buddhist reference to one Usinara, said to be king of Benares who lived in the time of Kassapa Buddha. His story is related in the Maha-Kanha Jataka. He is mentioned in a list of kings who, although they gave great gifts, could not get beyond the domain of sense. It is however, not clear if this Usinara was from the Usinara clan or else it was his personal name only.

== See also ==
- Madra kingdom
- Kekaya kingdom
