= Ashokasundari =

Hindu goddess, daughter of deities Shiva and Parvati

- Digital rendering of Ashokasundari.
- Other names: Bala Tripurasundari, Okha, Lavanya, Anvi, Viraja
- Devanagari: अशोकसुन्दरी
- Sanskrit transliteration: Aśokasundarī
- Affiliation: Devi
- Abode: Mount Kailash
- Day: Monday
- Texts: Padma Purana

Genealogy
- Parents: Shiva (father); Parvati (mother)
- Siblings: Ganesha (brother), Kartikeya (brother)
- Consort: Nahusha
- Children: Yayati and a hundred daughters

Ashokasundari (Sanskrit: अशोकसुन्दरी, IAST: Aśokasundarī) is a Hindu goddess. She is celebrated as the daughter of the deities Shiva and Parvati, and the consort of King Nahusha. While she is prominently featured in the Padma Purana, her narrative is notably absent from most other major classical Hindu scriptures.

== Etymology ==
Ashokasundari was miraculously created from the wish-fulfilling tree Kalpavriksha after Parvati sought a daughter to ease her profound isolation. The components of her name directly reflect the circumstances of her birth: Ashoka signifies the alleviation of Parvati's shoka, which means "sorrow", while sundari denotes her exceptional beauty as a "beautiful girl".

== Legend ==
According to the Padma Purana, Ashokasundari’s origin began when Parvati requested Shiva to take her to the most beautiful garden in creation. Shiva escorted her to Nandanvana, the celestial forest housing the legendary Kalpavriksha. Because her son, Kartikeya, had grown up and permanently departed Mount Kailash, Parvati was enduring immense maternal grief and loneliness. Seeking comfort, she wished for a daughter from the sacred, wish-fulfilling tree, which instantly granted her prayer and brought Ashokasundari into existence. Parvati subsequently prophesied that her daughter would marry Nahusha of the Lunar Dynasty—a ruler destined to equal Indra, the king of heaven.

While wandering through Nandanvana with her attendants one day, Ashokasundari caught the attention of a powerful rakshasa (demon) named Hunda, who immediately became infatuated with her. The goddess firmly rejected his advances, informing him of her divine destiny to marry Nahusha. Undeterred, Hunda disguised himself as a grieving widow claiming to have lost her husband to a demon, and enticed Ashokasundari to accompany him to a nearby hermitage. Upon arriving at his palace, the goddess uncovered his treachery. Infuriated, she cursed Hunda to meet his ultimate demise at the hands of Nahusha before escaping back to Mount Kailash.

In retaliation, Hunda abducted the infant Nahusha from his royal palace. However, a compassionate maid rescued the baby and placed him under the protective care of Sage Vashistha. As Nahusha grew into manhood, he learned of his destiny to vanquish the demon. Meanwhile, Hunda abducted Ashokasundari once more, falsely claiming he had slain Nahusha. Comforted by a Kinnara couple who reassured her of Nahusha's safety, Ashokasundari maintained her hope; the couple also prophesied that she would bear a mighty son named Yayati and a hundred beautiful daughters. Ultimately, Nahusha confronted Hunda in a fierce battle, defeated the demon, and rescued Ashokasundari, whom he wed. In time, during a period when Indra went missing, Nahusha was temporarily elevated to serve as the regent of heaven.

== In popular culture ==
Ashokasundari does not appear in any significant Hindu scriptures, barring in the Padma Purana. Her appearance in the television series Devon Ke Dev...Mahadev, on the life of Shiva brought her to the notice of many. She has been portrayed by:

- Ahsaas Channa and Ashnoor Kaur in Devon Ke Dev...Mahadev.
- Zeel Thakkar in Vighnaharta Ganesh.
- Muskan Kalyani in Shiv Shakti – Tap Tyaag Tandav.

== Bibliography ==
- Mani, Vettam (1975). Puranic Encyclopaedia: a Comprehensive Dictionary with Special Reference to the Epic and Puranic Literature. Motilal Banarsidass Publishers. ISBN 978-0-8426-0822-0.
