= Shibi (king) =

King in Hindu texts

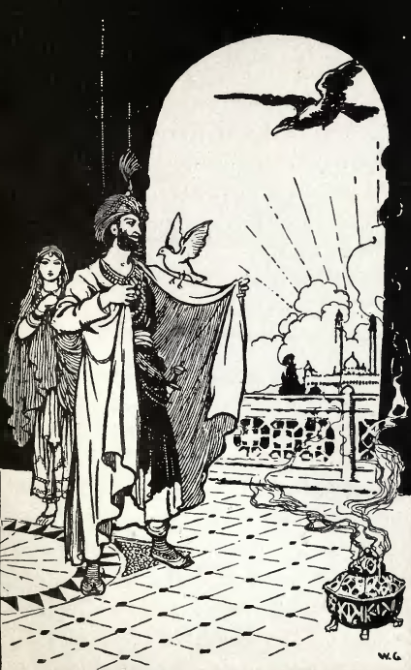
- An illustration of Shibi with the dove and the kite, c. 1916
- Texts: Mahabharata

Genealogy
- Parents: Ushinara (father); Madhavi (mother)
- Children: Kapotaroma
- Dynasty: Chandravamshi

Shibi (Sanskrit: शिबि, romanized: Śibi) is a king featured in Hindu texts. He is described to be the son of Ushinara of the Chandravamshi (Lunar dynasty). In one of his legends, he is said to have rescued Agni (transformed into a dove) from Indra (transformed into a kite) by offering up his flesh. He is a great king of kindness.

== Legend ==
=== Encounter with Suhotra ===
The Mahabharata states that a king of Kuru lineage named Suhotra once visited the great rishis. While returning, he came across Shibi. The two kings saluted each other, seated in their chariots, but refused to give way to the other, regarding themselves superior. The sage Narada encountered the two kings, and after hearing about the impasse, preached about the nuances of honesty and humility to both of them. He proclaimed that while Shibi was superior in virtue to Suhotra, both men were large-hearted, and one must surely give way to the other. Following this, Suhotra praised the achievements of Shibi and opted to give way to the latter.

=== Offering of flesh ===
The devas once decided to test the reputation of Shibi. Agni, assuming the form of a dove, sought refuge in the lap of the king, seeking protection from a pursuing kite. The king's priest told him that it was his sworn duty to protect the life of the dove, which told him that it was really a sage. Indra, assuming the form of a kite, flew into the scene, asking Shibi to offer him the dove that it had been chasing. Shibi refused to give up the dove that had sought his aid and countered that he would be willing to offer some other flesh as a substitute. According to the legend, the kite (Indra) instructed King Shibi that the flesh he would need to offer to save Agni, who had transformed into a dove, must be cut from his right thigh and be of equal weight to that of the dove. Shibi started to offer pieces of his flesh and placed them on a scale against the dove, but found that the bird weighed more than all the flesh he sacrificed. Finally, the king himself sat upon the scale. The deities assumed their original forms and hailed him, telling him that he would be blessed with a son named Kapotaroma.

== In popular culture ==
Sehwan in Pakistan, earlier known as Shibistan, is said to be named after Shibi. It was established by Raja Dahir and was usurped by Mohammad Bin Qasim in the 8th century CE. Sehwan is popular for its shrine Sehwan Sharif.

The Pundarikakshan Perumal Temple is said to have been built first by the monarch, according to its sthala purana.

Ajanta cave has depictions of the story of King Shibi.

Mogao cave has paintings of the story of King Shibi.

- Nahusha
- Ambarisha
- Rantideva
