= Yadu (legendary king) =

King in Hinduism

- Successor: Sahasrajit
- Texts: Ramayana, Mahabharata, Puranas
- Region: Hastinapura

Genealogy
- Parents: Yayati (father); Devayani (mother)
- Siblings: Turvasu (brother); Puru, Druhyu, and Anu (step-brothers)
- Children: Sahasrajit, Krosta, Nala, and Ripu
- Dynasty: Yaduvamsha

Yadu (Sanskrit: यदु, romanized: Yadu) is the founder of the Yadu dynasty in Hinduism. He is described to be the eldest son of King Yayati, and his queen, Devayani. He married five daughters of Nāga king.

== Legend ==
According to a narrative found in the Mahabharata, and the Vishnu Purana, Yadu refused to exchange his years of youth with his father, Yayati, when the latter was cursed with senility by his father-in-law, Shukra. Thus, he was cursed by Yayati to have his progeny disinherited of the dominion. Due to this proclamation, Yadu was replaced by his half-brother, Puru, as the heir to the throne of the Chandravamsha dynasty. Yadu founded his own cadet branch of the dynasty, called the Yaduvamsha.

== Descendants ==
The Agni Purana states that Yadu's lineage was continued by his eldest son, Sahasrajit. Sahasrajit had three sons: Haihaya, Renuhaya, and Haya.

A historical dynasty called the Traikutaka claimed descent from Haihaya.

According to Historian T Padmaja, the Abhiras migrated to Tamil Nadu and established their kingdoms and some of the inscriptions there mentions their descendant from the Yadu lineage.

== See also ==
- Raghu
- Ikshvaku
- Bharata
- Krishna
- Rama
