= Nahusha =

King in Hindu tradition

- King of the Lunar dynasty
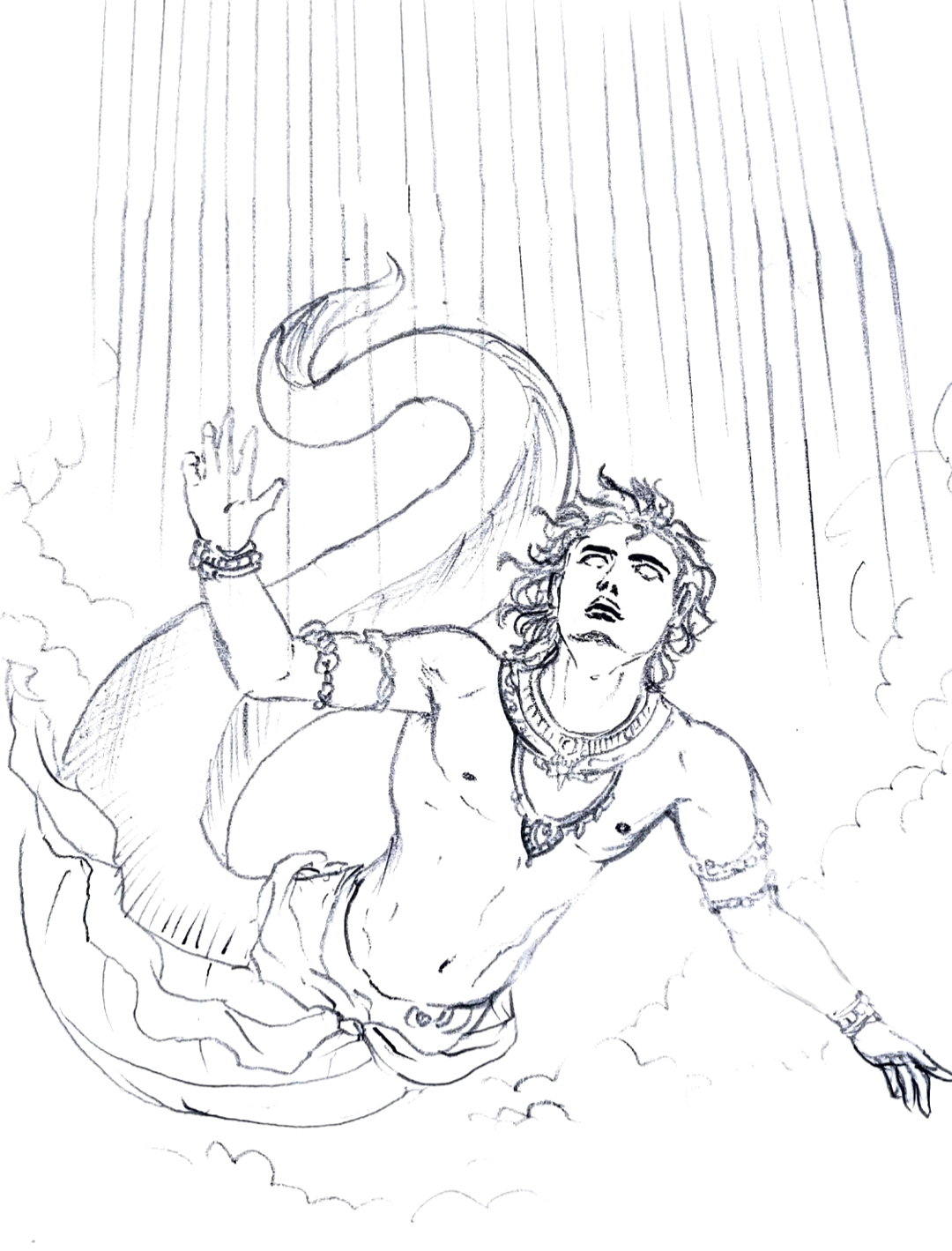
- A sketch of Nahusha's fall from heaven and transformation into a serpent
- Predecessor: Ayus
- Successor: Yayati
- Abode: Svarga
- Texts: Mahabharata, Harivamsa, Padma Purana

Genealogy
- Parents: Indumati (mother); Ayus (father)
- Spouse: Priyavasas or Viraja (according to the Mahabharata, Harivamsa and Vayu Purana) Ashokasundari (according to Padma Purana)
- Children: Yati, Yayati, Samyati, Ayati, Viyati, and Kriti (sons)
- Dynasty: Chandravamsha

Nahusha (Sanskrit: नहुष, IAST: Nahuṣa) is a king of the Chandravamsha (Lunar dynasty) in Hindu Puranas and Mahabharata. He is described to be the son of Āyus, the eldest son of Pururavas, and Prabha, the daughter of Svarbhānu.

== Literature ==
Nahusha is mentioned often in the Rigveda, starting in Mandala 1. Nahusha reigned from Pratishthana. The Mahabharata mentions Priyavasas as Nahusha's wife and the mother of this sons. According to the Harivamsha, the appendix of the epic Mahabharata, and the Vayu Purana, Nahusha married Viraja, also called Susvaha, the mind-born daughter of the Pitrs. They had six or seven sons, according to different scriptures. His eldest son Yati became a muni (ascetic). He was succeeded by his second son, Yayati.

According to the Padma Purana, Nahusha married Ashokasundari, she is said to have given birth to Yayati and a hundred daughters of Nahusha.

== Legend ==
=== Birth and early life ===
According to the Padma Purana, Ashoksundari would marry the son of Ayu. Once, when the asura Hunda entered the grove, he desired Ashoksundari, but the latter informed him of her mother's prophecy. Hunda assumed the form of a beautiful damsel, and tricked Ashokasundari into coming to his palace, whereupon he attempted to violate her chastity. Escaping, Ashokasundari cursed Hunda that the son of Ayu would kill him, after which she began to perform severe penance.

Meanwhile, Pururavas, the ancestor of the Chandravamsha dynasty, ruled over the kingdom of Prayaga, with Pratishthana as his capital. After he retired and gave up his kingdom to his son and ascended to heaven, his eldest son Āyu became the king. Āyu was married to Prabha, the daughter of the asura, Rahu. However, he remained childless.

Āyu approached the seer Dattatreya, and after propitiating him, he requested the sage to grant him a son who would be invincible and possess many virtuous qualities which are required for a great king. The sage obliged and a son was born to Āyu. Hunda was just waiting for the birth of Ayu's son because he was scared that Ashoksundari's curse would come true. So, the infant was kidnapped by the asura Hunda and he ordered his minions to slay the child. However, the minions only abandoned the child at the hermitage of Sage Vashistha. Vashistha took the child and named him Nahusha "the fearless one". Nahusha grew into a youth, a disciple of Vashistha. Eventually, Vashistha revealed Nahusha's true parentage. Nahusha acquired weapons from the gods and killed Hunda in battle and returned to his parents. He then married Ashoksundari.

=== Ruling Svarga ===
Nahusha was made the ruler of Svarga during Indra's absence, during his war against Vritra. He soon became arrogant and wished to make Shachi, the wife of Indra, his wife. He made the Saptarishi (Seven Vedic sages) convey his palanquin towards the mansion of Indra's wife with the intent of seducing her, asking them to hasten, telling them, 'sarpa', 'sarpa', (move on, move on). The sage Agastya, furious by this disrespect, turned him into a 'sarpa' (serpent). He fell down from the sky, and remained there until he met Yudhishthira.

In the Dvapara Yuga, when the Pandavas were on their exile after losing the game of dice, Nahusha in his serpent form captures Bhima and decides to eat him. Despite Bhima's extraordinary strength, Nahusha is too powerful, as he had received a boon while falling, from Agastya, that taken by him, strong beings superior to him, shall immediately lose their strength.

Meanwhile, Yudhishthira was looking for Bhima. He found him and saw what was happening to him. Nahusha reveals himself to be Yudhishthira's ancestor and tells him of his curse. Yudhishthira and Nahusha discourse with each other on their views of dharma. Nahusha tells Yudhishthira of his mistakes and asks him to learn from them. Nahusha is relieved from his curse and goes to heaven. Bhima then receives his strength.

Nahusha also finds mention in the story, "The Worth of Kine" by Sister Nivedita, in relation to the great sage Bharadvaja who was accidentally caught in a net along with fish by fishermen who were fishing in a river. The fishermen took the rishi Chyavana to King Nahusha and asked him to pay the price for the fish and the rishi, with the king offering a cow in return for the sage.
