= Vishnu Sakharam Khandekar =

Indian writer (1898-1976)

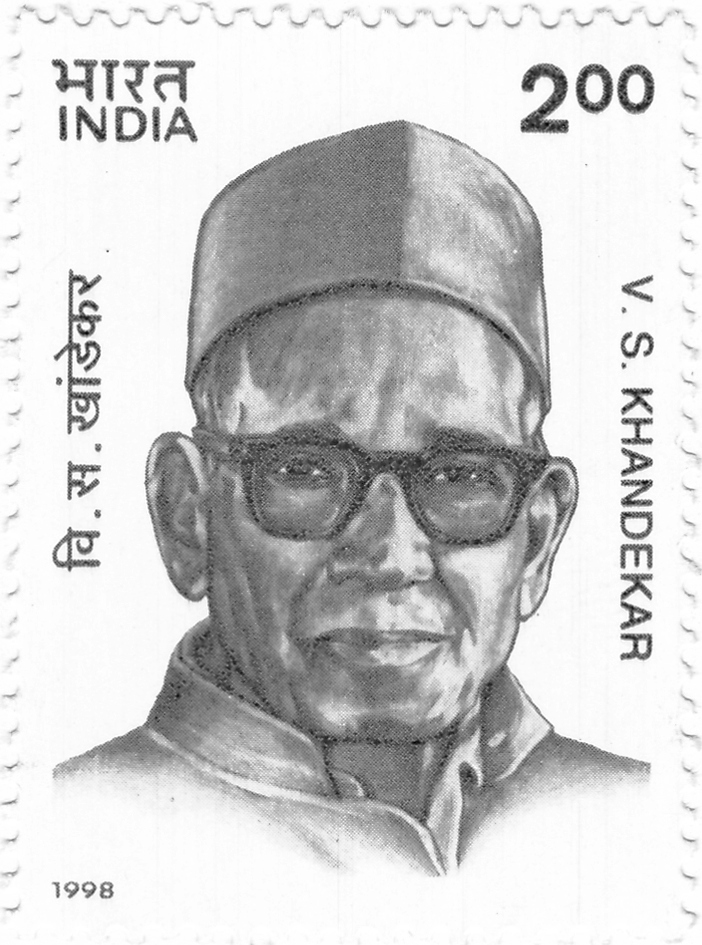
- V. S. Khandekar on a 1998 Stamp of India
- Born: 11 January 1898; Sangli, Bombay Presidency, British India
- Died: 2 September 1976 (aged 78); Miraj, Maharashtra, India • India (1947 - 1976)
- Occupation: Writer
- Writing career
- Notable works: Yayati, Kraunchwadh, Ulka
- Notable awards: Padma Bhushan (1968); Sahitya Akademi Fellowship (1970); Jnanpith Award (1974)

Vishnu Sakharam Khandekar (11 January 1898 – 2 September 1976) was a Marathi writer from Maharashtra, India. He was the first Marathi author to win the prestigious Jnanpith Award.

== Early life ==
Khandekar was born on 11 January 1898 in Sangli, Maharashtra. His father was a munsif (a subordinate official) in Sangli principality where he spent his childhood and completed his early education. In his early life, he was interested in acting in movies and staged various dramas during school days.

After passing his matriculation exam in 1913, Khandekar joined Fergusson College, Pune. In 1920, he started working as a school teacher at a school in Shiroda

== Professional and literary life ==
Khandekar's writing career began in 1919 when Shrimat Kalipuranam, his first work, was published, and continued to 1974 when his novel Yayati was published.

In 1920, Khandekar started working as a school teacher in a small town, Shiroda, in the present-day Sindhudurg district of the Konkan region in Maharashtra. He worked in that school until 1938. While working as a teacher, Khandekar produced in his spare time abundant Marathi literature in various forms. He frequented a hillock located overseeing the sea where he wrote many of his literary works, this place later came to be known by locals as "Khandekaranchi Khurchi" (Chair of Khandekar). In his lifetime, he wrote sixteen novels, six plays, around 250 short stories, 50 allegorical stories, 100 essays, and over 200 critiques. He worked and founded Khandekari alankar in Marathi grammar.

== Honors and awards ==
In 1941, Khandekar was elected as the president of the annual Marathi Sahitya Sammelan (Marathi Literary Conference) in Solapur. In 1968, the Government of India honoured him with a Padma Bhushan award in recognition of his literary accomplishments. Two years later, he was also honoured with the Sahitya Akademi Fellowship of the Indian Sahitya Akademi. in 1974, he was awarded Jnanpith Award, country's highest literary recognition, for his novel Yayati. Shivaji University at Kolhapur, Maharashtra conferred on him an honorary degree of D.Litt. In 1998, the Government of India issued a commemorative postage stamp in his honour.

== Major works ==
Khandekar's novel Yayāti (ययाति) received three prestigious awards: A Maharashtra State Award (1960), a Sahitya Akademi Award (1960), and a Jnanpith Award (1974).

Khandekar's other novels are as follows:

- Hrudayāchi Hāk (हृदयाची हाक) (1930)
- Kānchan Mruga (कांचनमृग) (1931)
- Ulkā (उल्का) (1934)
- Don Mane (दोन मने) (1938)
- Hirwā Chāphā (हिरवा चाफ़ा) (1938)
- Don Dhruwa (दोन धृव) (1934)
- Rikāmā Dewhārā (रिकामा देव्हारा) (1939)
- Pahile Prem (पहिले प्रेम) (1940)
- Kraunchawadh (क्रौंचवध) (1942)
- Jalalelā Mohar (जळलेला मोहर) (1947)
- Pāndhare Dhag (पांढरे ढग) (1949)
- Amrutawel (अमृतवेल)
- Sukhāchā Shodh (सुखाचा शोध)
- Ashru (अश्रू))
- Soneri Swapne Bhangaleli (सोनेरी स्वप्ने भंगलेली)
- Yayati (ययाति)
- Eka Panachi Kahani (एका पानाची कहाणी) (Autobiography)

== Other works ==
The following is a partial list of Khandekar's other works:

- अभिषेक(Abhishek)
- अविनाश (Avinash)
- गोकर्णीची फुले (Gokarnichi Fule)
- ढगाआडचे चांदणे (Dhagaadache Chandne)
- दवबिंदू (Davabindu)
- नवी स्त्री (Navi Stree)
- प्रसाद (Prasad)
- मुखवटे (Mukhawate)
- रानफुले (Ranfule)
- विकसन (Vikasan)
- क्षितिजस्पर्श (Kshitijsparsh)

== Movies and television serials ==
Several movies and television serials have been made based on the works of Khandekar. The movies include:

- Chhāyā...........[Marathi] (1936)
- Jwālā..............[Marathi and Hindi] (1938)
- Devatā............[Marathi] (1939)
- Amrit..............[Marathi and Hindi] (1941)
- Dharma Patni...[Telugu and Tamil] (1941)
- Pardeshi.........[Marathi]) (1953)

Khandekar wrote the dialogue and screenplay for the Marathi movie Lagna Pahāwe Karoon (1940).

== Other works ==
- Khandekar, Vishnu Sakharam; A. K. Bhagwat; Acyuta Kesava Bhagavata (1977). Maharashtra, a Profile. V. S. Khandekar Amrit Mahotsava Satkar Samiti.

== Bibliography ==
- Yayati (Marathi). 1959. OCLC 489363076.

== Works in translation ==
- Yayati by V. S. Khandekar (English), Tr. by Y. P. Kulkarni. Orient Paperbacks. ISBN 978-81-222-0428-5.

== See also ==
- List of Indian writers
