= Sharmishtha =

Princess in Hindu texts

- Affiliation: Daitya
- Texts: Mahabharata, Matsya Purana

Genealogy
- Parents: Vrishaparvan (father)
- Consort: Yayati
- Children: Druhyu, Anudruhyu, Puru
- Dynasty: Chandravamsha (by marriage)

Sharmishtha (Sanskrit: शर्मिष्ठा, romanized: Śarmiṣṭhā) is a princess appearing in Hindu scriptures. She is described to be the daughter of the daitya king Vrishaparvan. She becomes the second wife of Yayati, due to which she becomes an ancestor of the Pandavas and the Kauravas.

She is featured as a friend of Devayani, for whom she later becomes a servant. Her story is told by Vaisampayana in the Adi Parva of the Mahabharata.

== Legend ==
=== Quarrel ===
Sharmishtha is the daughter of Vrishaparvan, the daitya king, for whom the acharya Shukra is an adviser. She is a friend of Devayani, the daughter of Shukra. One day, the two go for a bath in a brook in a forest, accompanied by their retinue of maids, leaving their clothes on the bank of the stream. While they bathe, Indra manifests himself as a wind, blowing their garments off the banks. In their hurry to retrieve their clothes, the two women donned each other's clothes. A quarrel ensues between the friends, and insults are exchanged regarding each other's fathers. In the ensuing quarrel, Sharmishtha and her maids throw Devayani into a well, leaving her for dead. Devayani is rescued by Yayati, a king of the Chandravamsha dynasty.

Devayani, still angered by Sharmistha's assassination attempt in the forest, is bent on revenge. She tells her father that she would not go back to the capital until Sharmishtha serves as her handmaiden for the rest of her life. Shukracharya also leaves the capital to stay with his dearest daughter. Seeing the plight of her father, King Vrishaparvan, Sharmishtha sacrifices her royal status, and agrees to take up the role of a handmaiden to Devayani, to protect her kingdom's interests. Devayani comes back to the capital along with her father, and enjoys the servitude of Sharmishtha.

=== Affair ===
After a period of time, Devayani returns to the same forest, along with Sharmishtha and her other servants. Yayati comes to the spot for hunting, and they meet again. The king and the Brahmana's daughter fall in love, and so the former asks for Devayani's hand from Shukra, as was custom. Shukra offers his consent readily, but warns Yayati that he is not to have nuptial relations with Sharmishtha. Yayati marries Devayani, and looks after her well in his palace.

The king erects a mansion specifically for the erstwhile princess, near the artificial woods called the Aśokavanikā, tending to her every need, but remaining faithful to Devayani. After Devayani bears her first child, Sharmishtha comes across the king at the Aśokavanikā, and solicits an affair with him. While Yayati admits that he finds the princess beautiful, he refuses, stating that he had promised not to lay with her to Shukra. Sharmishtha attempts to persuade him to sleep with her. She appeals to his position as a monarch, stating that it is duty to fulfil the desires of his subjects, as well as reasoning that as Devayani's servant, she held no identity, and since Devayani belonged to him, she belonged to him as well:

'O monarch, one may look upon her friend’s husband as her own. One’s friend’s marriage is the same as one’s own. You have been chosen by my friend as her husband. You are as much my husband, therefore.'

— Mahabharata, Sambhava Parva, Section LXXXII

Convinced by the princess, Yayati sleeps with her, and in due course, she birth to three sons: Druhyu, Anudruhyu, and Puru.

Once, Yayati and Devayani chance upon Sharmishtha's children in a garden, and the children reveal their mother's identity. Furious, Devayani storms off to the realm of the asuras, informing her father of Yayati's affair. Shukra curses Yayati to suffer the infirmities of old age in his youth. When the king begs him to release him from the curse, Shukra relents, stating that it could be lifted if one of his sons agreed to suffer the curse in his place, offering the king his youthfulness. Only Puru accepts to bear the burden of the curse among all the king's issue, and so he is designated as Yayati's heir. After enjoying his sensuous youth for a thousand years, Yayati accepts the curse back from Puru, leaving the latter to reign as king. Puru becomes the ancestor of the eponymous cadet-branch of the Chandravamsha called the Pauravas, whose successors would eventually give rise to the Kuruvamsha, the dynasty of the Pandavas and the Kauravas.
