= Devayani =

Mahabharata character

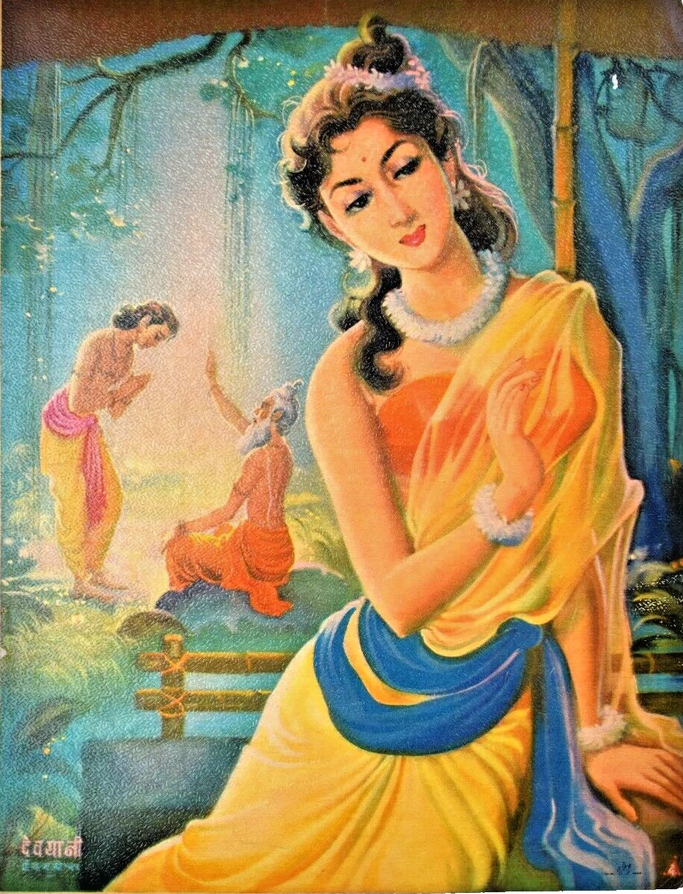
- 20th-century lithograph depicting Devayani, along with Shukra and Kacha in the background
- Texts: Mahabharata

Genealogy
- Parents: Shukracharya (father); Jayanti (mother)
- Consort: Yayati
- Children: Yadu, Turvasu
- Dynasty: Chandravamsha (by marriage)

Devayani (Sanskrit: देवयानी, romanized: Devayānī) is a character in Hindu literature. She is described to be the daughter of Shukra, the acharya (preceptor) of the asuras. She marries King Yayati, and gives birth to two sons — Yadu and Turvasu.

== Legend ==
=== Infatuation with Kacha ===
Kacha is described to be the handsome son of Brihaspati. He is sent by the devas to Shukra's ashrama (spiritual hermitage) to learn about the Mṛtasañjīvanī vidyā mantra, the knowledge that allows one to restore life after death. Shukra accepts him as his student, and the latter accepts the task of offering him a thousand years of service. Devayani is infatuated by the youth, and the two become an inseparable couple. The asuras, however, are suspicious of Kacha's intentions, guessing correctly that he wished to know the secret of the life-restoring mantra. They murder him on two different occasions: They kill him when he is deep within the forest and feed him to the wolves, and pound his body to paste, mixing it with seawater. On both occasions, upon the insistent pleas of his daughter, Kacha is restored to life with the knowledge of the Sañjīvanī by Shukra. In their third attempt, the asuras burn the body of Kacha, mix it with ashes and wine, offer it to Shukra to drink. When dusk falls, and Shukra observes that his disciple has not yet arrived, he deduces that the latter is in his belly. Finding himself in a dilemma, the acharya teaches Kacha the Mṛtasañjīvanī mantra, and when the disciple bursts out of Shukra's belly, killing him, he revives his acharya by chanting the mantra. His objective achieved, he stays under the tutelage of Shukra until his education is completed.

His tutelage complete, Kacha takes his leave from Devayani and her father, and starts to journey back to Devaloka. Devayani follows him for a long distance, and requests that he marry her. Kacha reveals to her that Shukra had told him that since he had emerged from the acharya's belly, he is deemed to be his son, and that made Devayani his sister. Furious at his rejection, Devayani curses him that he would be unable to employ the art of the life-reviving mantra himself. Kacha, in turn, curses her that none of the sons of sages would marry her. After the incident, they parted ways, and never met again.

=== Wife of Yayati ===
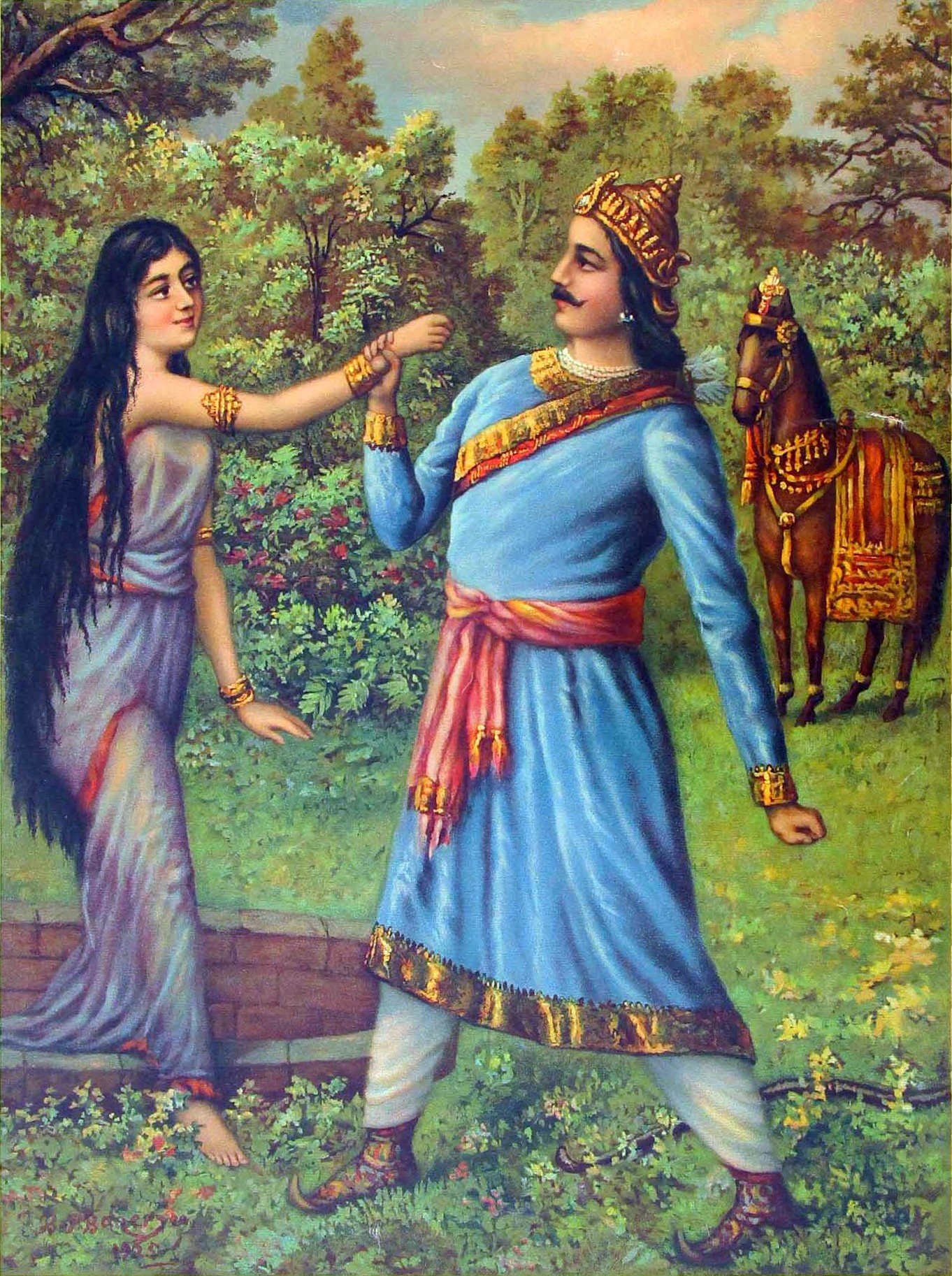
Devyani being rescued from the well by Yayati, lithograph by BP Banerjee

When Shukra serves as the counsellor of the daitya king Vrishaparvan, Devayani becomes a friend of Sharmishtha, a princess, and the daughter of the daitya king. One day, the two go for a bath in a forest brook, accompanied by their retinue of maids, leaving their clothes on the bank of the stream. While they bathe, Indra manifests himself as a wind, blowing their garments off the banks. In their hurry to retrieve their clothes, the two women don each other's saris. A quarrel ensues between the friends, and insults are exchanged regarding each other's fathers. In the ensuing quarrel, Sharmishtha and her maids throw Devayani into a well, leaving her for dead. Devayani is rescued by Yayati, a king of the Chandravamsha dynasty, who enquires regarding her identity, and returns to his kingdom. Devayani sends Ghurnika, her maid, to her father, conveying the news of her quarrel and dire circumstances. Shukra is furious with Vrishaparvan, and settles down in the forest with his daughter. When the daitya king begs for the acharya's forgiveness in person, Shukra demands that one thousand servants, along with Sharmishtha, are required to serve Devayani as an apology. Fearing the sage's wrath, the king concedes, and sends his daughter and one thousand women to serve Devayani in the forest.

After a period of time, Devayani returns to the same forest, along with Sharmishtha and her other servants. Yayati comes to the spot for hunting, and they meet again. The king and the Brahmana's daughter fall in love, and so the former asks for Devayani's hand from Shukra, as was custom. Shukra offers his consent readily, but warns Yayati that he is not to have nuptial relations with Sharmishtha. Yayati marries Devayani, and looks after her well in his palace.

Yayati sires two sons, Yadu and Turvasu, with Devayani. Unbeknownst to her, he secretly engages in an affair with Sharmishta as well, and has three sons by her: Druhyu, Anudruhyu, and Puru. When Devayani learns of her husband's infidelity, she leaves him, and returns to her father's place. Shukra curses his son-in-law with premature old age. However, upon hearing Yayati's pleas, he agrees to alter it so that Yayati could swap his old age with the youth of any of his young sons. Yayati swaps his youth with his fifth son, Puru. After a thousand years of enjoying his sensuous youth with his two wives, he receives the curse back from his son, and retires to the forest with Devayani and Sharmishtha.

== Notes ==
- Devayani and Kacha Retold by P. R. Ramachander
