= Puru (legendary king) =

King in Hindu tradition, son of Yayati, ancestor of the Pandavas and Kauravas

- King of the Lunar Dynasty
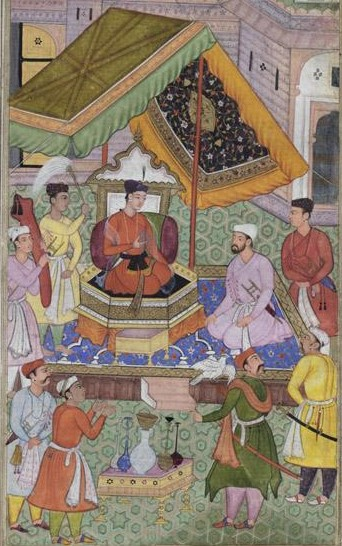
- Puru enthroned by his father Yayati (illustration from the Razmnama
- Predecessor: Yayati
- Successor: Janamejaya
- Texts: Mahabharata, Puranas

Genealogy
- Parents: Sharmishtha (mother); Yayati (father)
- Spouse: Kaushalya (Pauṣṭi)
- Children: Janamejaya
- Dynasty: Chandravamsha

Puru (Sanskrit: पूरु, romanized: Pūru) is a legendary king in Hinduism. He is the youngest son of King Yayati and Sharmishtha, and an ancestor of the Pandavas and the Kauravas. King Puru marries Kausalya, and is succeeded by his son, Janamejeya.

== Legend ==
=== Bhagavata Purana ===
In the nineteenth chapter of book nine of the Bhagavata Purana, Puru is described as having four brothers; Yadu, Turvasu, Druhyu, and Anu. He exchanges his youth for the old age of his father Yayati when the latter gets cursed by Shukracharya, allowing his father to enjoy his youth for a thousand years. Afterwards, Yayati takes back his curse and makes Puru his heir, though he is the youngest of them all. His successor is Práchinvat; his son is Pravíra; his son is Manasyu.

=== Mahabharata ===
In the Mahabharata's Adi Parva, he is said to have inherited his kingdom in the Gangetic plain. He is said to have three mighty heroes as sons by his wife Pauṣṭi; Pravīra, Īśvara, and Raudrāśva. Pravira succeeded Puru, and was in turn succeeded by his son, Manasyu.

Puru's dynasty becomes the Puruvamsha, which was later renamed as Kuruvamsha, to which the Pandavas and the Kauravas belong.

=== Rigveda ===
Another Puru is mentioned as a king in the Rigveda and as the father of Adityas, married to Aditi, living and ruling over an area of the Sarasvati river.

== See also ==
- Lunar Dynasty
- Yayati
- Pauravas
