= Lunar dynasty =

Mythological Hindu dynasty

Lunar Dynasty
- Capital: Mathura, Hastinapura
- Common languages: Sanskrit
- Religion: Hinduism
- Government: Monarchy
- Monarch

The Lunar dynasty (IAST: Candravaṃśa) is a lineage or dynasty which claims to be descended from Chandra or Soma (the Hindu lunar deity).

According to the Shatapatha Brahmana, Pururavas was the son of Budha (himself often described as the son of Soma) and the gender-switching deity Ila (born as the daughter of Manu). Pururavas's great-grandson was Yayati, who had five sons named Yadu, Turvasu, Druhyu, Anu, and Puru. These seem to be the names of five Vedic tribes as described in the Vedas.

According to the Mahabharata, Lunar dynasty's progenitor Ila ruled from Prayaga, and had a son Shashabindu who ruled in the country of Bahli. The son of Ila and Budha was Pururavas, who became the first Chandravamsha, emperor of all of the earth. Ila's descendants were also known as the Ailas.

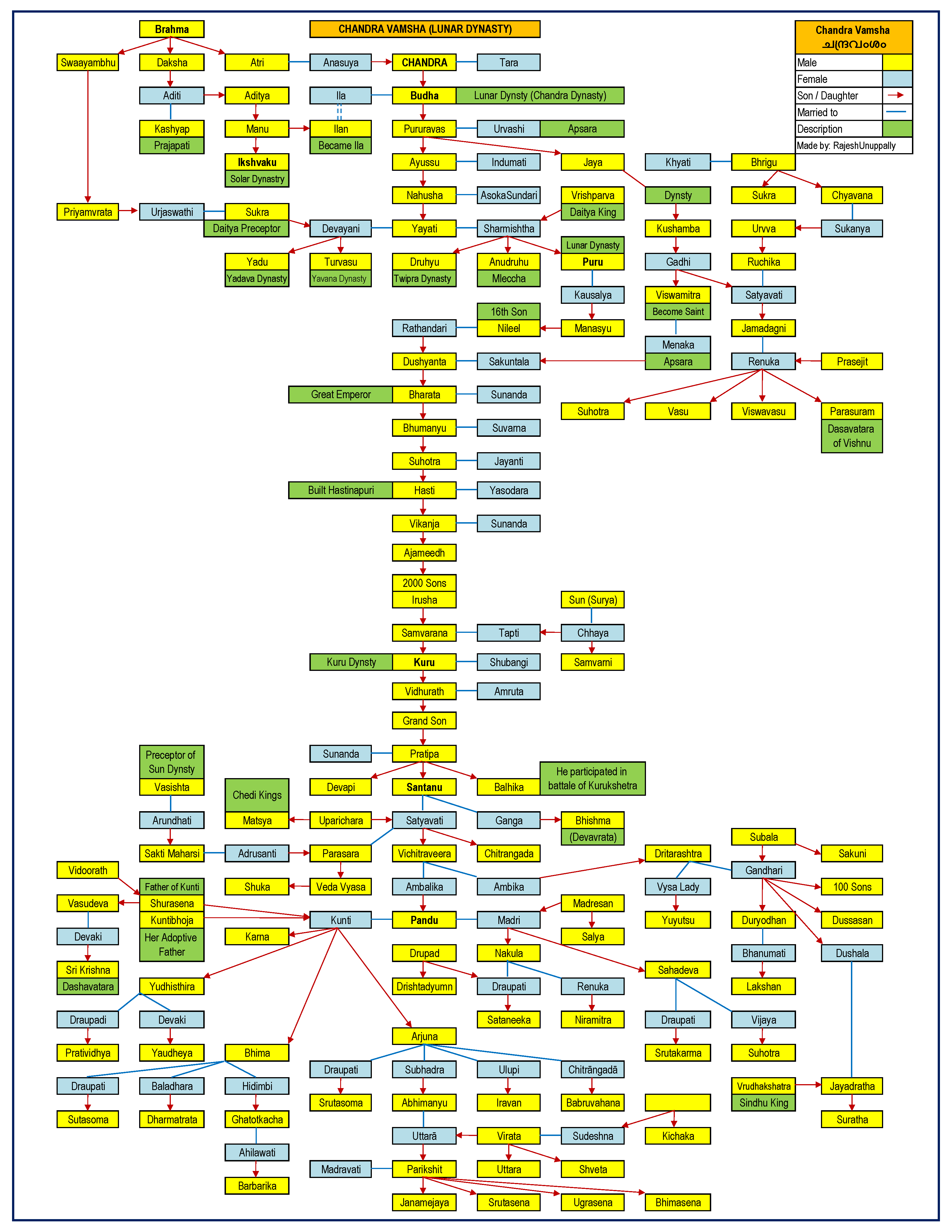
Chandravamsha family tree

== In Mahabharata ==
In Hindu texts, the Kurukshetra War, which forms the subject of the Indian epic Mahabharata, was largely fought between rival branches of the Lunar dynasty, famously resulting in Arjuna's turn away from war and the reprimand of his mentor Krishna. Krishna reminds Arjuna that dharma stands above everything, and the text forms an integral cultural cornerstone for all four Kshatriya houses.

By the conclusion of the Kurukshetra War, most of the Yaduvamsha lineage is in peril. The sinking of Dvārakā sees the destruction of the entire Yaduvamsha lineage, with the exception of Vajra, who was saved by Arjuna, and later becomes the King of Mathura.

== See also ==
- Solar dynasty
- Mahabharata
- History of Hinduism
- List of Puru and Yadu dynasties
- Chandra

== Sources ==
- Thapar, Romila (2013), The Past Before Us, Harvard University Press, ISBN 978-0-674-72651-2
