= Ambivli railway station =

Railway station in Thane district, Maharashtra, India

Ambivli
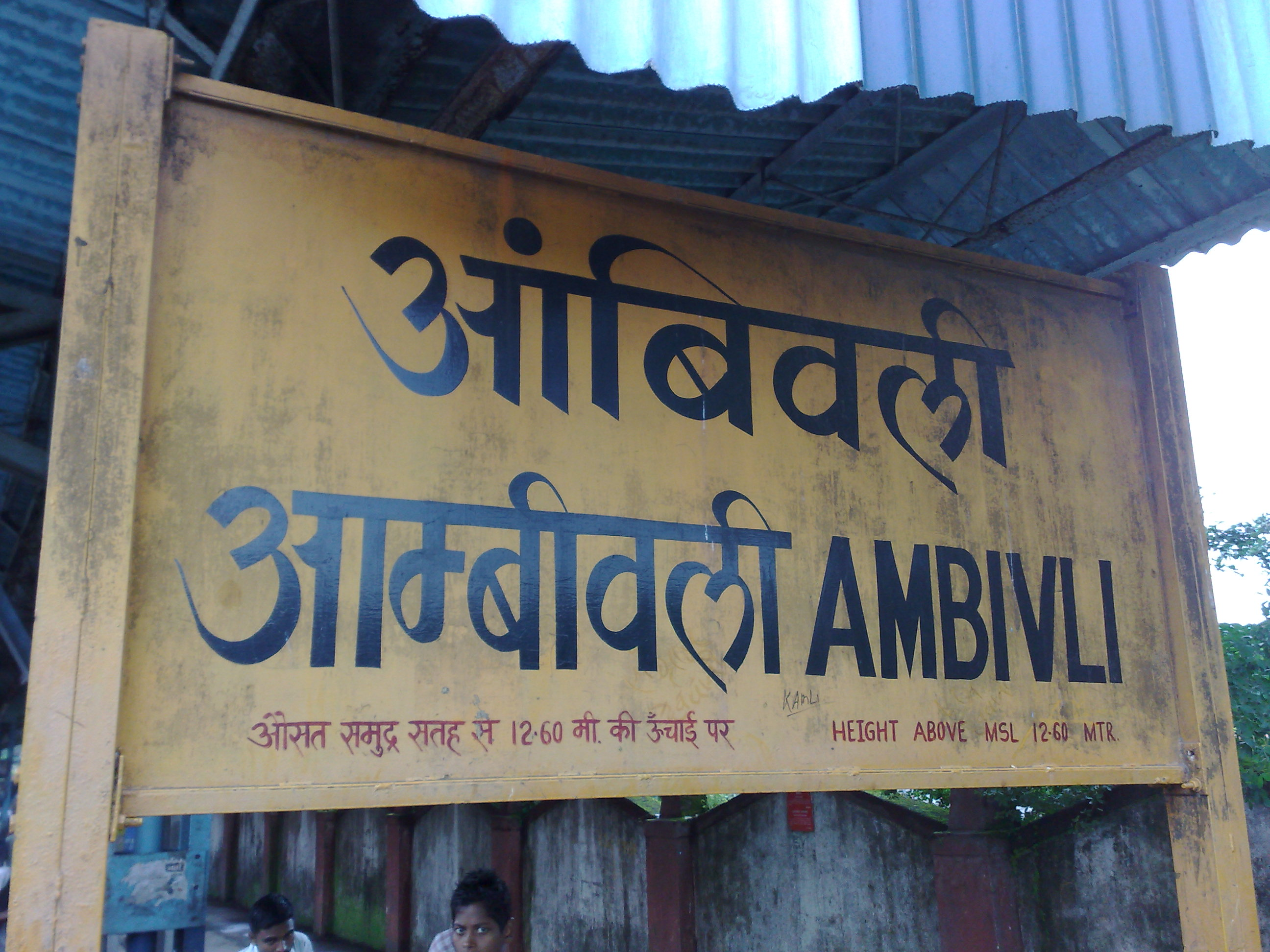

General information
- Coordinates: 19.265133°N 73.172373°E
- Elevation: 12.600 metres (41.34 ft)
- System: Indian Railways and Mumbai Suburban Railway station
- Owner: Ministry of Railways, Indian Railways
- Line: Central Line
- Platforms: 02
- Connections: Auto stand

Construction
- Structure type: Standard (on-ground station)
- Parking: Yes
- Cycle facilities: Yes

Other information
- Status: Active
- Station code: ABY
- Fare zone: Central Railways

Services
Preceding station	Mumbai Suburban Railway	Following station
Shahad towards Chhatrapati Shivaji Terminus	Central line	Titwala towards Kasara
Route map
Location
- Location within India Location within Maharashtra

Ambivli railway station (station code: ABY) is a railway station on the Central line of the Mumbai Suburban Railway network, in western India. It is located on the route between Kalyan and Kasara. Shahad is the previous stop and Titwala is the next stop.

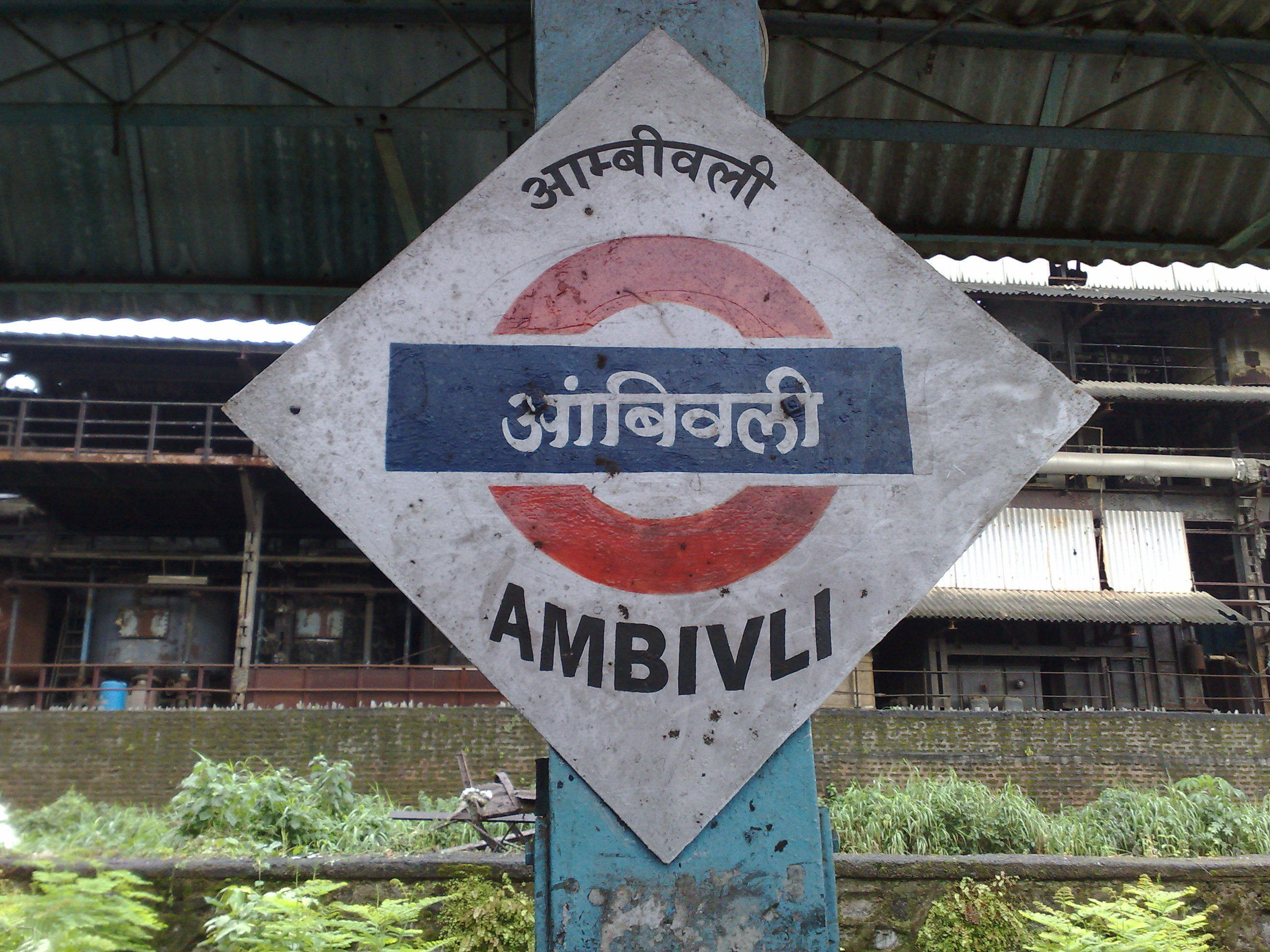
Ambivli railway station – platform board
