= Birla Mandir, Shahad =

Hindu temple in Shahad, Ulhasnagar taluka, Maharashtra

Birla Mandir
- Vithobha Rukmai Mandir
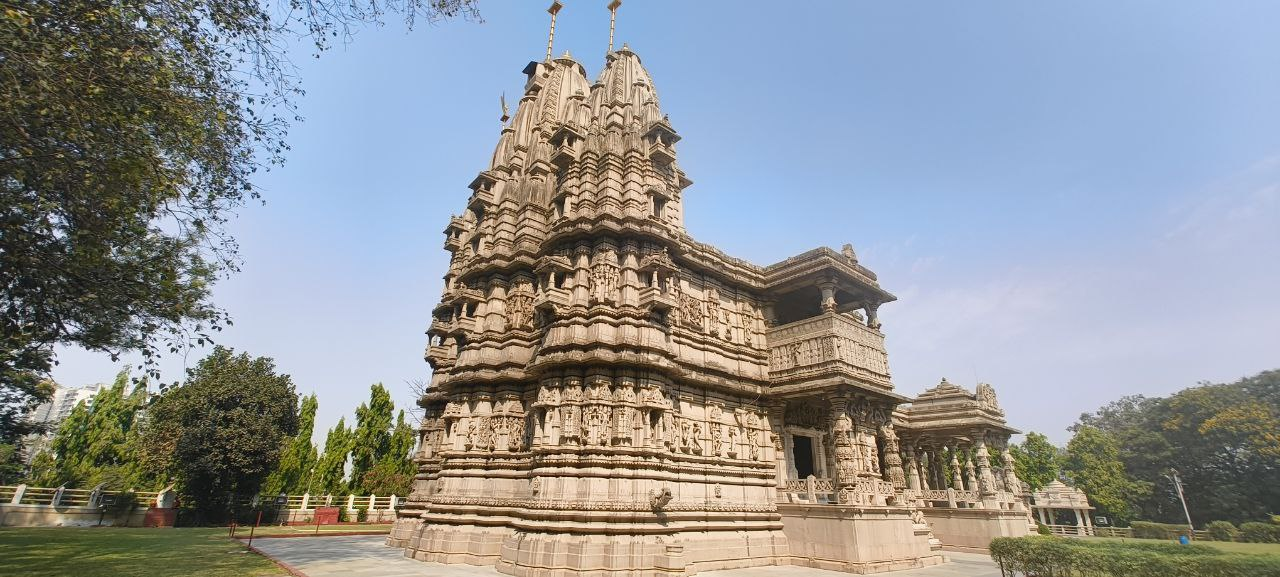

- Location within Maharashtra Location within India

Religion
- Affiliation: Hinduism
- District: Thane
- Deity: Vithoba-Rukmai
- Festivals: Ashadhi Ekadashi; Ekadashi
- Ecclesiastical or organizational status: Active

Location
- Location: Shahad
- State: Maharashtra
- Country: India
- Interactive map of Birla Mandir
- Coordinates: 19.244066°N 73.166368°E

Architecture
- Founder: Birla family

Specifications
- Direction of façade: North
- Temple: One
- Materials: Stone

Birla Mandir is a Hindu temple of Lord Vithoba in Shahad, Ulhasnagar taluka, Thane district, Maharashtra, India. It is famous for its scenery and architecture.

Bollywood films like Suhaag (1979), Tere Naam, Prem Granth, Golmaal: Fun Unlimited (2006), etc. has filmed at the temple. It is located in the vicinity of the Century Rayon Company on the NH-61 (Kalyan-Nanded Rd) at West side of Kalyan.

== Architecture ==
The temple is dedicated to Lord Pandurang and goddess Rukmani, popular deities in Maharashtra's varkari sampradaya. It is built by industrialist Birla family, they have built mandirs at many place dedicated to various Hindu gods. This temple is made up of stone and appears like an ancient temple, many idols have been carved on its interior and exterior walls, stone elephants are present at entrances.

== In popular culture ==
Amitabh Bachchan and Shashi Kapoor starrer 1979 release Suhaag's "Ye yaar sun" song has filmed at the temple.

== How to get there ==
Catch a train to Asangaon railway station(AN), Titwala railway station(TL) or Kasara railway station(N) from any station between Kalyan Junction railway station and Chhatrapati Shivaji Maharaj Terminus, and alight at Shahad railway station (Next to Kalyan Junction railway station). There are auto rickshaws available from Shahad (East) and Kalyan to Birla Mandir. Birla Mandir is very scenic & peaceful place which operates from 6:00 am to 9:00 pm. There is mini train for kids, in the adjacent Garden (Shivaji Udyan) which operates at 6:00 am to 11:30 am morning and 4:00 pm to 7:30 pm in evening.
