= Shahad railway station =

Railway Station in Maharashtra, India

Shahad
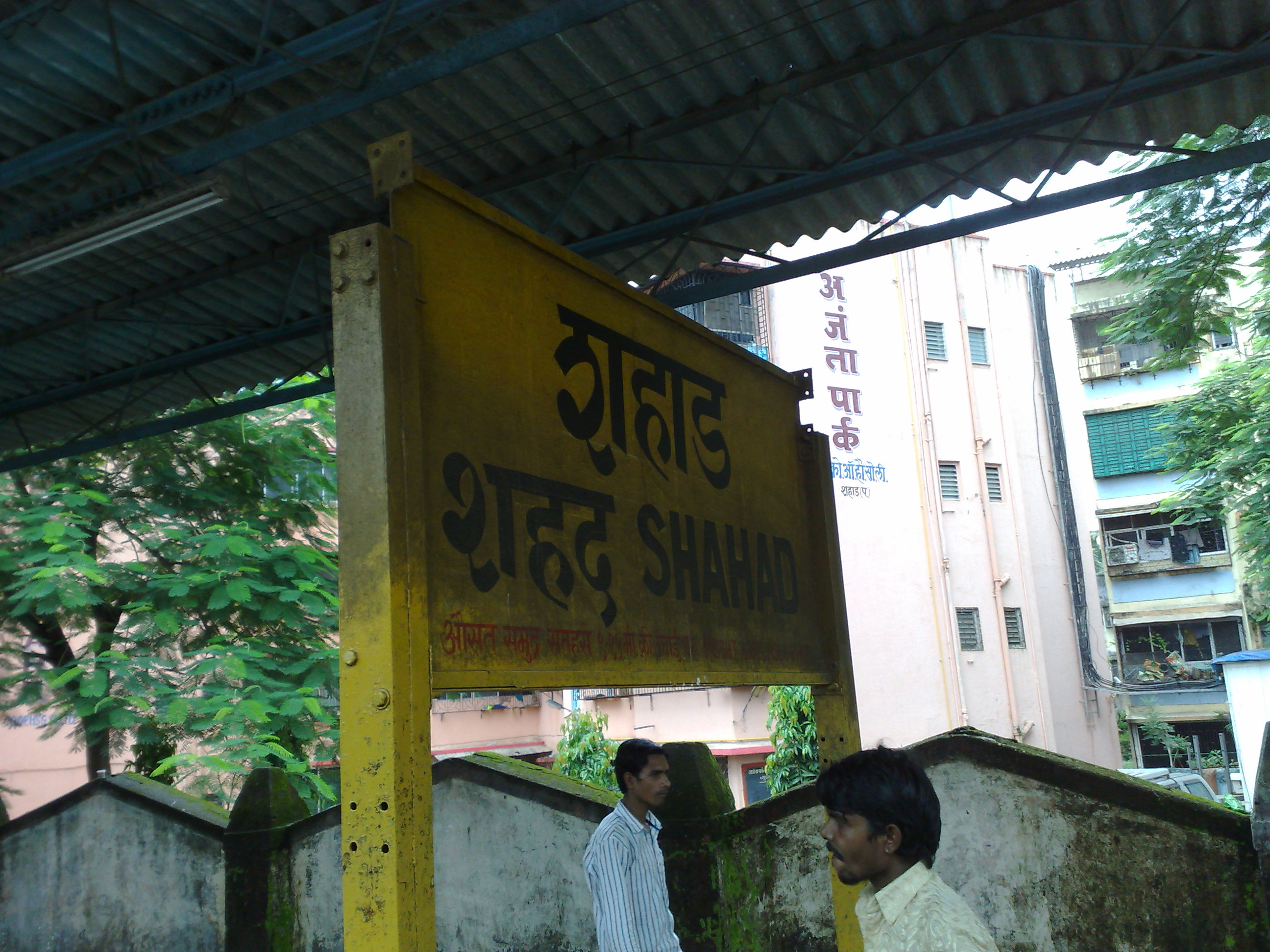

General information
- Coordinates: 19.243889°N 73.166389°E
- Elevation: 9.950 metres (32.64 ft)
- System: Indian Railways and Mumbai Suburban Railway station
- Owner: Ministry of Railways, Indian Railways
- Line: Central Line
- Platforms: 02
- Tracks: 02

Construction
- Structure type: Standard, on ground
- Parking: Yes

Other information
- Status: Active
- Station code: SHAD
- Fare zone: Central Railways

Services
| Preceding station | Mumbai Suburban Railway | Following station |
|---|---|---|
| Kalyan Junction towards Chhatrapati Shivaji Terminus | Central line | Ambivli towards Kasara |
Route map
Location
- Location within Maharashtra

Shahad (station code: SHAD) is a 2-platform railway station located in Maharashtra, on the Central line of the Mumbai Suburban Railway network, in western India. It is located on the route between Kalyan and Ambivli.

Shahad is located on the Kasara Line, next to Kalyan. The railway route that comes up to Kalyan from Mumbai CSMT bifurcates, where one route goes towards Ambarnath, Ulhasnagar, Badlapur, Karjat, and Pune. The other line goes towards Shahad, Titwala, Asangaon, Kasara, and Nashik. Shahad is located on the Nasik route, next station from Kalyan.

== Gallery ==
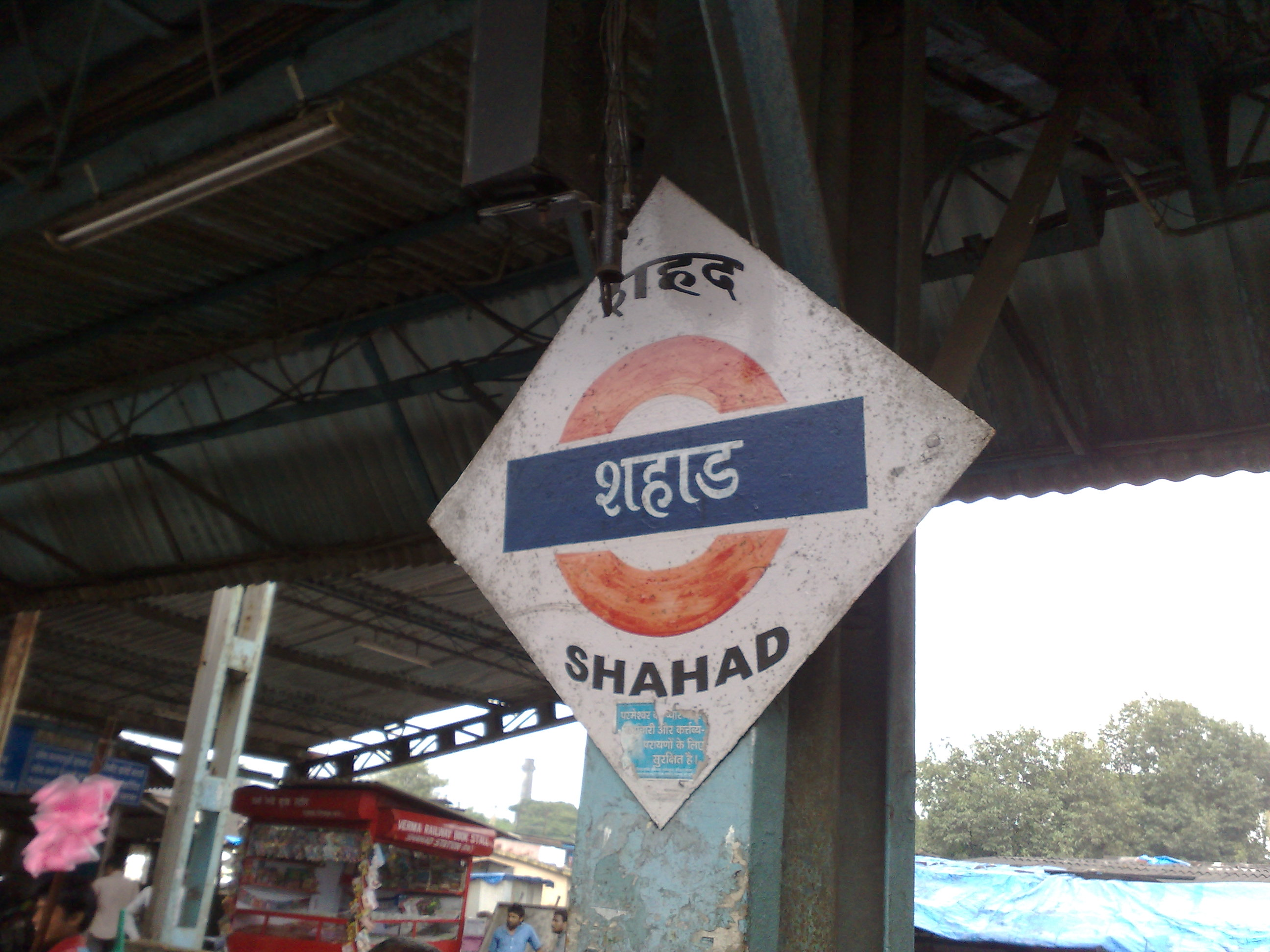
Shahad Railway Station - Platform Board.
