= Kalyan-Dombivli Municipal Corporation =

Local civic body in Kalyan-Dombivli, Maharashtra, India

Kalyan Dombivli Municipal Corporation (KDMC)
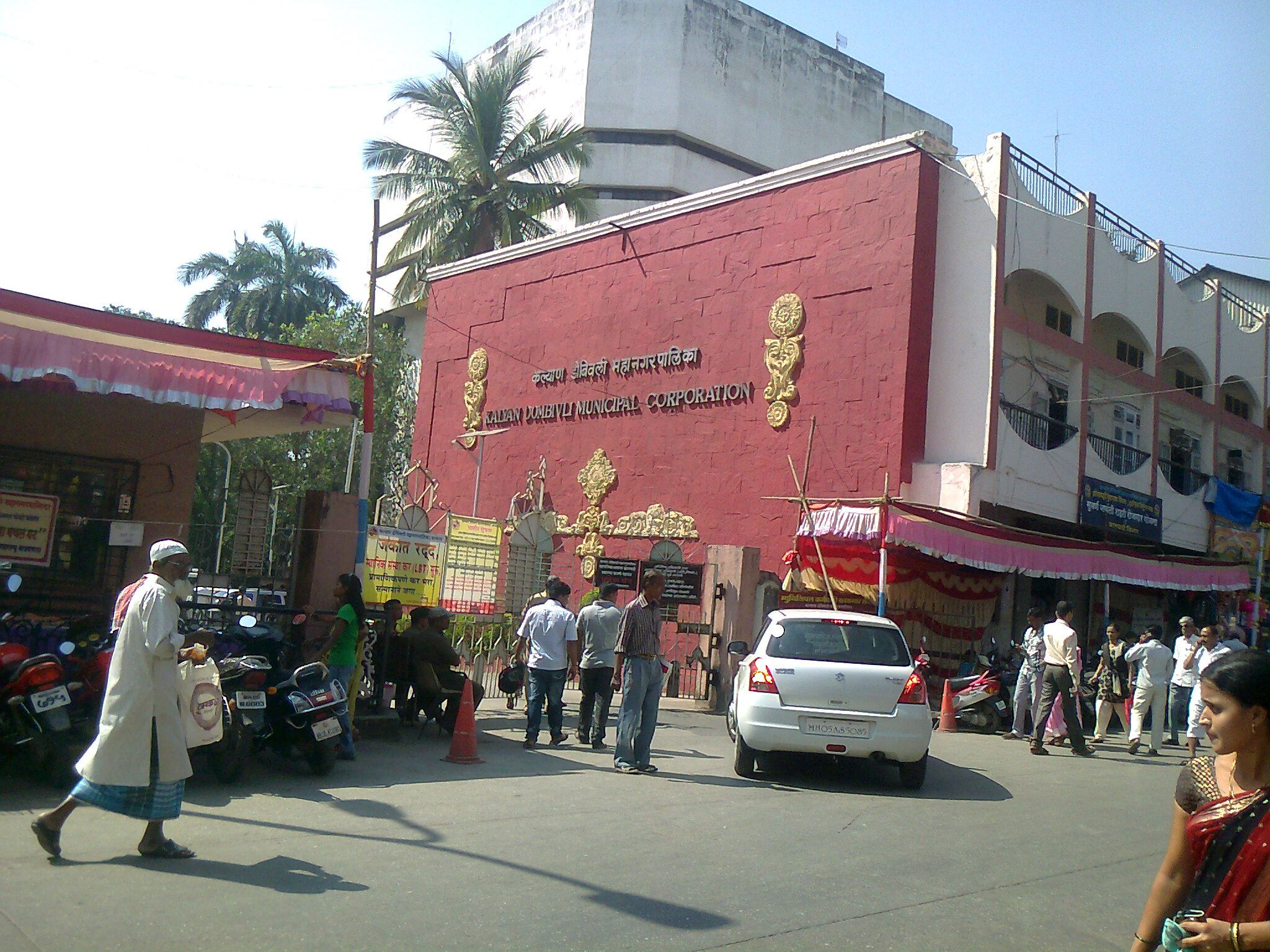

Type
- Type: Municipal Corporation of the Kalyan-Dombivli

Leadership
- Mayor: Harshali Chaudhari-Thavil, SHS
- Deputy Mayor: Rahul Damle, BJP
- Municipal commissioner & Administrator: Mr. Abhinav Goel (IAS)

Structure
- Seats: 122
- Political groups: Government(103): SHS (53); BJP (50); Opposition (19): SS(UBT) (11); MNS (5); INC (2); NCP-SP (1)

Elections
- Last election: 15 January 2026
- Next election: 2031

Website
- https://kdmc.gov.in

Kalyan-Dombivli Municipal Corporation (KDMC) is the governing body of the city of Kalyan-Dombivli, located in the Thane district of the Indian state of Maharashtra. The municipal corporation consists of elected members from each municipal ward of the city, knowns as councillors, and is headed by a mayor and in his/her absence, by a deputy mayor, elected from amongst the councillors. The municipal corporation administers the city's infrastructure, public services, and transport.

== Areas under Kalyan-Dombivli Municipal Corporation ==
1. Kalyan
2. Dombivli
3. Thakurli
4. Kopar
5. Shahad
6. Ambivli
7. Titwala
8. Vithalwadi

== Revenue sources ==
The following are the Income sources for the corporation from the Central and State Government.

=== Revenue from taxes ===
Following is the Tax related revenue for the corporation.

- Property tax.
- Profession tax.
- Entertainment tax.
- Grants from Central and State Government like Goods and Services Tax.
- Advertisement tax.

=== Revenue from non-tax sources ===
Following is the Non Tax related revenue for the corporation.

- Water usage charges.
- Fees from Documentation services.
- Rent received from municipal property.
- Funds from municipal bonds.

== List of Mayor ==
#	Name	Tenure			Election	Party
	Pundalik Mhatre	10 Nov 2005	7 May 2008		2005	Nationalist Congress Party
	Ramesh Jadhav	8 May 2008	11 November 2010	2 years, 187 days	2005	Shiv Sena
	Vaijayanti Gholap	12 November 2010	10 May 2013	2 years, 179 days	2010	Shiv Sena
	Kalyani Patil	11 May 2013	10 November 2015	2 years, 183 days	2010	Shiv Sena
	Rajendra Devlekar	11 November 2015	8 May 2018	2 years, 178 days	2015	Shiv Sena
	Vinita Rane	9 May 2018	10 November 2020	2 years, 185 days	2015	Shiv Sena
23	Harshali Chaudhari -Thavil	3 February 2026	Incumbent	172 days	2026	Shiv Sena (SHS)

== List of Deputy Mayor ==
#	Name	Tenure		Election
	Rahul Damle	2026	Incumbent	2026 (BJP)

== Election results 2026 ==
=== Political performance in Election 2026 ===
Party	Seats	+/-
Shiv Sena (SHS)	53	▲1
Bharatiya Janata Party (BJP)	50	▲8
Maharashtra Navnirman Sena (MNS)	5	▼4
Indian National Congress (INC)	2	▼2
Nationalist Congress Party (NCP)	1	▼1
Shiv Sena (UBT) (SS(UBT))	11	New
Others	0	▼7

== Electoral Performance in 2015 ==
=== Political performance in Election 2015 ===
Party	Seats	+/-
Shiv Sena (SS)	52	▲21
Bharatiya Janata Party (BJP)	42	▲33
Maharashtra Navnirman Sena (MNS)	9	▼16
Indian National Congress (INC)	4	▼11
Nationalist Congress Party (NCP)	2	▼13
All India Majlis-e-Ittehadul Muslimeen (AIMIM)	4	▲4
Bahujan Samaj Party (BSP)	1	▲1
Others	7	▼19

== Electoral Performance in 2010 ==
=== Political performance in Election 2010 ===
The results of the 2010 election are shown below.

S.No.	Party name	Party flag or symbol	Number of Corporators
01	Shiv Sena (SS)		31
02	Bharatiya Janata Party (BJP)		09
03	Nationalist Congress Party (NCP)		15
04	Indian National Congress (INC)		15
05	Maharashtra Navnirman Sena (MNS)		26
06	Independents		21

The corporation implemented an e-governance scheme in 2002, which is being replicated across Maharashtra.
