= Titwala railway station =

Railway station in Maharashtra, India

Titwala
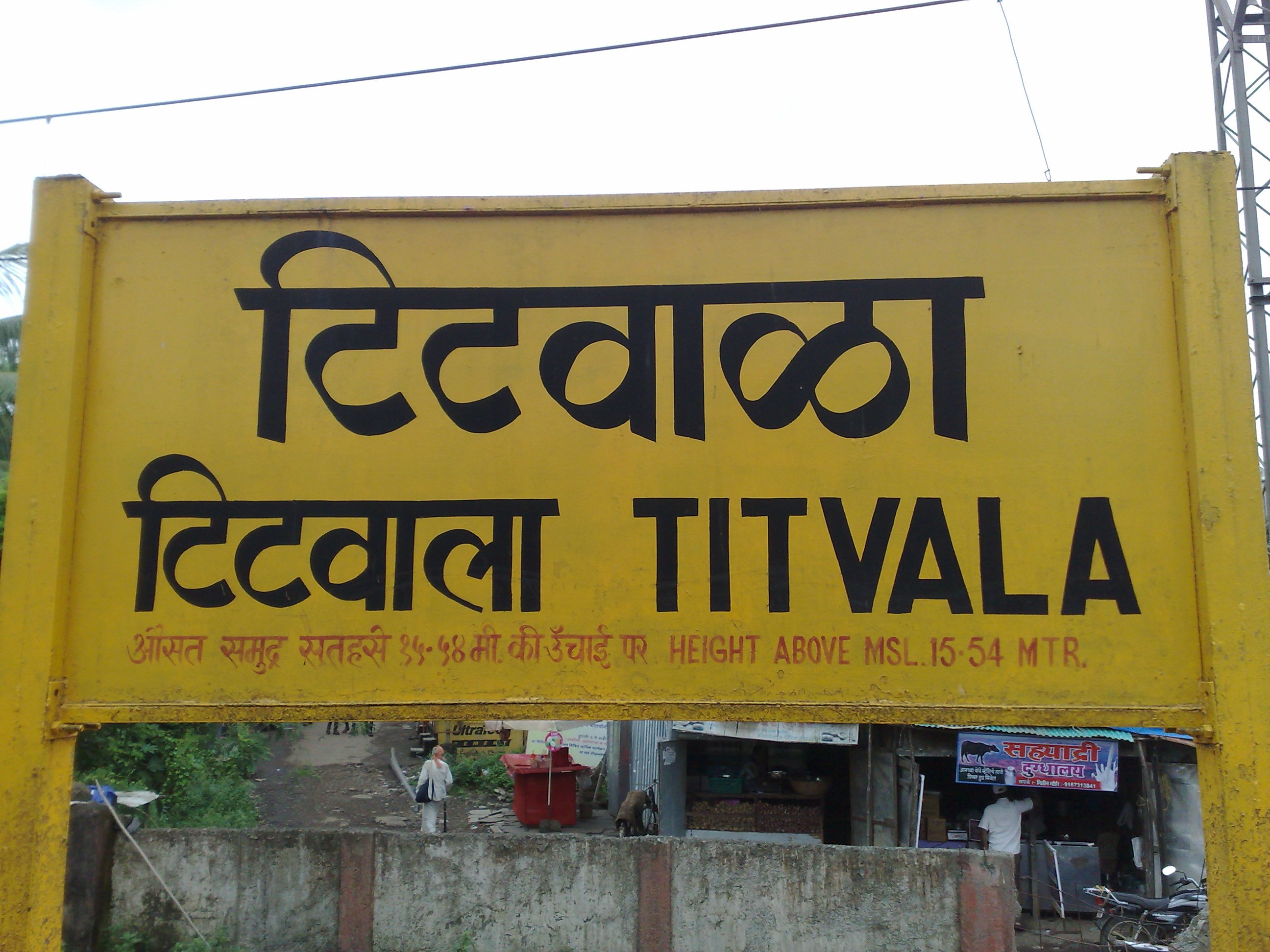

General information
- Coordinates: 19.295752°N 73.202934°E
- Elevation: 17.00 metres (55.77 ft)
- System: Indian Railways and Mumbai Suburban Railway station
- Owner: Ministry of Railways, Indian Railways
- Line: Central Line
- Platforms: 3

Other information
- Status: Active
- Station code: TLA
- Fare zone: Central Railways

History
- Opened: 1 November 1856

Services
Preceding station	Mumbai Suburban Railway	Following station
Ambivli towards Chhatrapati Shivaji Terminus	Central line	Khadavli towards Kasara
Route map
Location
- Location within Maharashtra

Titwala railway station (station code: TLA) is a railway station in the Titwala town on the Central line of the Mumbai Suburban Railway network. It is located on the route between Kalyan and Kasara. Ambivli railway station is the previous stop and Khadavli railway station is the next stop.

It is a small station with three platforms, with platforms 1 and 2 on an Island Platform in the west, and platform 3 on the east, beside the road. The station is equipped with escalators.

== Gallery ==
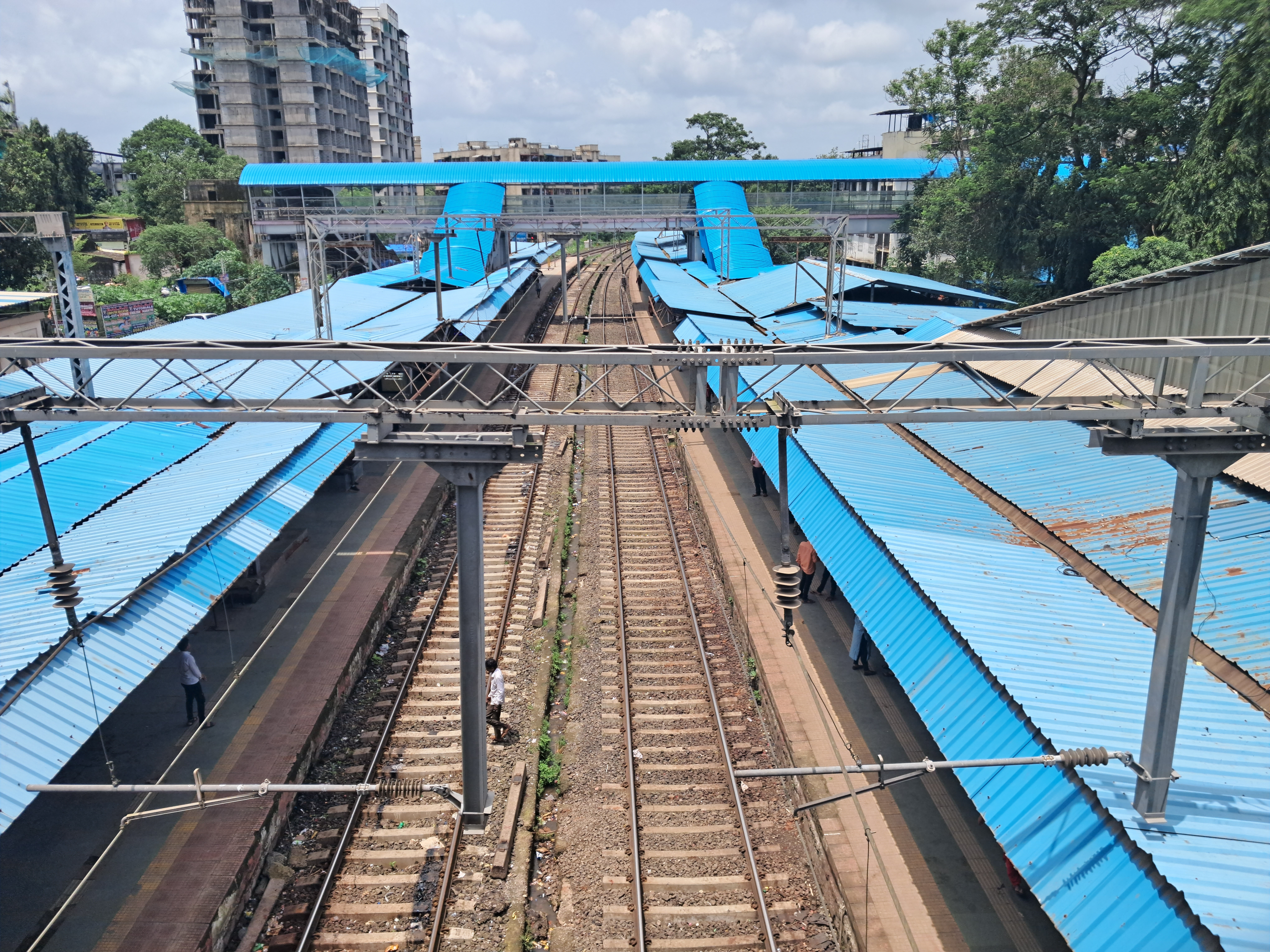
Titwala Railway station from FoB

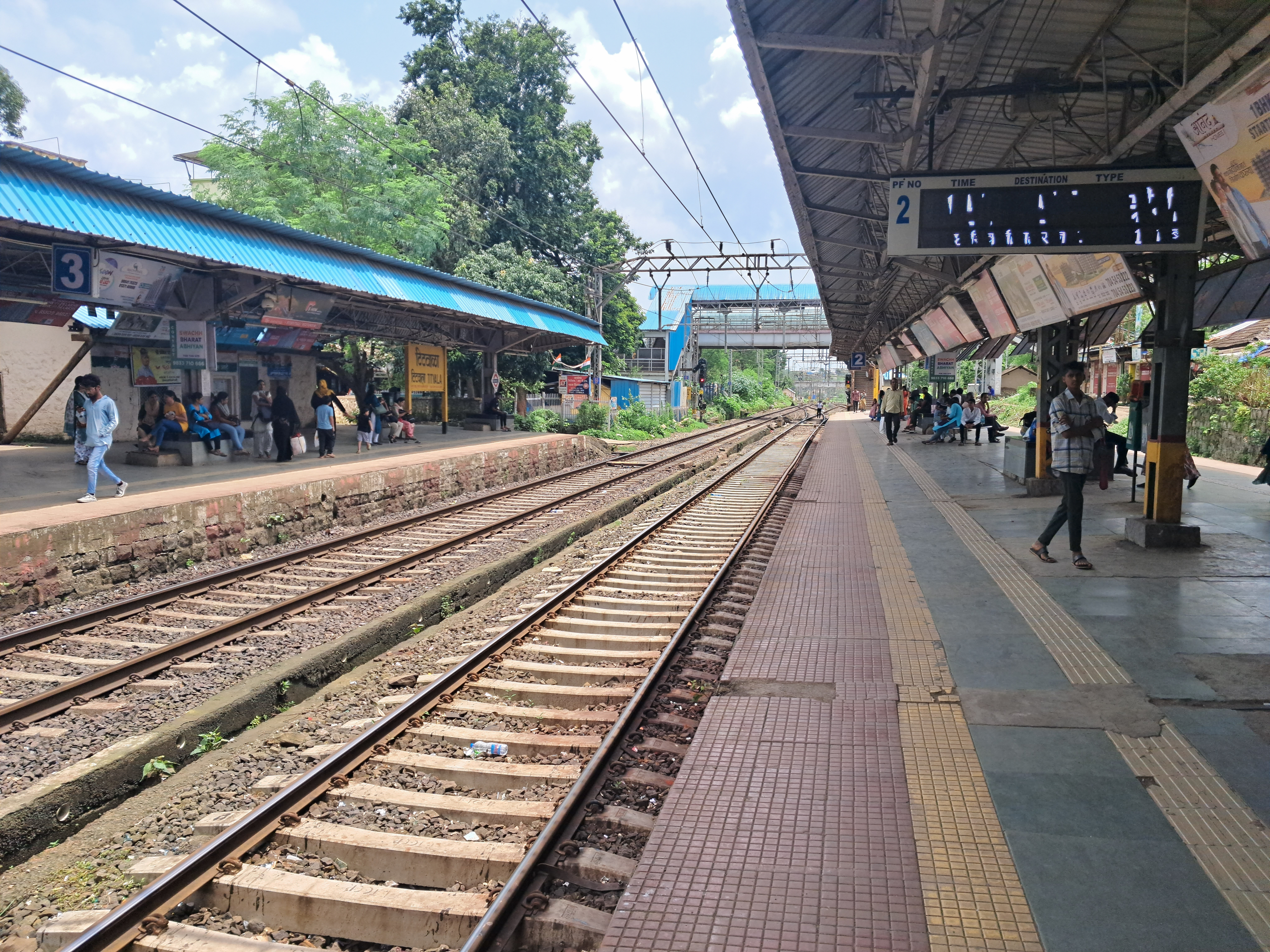
Titwala Railway station from platform no.2

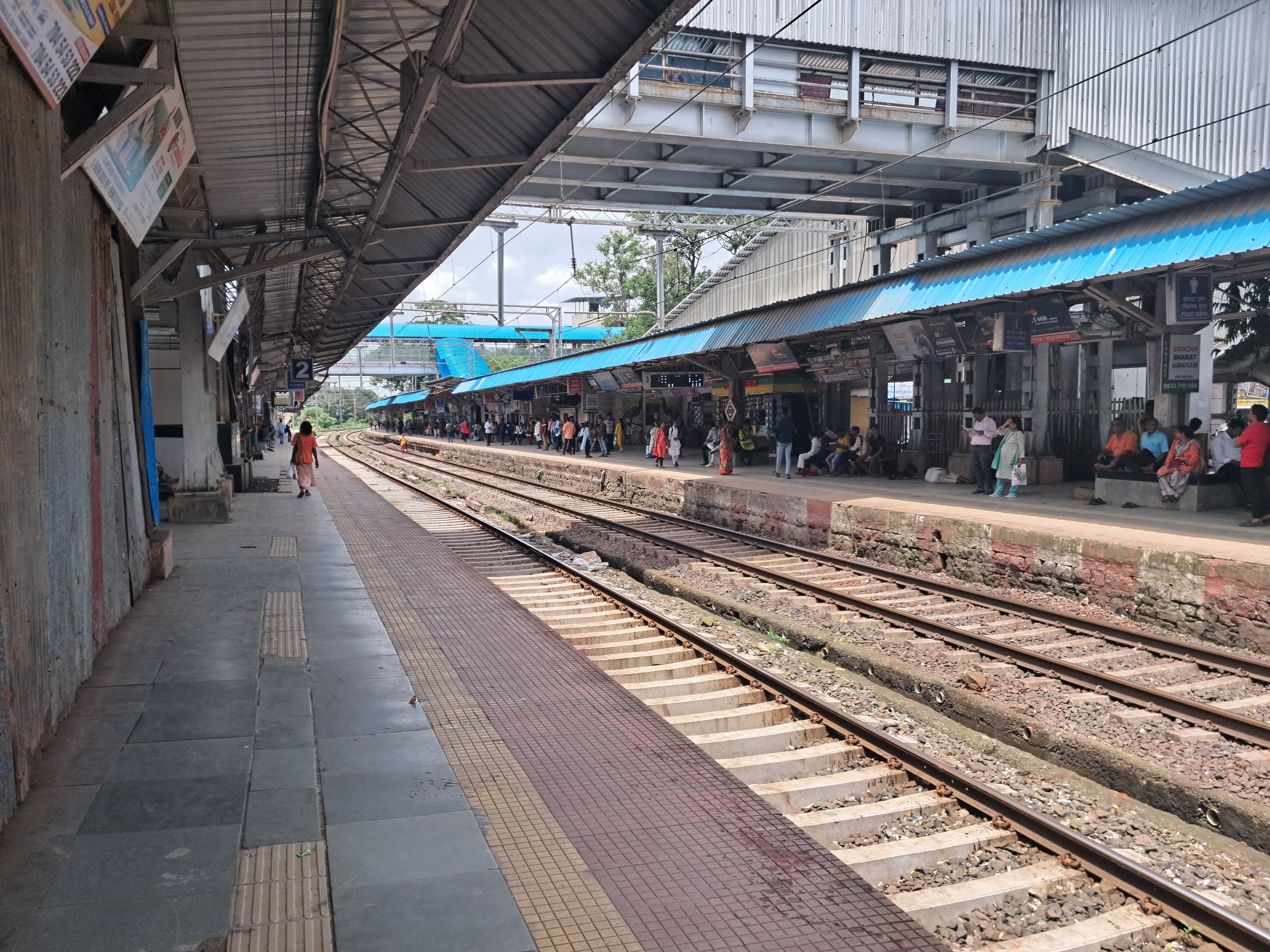
Titwala Railway station from platform no.2

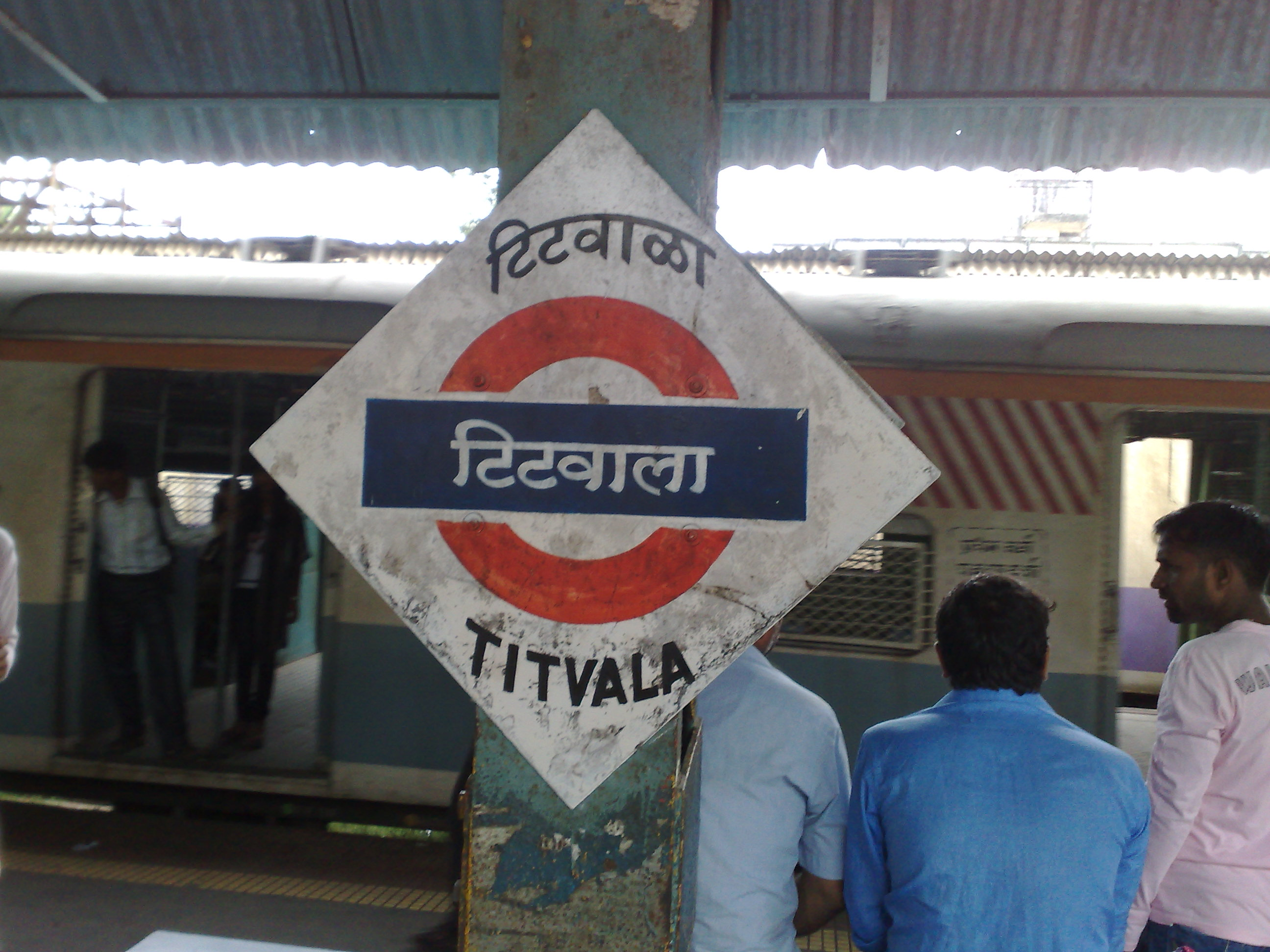
Titwala railway station – Platform board

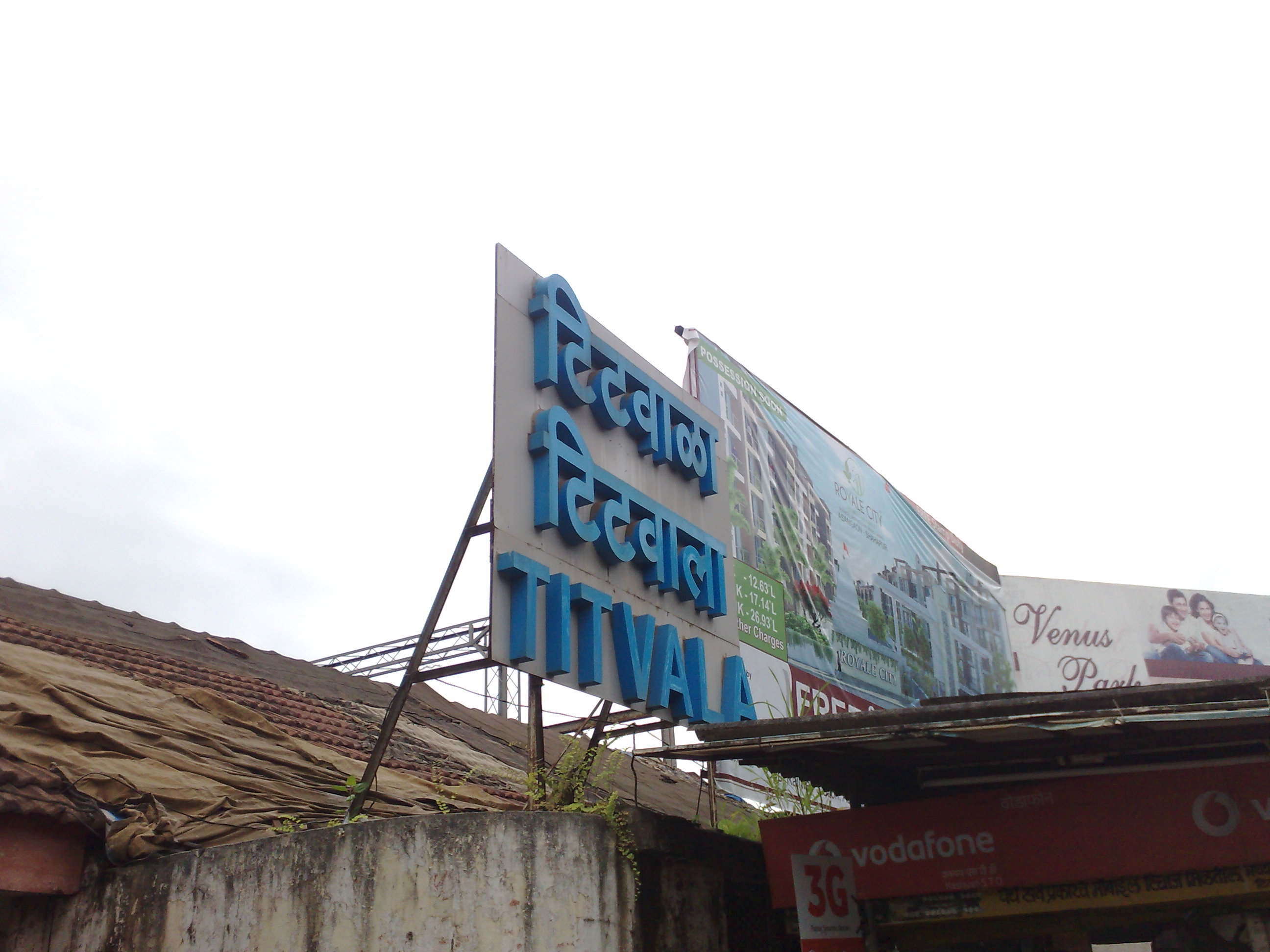
Titwala railway station – Entrance

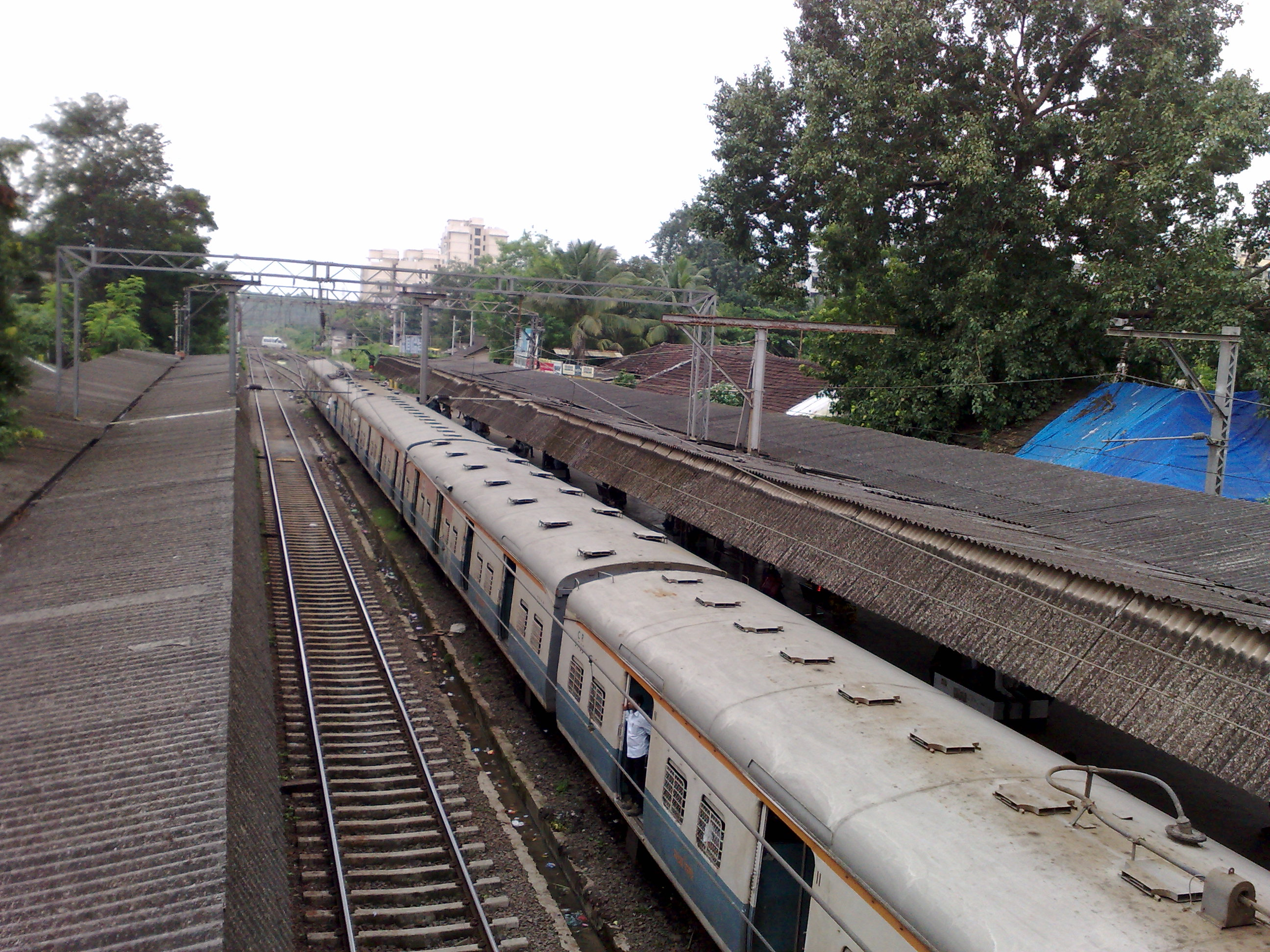
Titwala railway station – Overview

== See also ==
- Siddhivinayak Mahaganapati Temple
