= Khadakpada =

Coordinates: 19°15′34″N 73°07′40″E

- Neighbourhood
- Location within Mumbai
- Country: India
- State: Maharashtra
- District: Thane
- Taluka: Kalyan

Government
  - Type: KDMC

Languages
  - Official: Marathi
- Time zone: UTC+5:30 (IST)
- PIN: 421301
- Vehicle registration: MH 05
- Civic agency: KDMC

Khadakpada is a well developed locality in the west part Kalyan city of Thane district in Maharashtra, India.

It is a residential and commercial hub in the Kalyan Region. Khadakpada is located around 3 km away from Kalyan Junction railway station.

A branch of University of Mumbai is under construction in this locality.
