= Ambivli =

Mohone RS Tekdi Ambivali
- town
- Location in Maharashtra, India
- Coordinates: 19.265133°N 73.172373°E
- Country: India
- State: Maharashtra
- District: Thane
- Elevation: 7 m (23 ft)

Languages
  - Official: Marathi
- Time zone: UTC+5:30 (IST)
- PIN: 421 102
- Telephone code: 0251
- Vehicle registration: MH-05

Mohone is a small town, around 60 kilometres North-East of Mumbai. It falls under the Kalyan-Dombivli Municipal Corporation and is often referred by the name R.S Mohane

== Transport ==
Ambivli station is the nearest railway station to Mohone, which is accessible by train via the Mumbai Suburban Railway system on the Central Line.

Mohone is accessible by road from Kalyan and also has two alternate routes to Titwala. There is bus service every 15 – 20 minutes from Kalyan, operated by KDMT.

The nearest airport is Mumbai's Chhatrapati Shivaji International Airport.

== History ==
There is no credible information on how Mohone got its name though there is a myth that it may have got the name from the Mohoni Goddess. Early settlers and tribals inhibited pockets of land around Mohone.

Mohone came into limelight when a major chemical and rayon manufacturing company called National Rayon Corporation (FOUNDER MR.RASHIKLAL CHINAI SHET NOW CALLED NRC Ltd) established their Functional working unit. The company provided living facilities (apartments, hospital, club, school, shopping) to the employees thus forming the NRC Colony. NRC Ltd, went on to become one of the top companies of India in the early 1970s. Such an establishment resulted in sudden population growth and an opportunity for new businesses.

== Economy ==
Mohone's economy largely depended on National Rayon Corporation. The founder of this company was Mr. Rashiklal chinai shet. Its population consisted mostly of middle-class community and the labour class. Mohone maintained a steady economy until recently when it faced few problems due to lockout of NRC on 15 November 2009.

Another company that has its Work unit near to Mohone in Ambivli is Balkrishna Industries Ltd.

Other than the company's employees, outskirts of Mohone has owned farmers, mostly early settlers. These farmers mostly earn their income by selling their crop in major cities like Kalyan and Dombivli.

Falco World, Located on the Shahad Titwala Road, next to NRC compound being developed by Falco Developers., Axis Spaces Builders and Developers have township project in Ambivli named as La promenade, Located next to NRC Compound.

== Schools ==
Mohone houses for some of the following schools: 1] NRC School is a initially Top Pvt School in Thane - Mumbai City after company Lock out the school takeovers by ZP

2] Patil Balmandir school and junior college Patil balmandir was started with big intentions. The school has total of three buildings which are used for different age group of students.

3] Shantaram Patil Vidyalay Shantaram Patil school is a government school comes under K.D.M.C. Landlord Mr. Shantaram Patil donated his land for school .

4] Bhasker Hindi English School The school has total of two buildings which are used for different age group of students.

5) Gajanan Hiru Patil School And Jr College of Arts, Commerce and Science. The school has total of two buildings which are used for different age group of students. All class rooms are digitally equipped.
