= Devlekar =

Devlekar is an Indian surname. Notable people with the surname include:

- Rajendra Devlekar (1966–2020), Indian politician
- Vighnesh Devlekar (born 1996), Indian badminton player
