= Gholap =

Gholap is a surname. Notable people with the surname include:

- Babanrao Gholap (fl. 1990), Indian politician
- Vaijayanti Gholap (fl. 1995), Indian politician
- Yogesh Gholap (fl. 2014), Indian politician
