= Mitee-Chaar =

Theatre group in Kalyan, Maharashtra, India

Coordinates: 19°14′42″N 73°7′31″E

Mitee-Chaar is a theatre group in Kalyan, Maharashtra, India.
