= Ulhasnagar Municipal Corporation =

Local civic body in Ulhasnagar, Maharashtra, India

Type
- Type: Municipal Corporation of the Ulhasnagar

Leadership
- Mayor: Ashwini Kamlesh Nikam, SHS
- Deputy Mayor: Amar Lund, BJP
- Municipal Commissioner & Administrator: Dr. Raja Dayanidhi, IAS

Structure
- Seats: 78
- Political groups: Government (73): BJP (37); SHS (36); Opposition (5): VBA (2); INC (1); SAI (1); IND (1)

Elections
- Last election: 15 January 2026
- Next election: 2031

The Ulhasnagar Municipal Corporation (UMC) is the governing body of the city of Ulhasnagar in the Indian state of Maharashtra. It is part of the Mumbai Metropolitan Region and Thane district in Konkan division. It has 78 members. Municipal Corporation mechanism in India was introduced during British Rule with formation of municipal corporation in Madras (Chennai) in 1688, later followed by municipal corporations in Bombay (Mumbai) and Calcutta (Kolkata) by 1762. Ulhasnagar Municipal Corporation is headed by Mayor of city and governed by Commissioner. Ulhasnagar Municipal Corporation has been formed with functions to improve the town's infrastructure.

== Localities in Ulhasnagar Municipal Corporation ==
- Ulhasnagar
- Vithalwadi
- Shahad
- Mharal
- Varap
- Kamba

== List of mayors ==
- date=2015

== Overview ==
The municipal corporation consists of democratically elected members, is headed by a mayor, and administers the city's infrastructure, public services, and police. Members from the state's leading political parties hold elected offices in the corporation.

== Revenue sources ==
The following are the Income sources for the Corporation from the Central and State Governments.

=== Revenue from taxes ===
The following is the tax-related revenue of the corporation.

- Property tax.
- Profession tax.
- Entertainment tax.
- Grants from the Central and State Governments, such as the Goods and Services Tax.
- Advertisement tax.

=== Revenue from non-tax sources ===
The following is the non-tax-related revenue for the corporation.

- Water usage charges.
- Fees from Documentation services.
- Rent received from municipal property.
- Funds from municipal bonds.

== Corporation Election 2012 ==
=== Political performance in Election 2012 ===
The results of Election 2012 are as follows.

| S.No. | Party name | Party flag or symbol | Number of Corporators |
|---|---|---|---|
| 01 | Nationalist Congress Party (NCP) | | 20 |
| 02 | Shiv Sena (SS) | | 19 |
| 03 | Bharatiya Janata Party (BJP) | | 11 |
| 04 | Indian National Congress (INC) | | 08 |
| 03 | Bahujan Samaj Party (BSP) | | 02 |
| 06 | Maharashtra Navnirman Sena (MNS) | | 01 |
| 07 | Other Registered Parties | | 04 |
| 08 | Independents | | 13 |

== Corporation Election 2017 ==
=== Political performance in Election 2017 ===
The results of Election 2017 are as follows.

| S.No. | Party name | Party flag or symbol | Number of Corporators |
|---|---|---|---|---|
| 01 | Bharatiya Janata Party (BJP) | | 32 | ▲21 |
| 02 | Shiv Sena (SS) | | 25 | ▲06 |
| 01 | Nationalist Congress Party (NCP) | | 04 | ▼16 |
| 04 | Indian National Congress (INC) | | 01 | ▼07 |
| 05 | Maharashtra Navnirman Sena | | 02 | ▲01 |
| 06 | Other Registered Parties | | 14 | ▲10 |

== Corporation Election 2026 ==
=== Political performance in Election 2026 ===
The results of Election 2026 are as follows.

| S.No. | Party name | Party flag or symbol | Number of Corporators |
|---|---|---|---|---|
| 01 | Bharatiya Janata Party (BJP) | | 37 | ▲5 |
| 02 | Shiv Sena (SS) | | 36 | ▲11 |
| 03 | Indian National Congress (INC) | | 01 | Steady |
| 04 | Other Registered Parties | | 4 | ▼11 |
