= G. R. Patil College =

- Type: Public college
- Established: 1978
- Affiliations: University of Mumbai
- Location: Kalyan-Shil Road, Sonarpada, Dombivli East, Dombivli, Maharashtra, India; 19.197299°N 73.100510°E
- Campus: Urban
- Website: www.grpatilcollegedombivli.edu.in

G. R. College of Dombivli, Mumbai is a higher secondary and degree college. It provides education for HSC and bachelor's degree in Science, Commerce and Art. The college is managed by Mumbra Shikshan Prasarak Mandal (which has other educational institutes). It is considered a popular college in Mumbai.

The college started providing education in B.Sc. information technology in 2007-08 and in Bachelor in medical science in 2009–10.

G. R. College is associated with National Service Scheme where it has adopted the area of Dombivli for its community service.
