= Chandanapuri Ghat =

- Interactive map of Chandanapuri Ghat

Third Approach
- Location: Maharashtra, India
- Range: Sahyadri

Chandanapuri Ghat is a mountain pass across the Sahyadri on Pune-Nasik National Highway (NH50). Chandanapuri village is on one end of this ghat and on the other is Ghargaon village. This ghat has some steep turns which make this ghat a difficult ghat of the Sahyadri. The traffic between Pune and Nasik is heavy due Mumbai, Pune and Nasik make Maharashtra's industrial triangle due to which this ghat is an important mountain pass in Maharashtra like the Bhor Ghat between Mumbai and Pune and Thal Ghat between Mumbai and Nasik.

New alignment of NH-50 was opened to traffic from March 2017, this alignment replaces the old 2 lane road of the ghat with a 4 lane toll road.
