= Mahi G =

Indian rapper (born 1997)

- Born: Madhura Ghane; 1997 (age 28–29); Kalyan, Maharashtra, India
- Origin: Varunbhushi, Maharashtra, India
- Genres: Rap
- Occupations: Rapper; Lyricist; Engineer
- Years active: 2021–present

Madhura Ghane (born c. 1997), known professionally as Mahi G, is an Indian rapper. Born into a Mahadev Koli family in Maharashtra, she is known for her music reflecting on the issues facing Adivasi and Dalit communities in India.

== Early life and education ==
Ghane was born and raised in Kalyan, a city in the Mumbai Metropolitan Region, to Koli parents originally from the village of Varanbhushi in the Ahmednagar district of Maharashtra. Ghane's father was a bus driver and her mother was a homemaker. Despite living away from the Mahadev Koli's ancestral land, Ghane was raised in Koli culture, and visited Varanbhushi semi-regularly.

While Koli girls have higher rates of dropping out of education and marrying young, Ghane's mother encouraged her to focus on her education. She studied electronic and communication engineering at college, and worked as an engineer at Infosys, using her income to fund her music.

== Career ==
Ghane moved to Mumbai to work as an engineer, but during the COVID-19 pandemic, she lived with her grandmother in Varanbhushi, where she witnessed the impact of displacement and pollution on rural farming communities. Ghane began writing poetry in Hindi and Marathi. She transitioned to rapping after being inspired by the 2020–2021 Indian farmers' protest, as well as the 2019 film Gully Boy, which followed aspiring rappers living in Mumbai.

Much of Ghane's music documents the lives of the Adivasi and Dalit communities in India, who live outside of the country's entrenched caste system. Common themes in her work include the impact of climate change on rural communities ("Hasdeo Ki Kahani"); violence against women ("Kab Tak"); the experiences of the hijra community ("Haq Se Hijra"); and the work of anti-caste activists such as B. R. Ambedkar ("Baapmanus"). During the 2025 India–Pakistan heat wave, and to mark World Environment Day, Ghane released the single "Heatwave" in collaboration with Greenpeace India and RapBoss, in which she rapped out the impact of climate change on manual workers.

During her performances, Ghane has been known to incorporate traditional Adivasi clothing from tribes living in Chhattisgarh, Jharkhand, Maharashtra and Madhya Pradesh into her outfits, including wearing kurtas, lugra saris, and ambadas. Ghane performed at RADA, the first Marathi pop culture festival; she has also performed internationally, including in Nepal, where her performance coincided with the outbreak of the 2025 Nepalese Gen Z protests.

In 2025, Ghane's 2021 debut single "Jungale Cha Raja" went viral on social media where it was frequently used by videos about climate change. Famous users of the song included the director Anurag Kashyap, and Ghane was compared to fellow Adivasi rapper Arivu; the song's lyrics included references to the Adevasi foundational beliefs of jal (water), jangal (forest) and jameen (land). That same year, Ghane received the Indie Music Creator prize at the Lokmat Social Media Awards, as well as the Fatimabi Savitri Puraskar from Maharashtra's Women Commission in recognition of her speaking out on social injustice.
