= Siddhivinayak Mahaganapati Temple =

Hindu Temple

- श्री सिध्दीविनायक महागणपती मंदिर
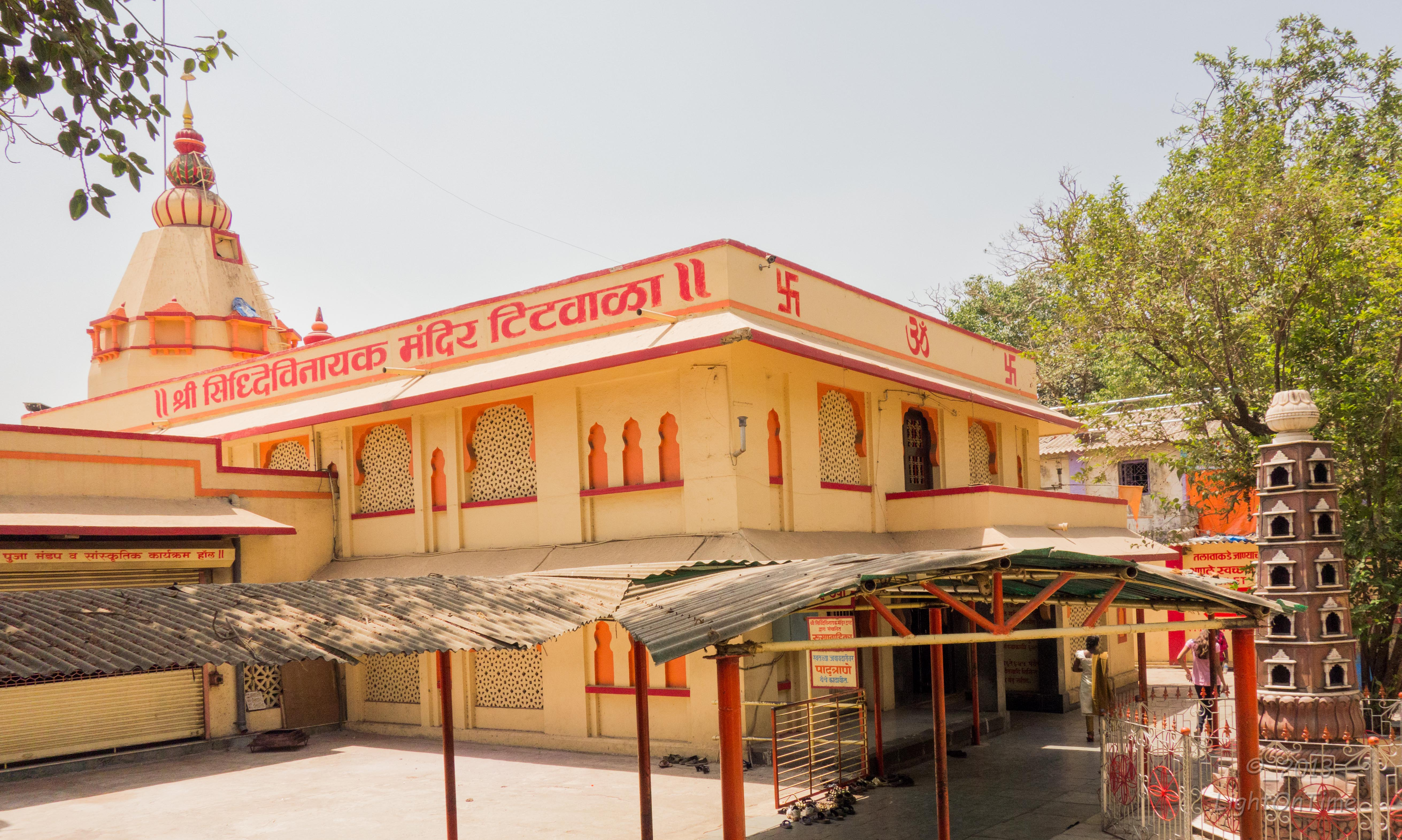
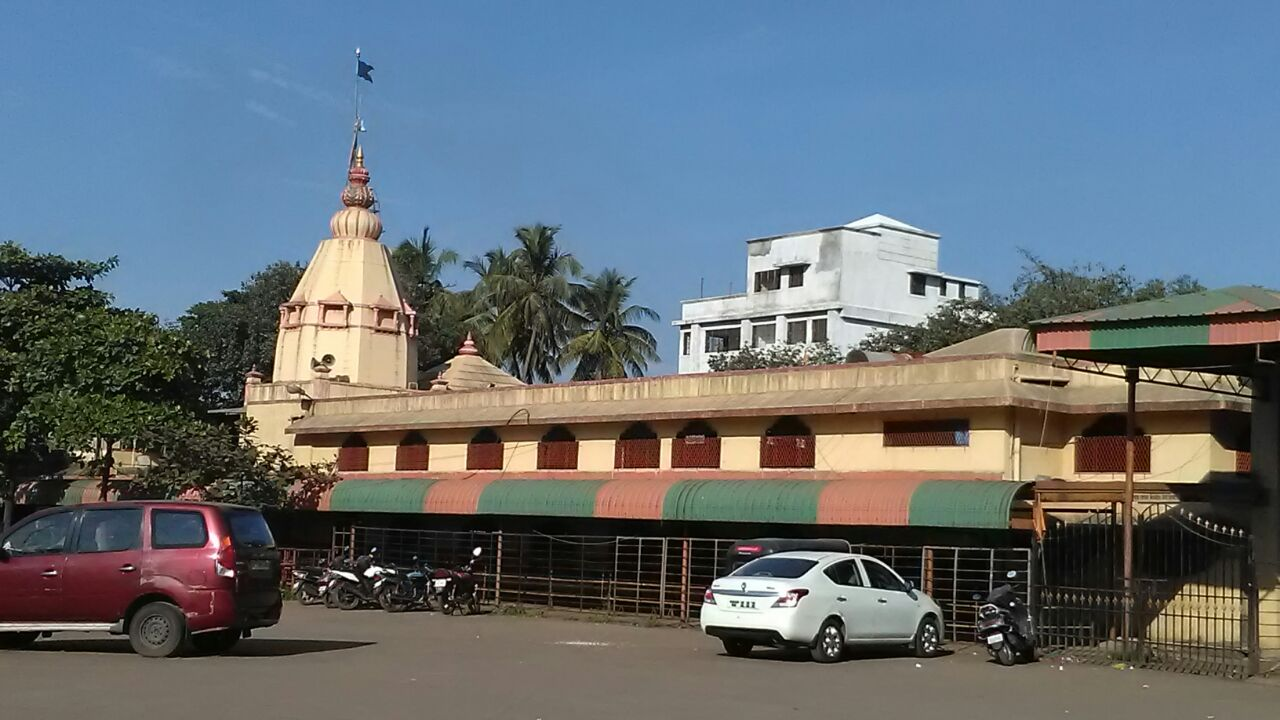
- Siddhivinayak Mahaganapati Temple, Titwala (Maharashtra, India)

- Location in Maharashtra

Religion
- Affiliation: Hinduism
- Deity: Ganesha

Location
- Location: Titwala
- State: Maharashtra
- Country: India
- Interactive map of Siddhivinayak Mahaganapati Temple
- Coordinates: 19°18′02″N 73°13′18″E

Architecture
- Type: North Indian Architecture
- Creator: Shakuntala on sage Kanva’s directive
- Completed: original structure: Ancient (unknown) present structure: 1965–66

The Siddhivinayaka Mahaganapati Temple is a Hindu temple located in Titwala, a small town in the Kalyan taluka of Thane district – near Mumbai, Maharashtra, India. The temple is dedicated to the Hindu, elephant-headed god of wisdom, Ganesha. Titwala is believed to be the putative site of the hermitage of sage Kanva, foster parent of Shakuntala who was born here. The place is steeped in ancient legend and the temple is frequented by a very large number of devotees on account of the belief that separated married couples could be united and marriages of desired people could be fixed easily if the Ganesha image installed in the temple is worshipped with devotion. This temple is frequented mostly on Tuesdays.

== Legend ==
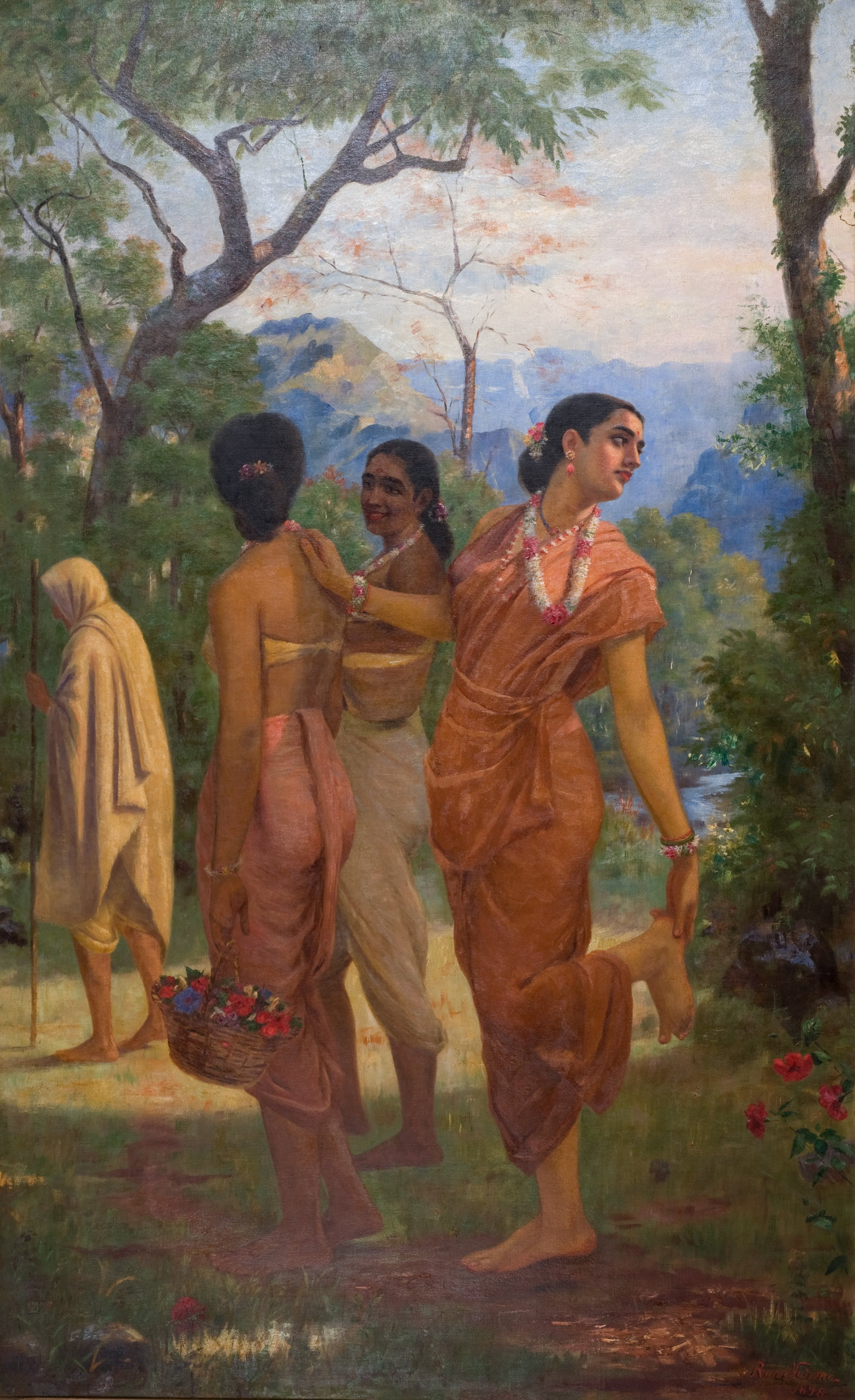
Shakuntala, with her friends. Painting by Raja Ravi Varma

According to legend, this village was part of the Dandakaranya forest where the Katkari tribe lived (the tribal hamlets are located even now close to the town across the Kalu river, approached only by boats). Sage Kanva had his hermitage here. Kanva was the author of several hymns of the scripture Rigveda and one of the Angirasas. He had adopted Shakuntala, who was abandoned immediately after her birth by her parents, sage Vishwamitra and the celestial damsel Menaka. Shakuntala’s story has been narrated in the Hindu epic Mahabharata and dramatised by Kālidāsa, considered the greatest poet and dramatist in Sanskrit language, in his play called the Abhijñānaśākuntalam (“The Recognition of Shakuntala").

King Dushyanta of the Gandhara Kingdom while on a battle campaign was passing through the forests when he and Shakuntala fell in love with each other and got married according to the Gandharva rite (exchanging garlands as a marriage vow) in the hermitage. Since Dushyanta had to leave Shakuntala after some time due to unrest in his capital city, he gave Shakuntala a royal signet (a ring) as a sign of their love, promising her that he would return for her.

Once, while Shakuntala was in the hermitage, in a pensive dreaming mood thinking about her husband Dushyanta, she did not pay the desired reverential attention to sage Durvasa who was visiting the place. Durvasa, known for his short temper, felt offended by this slight, cursed Shakuntala saying that the person she was dreaming of would forget about her altogether. However, later, Durvasa toned down his curse to mean that the person who had forgotten Shakuntala would remember everything again if she showed him a personal token that had been given to her. As per the curse, Dushyanta refused to recognise her.

According to local legend, sage Kanva, realising the gravity of the issue faced by his adopted daughter Shakuntala, directed her to build a shrine in honour of the god Ganesha as Siddhi Vinayaka. He assured her that by her sincere prayers Siddhi Vinayaka would bless her and she would once again join her husband Dushyanta. This eventually came true after considerable effort and lapse of time and by which time Shakuntala who had conceived after marrying Dushyanta, also gave birth to a son who came to be known as Bharata according to Mahabharata epic. Pandavas and Kauravas were descendants of Bharata.

== History ==
The Siddhivinayaka Mahaganapati temple built by Shakuntala with the stated legendary background was submerged under a tank. During the rule of the Peshwa Madhavrao I, to resolve the drought situation in the town, the tank was de-silted to provide drinking water to the town. It was during the de-silting operations that the temple was found buried. The image of god Ganesha was found by Peshwa sardar Ramchandra Mehendale, buried in the silt. Soon thereafter, the renovation of the temple was undertaken and a stone temple was built. Peshwa Madhavrao I consecrated the ancient Ganesha image in this new temple, after the conquest of Vasai fort. Initially, the temple was very small with a wooden sabha mandap (audience hall), which was in a run-down condition. Since the Peshwa temple had also degenerated over time, in 1965–66, renovation work was initiated again and a new temple was constructed at the same location at cost of ₹200,000 (US$2,100).

== Architecture and recent renovations ==
The current temple is built on 3–5 acres (1–2 ha) land donated by the Peshwas, which was further supplemented by 12 acres (4.9 ha) of additional land donated by the Joshis, the hereditary priests of the temple. The existing audience hall, after renovation, measures 90 feet (27 m)x45 feet (14 m) and has been provided with galleries that overlook the main hall. The raised platform on which temple has been built with stone is 3.5 feet (1.1 m) in height. The temple hall has marble flooring. Recently, the eyes and the navel of the image have been decorated with ruby stones. On the right of the main entrance door is a shrine containing a Shiva-linga. In front of the temple, there is also an impressive lamp tower. The temple Shikhara (pinnacle) is decorated with sculptures of the Ashtavinayaka, central images from eight revered Ganesha temples near Pune, Maharashtra. In the main sanctum, on the right corner padukas (foot wear) of Shri Vengaonkar Joshi, a Ganesha devotee is also seen.

In May 2009, the temple trust and the Kalyan Dombivali Municipal Corporation (KDMC) had have completed renovation of the temple – initiated 5 years ago. At a cost of ₹15 million (US$160,000), the renovation work provides regulated entry arrangements and basic facilities to cater to a very large number of devotees who visit the temple. The lake, Titwala Talav next to the temple, has also been de-silted recently and facilities created for boating.

== Devotees and auspicious days ==
Based on the popular legend narrated, Hindus believe that by devotional worship of the Titwala Ganesha, marriage to one’s wished person will take place and marital discord will be happily resolved. The temple is visited by lacs of devotees, particularly on Angarika Chaturthi (Angariki) – a Tuesday that follows on the fourth day of the lunar bright fortnight. Tuesday as well as the fourth day of the lunar fortnight are considered auspicious days to worship Ganesha, both of which attract a fair number of worshippers to the temple. Ganesh Chaturthi and Ganesh Jayanti is celebrated with great fervour, when more than 500,000 people congregate for worship in the temple. Ganesh Chaturthi or Ganeshotsav is the central festival of Ganesha that falls on the fourth day of the bright lunar fortnight in the Hindu month of Bhadrapada (August–September). Ganesha Jayanti or Maghi Ganeshotsav is the birthday of Ganesha, which falls on the fourth day of the bright lunar fortnight in the Hindu month of Magha (January–February). The temple is often frequented by devotees from Mumbai.

== Topography ==
The Kalu river is a small river that flows close to Titwala in its upstream reaches. The Kalu River also flows close to Ambivali, a little farther from Titwala. This river after flowing westwards, in its downstream, receives the small Bhatsa River, which in turn joins the Ulhas River near Kalyan, an industrial suburb of Mumbai. In its further course of 45 kilometres (28 mi), the river receives effluents from several industrial units.

== Other shrines ==
At this pilgrim centre, apart from the Ganesha Temple, the other famous temple is dedicated to Vithoba, a local form of Krishna and his consort Rukmini. Sri Shani Temple is near Sri swamy Samarth Math, Sadguru Nivas, Titwala (E). Sri Sai Baba Temple at Titwala (E), Sri Hanuman Temple is near Titwala Station. Another renowned temple is at Ambarnath, close by, which is dated to the 11th century, constructed in the Hemadpanthi style of architecture, which is named after its introducer and founder, prime minister Hemadpant in the court of Seuna Yadavas of Devagiri. Vaishno Devi temple is nestled in Titwala 22 minutes walking distance from Titwala station east towards south direction. It is a temple of Mata Bhavtarini – Vaishno Devi. Manju Mataji takes care of this temple and organised Chowki's either on Tuesdays or Fridays every week. Big Chowki comes twice a year in Navratri on Ashtami. Manju mata (Ludhiana) and second is in Titwala (Thane). People do come in huge numbers around 300,000 for darshan of mata rani. Durga Puja during October is also known as Akal Bodhon or untimely invocation, Vasant Navratri, also known as Chaitra Navratras or Spring Navratri or Basant Navratri. As this Navratra coincides with Ram Navami, it also referred as Ram Navratri. Vasant Navratri (Chaitra). Lord Ram who changed the period of Durga Puja. Lord Ram wanted to get the blessings of Goddess Durga before beginning the war with Ravana. Therefore, he invoked Goddess Durga during Ashwin (October – November).Devotees are not allowed to wear any leather articles like wallet, belt and handy bag. Transport facilities are available from station.
