= Apeksha Patil =

Politician of the Shiv sena party, Maharashtra

- अपेक्षा पाटील

Mayor of Ulhasnagar Municipal Corporation
- Incumbent
- Assumed office 2014

Personal details
- Party: Shiv Sena

Apeksha Patil (Marathi: अपेक्षा पाटील) is a politician of the Shiv Sena party in Thane district, Maharashtra. She is the current mayor of Ulhasnagar Municipal Corporation.

== Positions held ==
- 2012: Elected as corporator in Ulhasnagar Municipal Corporation
- 2015: Elected as Mayor of Ulhasnagar Municipal Corporation
