= Suhaag (1979 film) =

- Poster
- Directed by: Manmohan Desai
- Written by: Kader Khan; Prayag Raj; K.K. Shukla
- Produced by: Rajinder Kumar Sharma; Ramesh Sharma; Shakti Subhash Sharma; Prakash Trehan
- Starring: Shashi Kapoor; Amitabh Bachchan; Rekha; Parveen Babi
- Cinematography: V. Durga Prasad
- Edited by: Mukhtar Ahmed
- Music by: Laxmikant–Pyarelal
- Distributed by: Sharma Cine Associates
- Release date: 16 November 1979
- Running time: 169 minutes
- Country: India
- Language: Hindi
- Budget: ₹20 million
- Box office: ₹50 million

Suhaag (transl. Marital state, Wifehood, or the happy state of a woman whose husband is alive) is a 1979 Indian Hindi-language action drama film directed by Manmohan Desai, and written by Kader Khan, Prayag Raj and K.K. Shukla. It stars Shashi Kapoor, Amitabh Bachchan, Rekha and Parveen Babi in lead roles with Amjad Khan, Nirupa Roy, Kader Khan, Ranjeet and Jeevan in supporting roles. The music was composed by Laxmikant Pyarelal. It was also remade by K. Raghavendra Rao in Telugu (1981) as "Satyam Shivam" with casting NTR, Sridevi & ANR, Rati Agnihotri.

A huge box office success, the film became the highest-grossing film of 1979.

== Plot ==
Durga (Nirupa Roy) and Vikram Kapoor (Amjad Khan) have been married for years. Vikram has taken to crime in a big way and as a result has antagonized a rival gangster, Jaggi (Kader Khan). Durga gives birth to twins, but Jaggi steals one of them and sells him to a bootlegger, Pascal. Durga is upset when she finds her son missing, but is devastated when Vikram abandons her. With a lot of difficulties, Durga brings up her son, Kishan (Shashi Kapoor), and has given up on finding her other son. Kishan has grown up and is now a dedicated police officer. On the other hand, Pascal has exploited Amit (Amitabh Bachchan), educated, and made him a petty criminal and alcoholic. This gets him in a confrontation with Kishan but the two settle their differences and become fast friends. Vikram is not aware of his two sons and wife being alive. Without revealing his identity, he hires Amit to kill Kishan during a Navratri dance at Maa Sherawali's temple. Amit informs Kishan and together with other police personnel, keep vigil. Things do not go as planned; they are attacked and Kishan loses his eyesight, leaving the onus on Amit to try to locate the person behind this crime. Full of singing, dancing, and stunts, the film has a strong moral undertone of good triumphing over evil despite any odds.

== Cast ==
- Shashi Kapoor as Kishan Kapoor
- Amitabh Bachchan as Amit Kapoor
- Rekha as Basanti
- Parveen Babi as Anu
- Nirupa Roy as Durga Kapoor
- Amjad Khan as Vikram Kapoor
- Ranjeet as Gopal
- Kader Khan as Jaggi
- Jeevan as Pascal
- Jagdish Raj as Inspector Khan
- Krishan Dhawan as Lala Seth
- Master Titto as young Kishan
- Master Ratan as young Amit
- Moolchand as Marwadi Seth, shop owner
- Vatsala Deshmukh as Jamnabai
- Komila Virk as glamorous girl in bar

== Production ==
Many scenes were filmed at Film City, Mumbai and London. Desai filmed a middle and climax chase scene in Mumbai and London and edited them in such a way that these scenes appear to take place in Mumbai. "Teri Rab Ne Bana Di Jodi" song was filmed in Richmond Park, London with a UK-based Punjabi dance group from Southall. "Ae Yaar Sun" song was filmed in Film City and at Birla Mandir, Shahad near Ulhasnagar in Thane district of Maharashtra.

== Soundtrack ==
#	Song	Singer
1	"Aaj Imtihan Hai"	Lata Mangeshkar
2	"Athra Baras Ki Tu Hone Ko Aayi Re"	Lata Mangeshkar, Mohammed Rafi
3	"O Maata Sherawali"	Mohammed Rafi, Asha Bhosle
4	"Teri Rab Ne Bana Di Jodi"	Mohammed Rafi, Shailendra Singh, Asha Bhosle
5	"Ae Yaar Sun, Yaari Teri"	Mohammed Rafi, Shailendra Singh, Asha Bhosle
6	"Main To Beghar Hoon, Apne Ghar Le Chalo"	Asha Bhosle, Shashi Kapoor
7	"Ek Daal Pe Do Phool Khile"	Anwar

== Remake ==
The film was remade in Telugu as Satyam Sivam (1981) with N. T. Rama Rao and Akkineni Nageswara Rao.
