= Ulhas River =

River in Maharashtra, India

Coordinates: 19°18′N 72°50′E

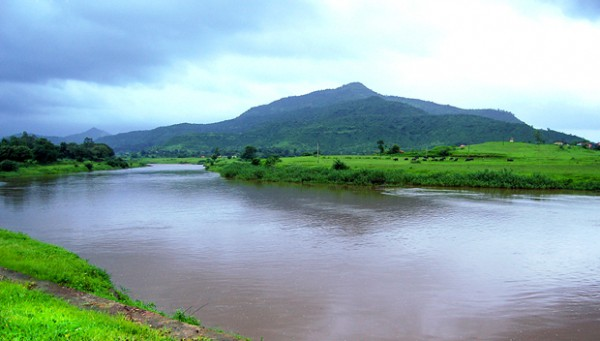

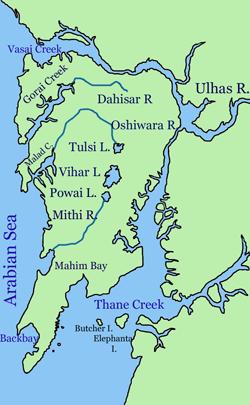

Location
- Country: India
- State: Maharashtra
- Cities: Mumbai, Thane

Physical characteristics
- Source: Western Ghats
  - location: India
- Mouth
  - location: Arabian Sea, India
- Length: 122 km (76 mi)

The Ulhas River is a west-flowing river in Maharashtra, India. It is in the Thane, Raigad, and Pune districts of that state. The Ulhas River is approximately 122 kilometres long. Its basin covers a densely populated and industrialized region, making it one of the most significant river systems in the Mumbai Metropolitan Region (MMR).

It flows north and west from its source to where it splits into Vasai Creek and Thane Creek, near Thane. The Ulhas divides Salsette Island from the mainland, and is important for the water supply of Mumbai. It originates near the Tungarli Lake in Lonavala, flows northwards through Karjat until it merges with the Poshir River at Nikhop. Further north, it merges with the Barvi River near Vasant Village. The largest tributary, the Kalu River, joins the Ulhas north of Godrej Hill, Kalyan. The volume of the water has increased significantly. Finally, at Thane, it divides into two streams, one goes towards Vasai into the Arabian Sea and the other south into the Thane Creek. It flows through cities like Karjat, Dombivli, Kalyan, and Thane.

The river is one of the major causes behind the floods observed in Mumbai each year during the monsoon season. Particularly, during the 2005 Mumbai floods, the Ulhas River overflowed following unprecedented rainfall, severely affecting the Kalyan–Dombivli region.

The Ulhas River has been an essential water source for centuries. It has supported agriculture, trade, and settlements along its banks. The river has a rich history, with its waters extensively used during the British colonial period for transporting goods. It remains vital for irrigation and domestic water supply in the Thane region.

Throughout the years, however, the rapid urbanisation and industrialisation in the Mumbai Metropolitan region have changed the face of the river and wreaked havoc on the lives, humans and fauna, dependent on it.

== Gallery ==
Ulhas River at Kondhana village in Raigad district

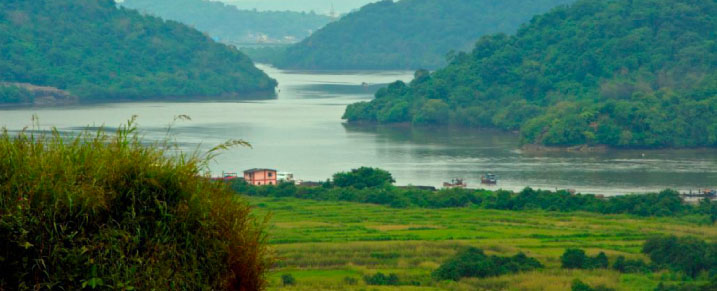
The Ulhas River, as seen from Ghodbunder

== See also ==
- List of rivers of India
- Rivers of India
- Seven Islands of Bombay
