= Thal Ghat =

Mountain pass in India

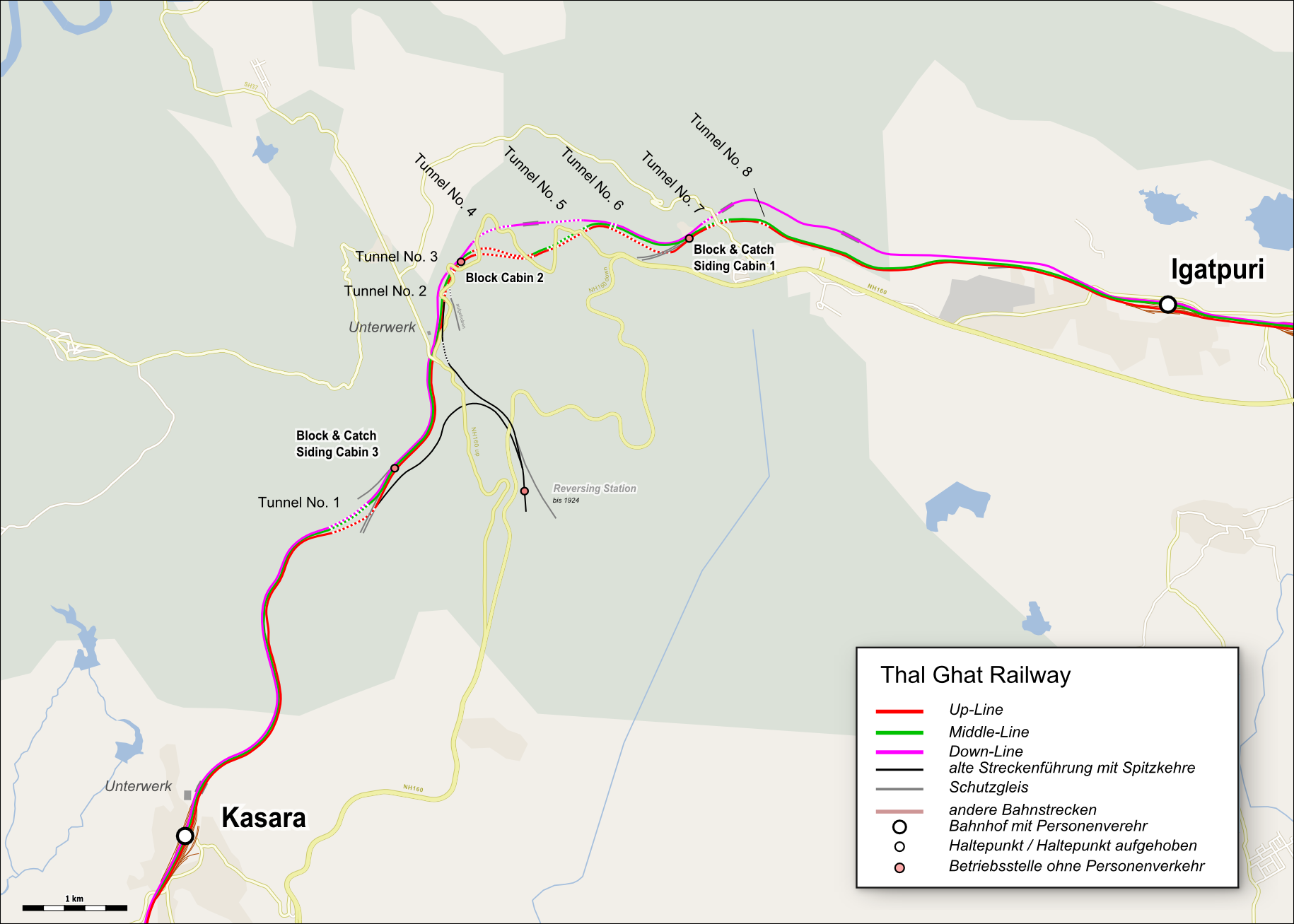
- Thal ghat map

- Location within Maharashtra

Location
- Location: Maharashtra, India
- Range: Western Ghats
- Coordinates: 19.67°N 73.48°E

Thal Ghat (also called as Thul Ghat or Kasara Ghat) is a ghat section (mountain incline or slope) in the Western Ghats near the town of Kasara in Maharashtra. The Thal Ghat is located on the busy Mumbai–Nashik route, and is one of the four major routes, rail and road routes, leading into Mumbai. The railway line, which passes through the ghat is the steepest in India with a gradient of 1 in 37.

== Thul Ghat (rail) ==
The Thul Ghat rail section was officially opened on 1 January 1865 to Egutpoora (today, Igatpuri), precisely 4 years after the line had been extended to Kassarah (today, Kasara) on 1 January 1861. The Thul Ghat (incline) is a series of mountain slopes in the Western Ghats traversed by the Bhusawal-Kalyan line. From Kalyan to Kasara, the line covers a length of 42 mi (68 km) and rises to an altitude of 948 ft (289 m) above sea level at Kasara. The next section from Kasara to Igatpuri is 9.5 mi (15 km) across Thul Ghat and within that distance the line rises from 948 ft (289 m) to 1,918 ft (585 m) the gradient in the section being 1:37. The line negotiates this steep incline with the help of curves. The Ehegaon viaduct along this line is 719 ft (219 m) long and 180 ft (55 m) high. According to IRFCA, “The viaduct is situated in a steep valley nestling in the midst of hills that skirt around it in the tunnels and then is carried across the yawning chasm on a tall imposing structure… Some of the viaducts and tunnels on this line are considered outstanding achievements in Civil Engineering and are among the finest works in the world.”

Till early-2007 Direct Current (DC) traction was used to pull trains in this sector. On 2007-05-25, the first Alternating Current (AC) 4,800 tonne goods train was hauled through this region. The AC traction has a voltage of 25,000 volts as compared to 1,500 volts of DC. When it was under Direct Current 58 wagon trains used to be detached into two separate units, and lugged separately. Now six AC locomotives pull the entire train. Winding around the railway line is National Highway 3.

=== Reversing station ===
There used to be reversing station on this ghat. This was later removed because of inconvenience after construction of new track. All trains can go down hill without back engine but some mostly must have to put the brakes hard and back engine like WAG-5 or WCAM-3

== Road ==
During much of the nineties and before, Kasara Ghat was notorious for fatal road accidents. However, since April 2009, owing to creation of separate 2-lane roads in the Ghat for each direction (under the Nashik-Mumbai Highway 4-laning project), driving through the Ghat is a breeze as head traffic is absent. In fact, the Nashik-Mumbai direction of the Ghat is something motorists might even look forward to driving on because of the flat, winding tar road.

One of India's longest road tunnels is located in Kasara. It connects Igatpuri and Kasara under the Nagpur Mumbai Super Communication Expressway (NMSCE), also known as Samruddhi Mahamarg. The tunnel is 7.7 km long which makes it the longest road tunnel in Maharashtra.

== Gallery ==
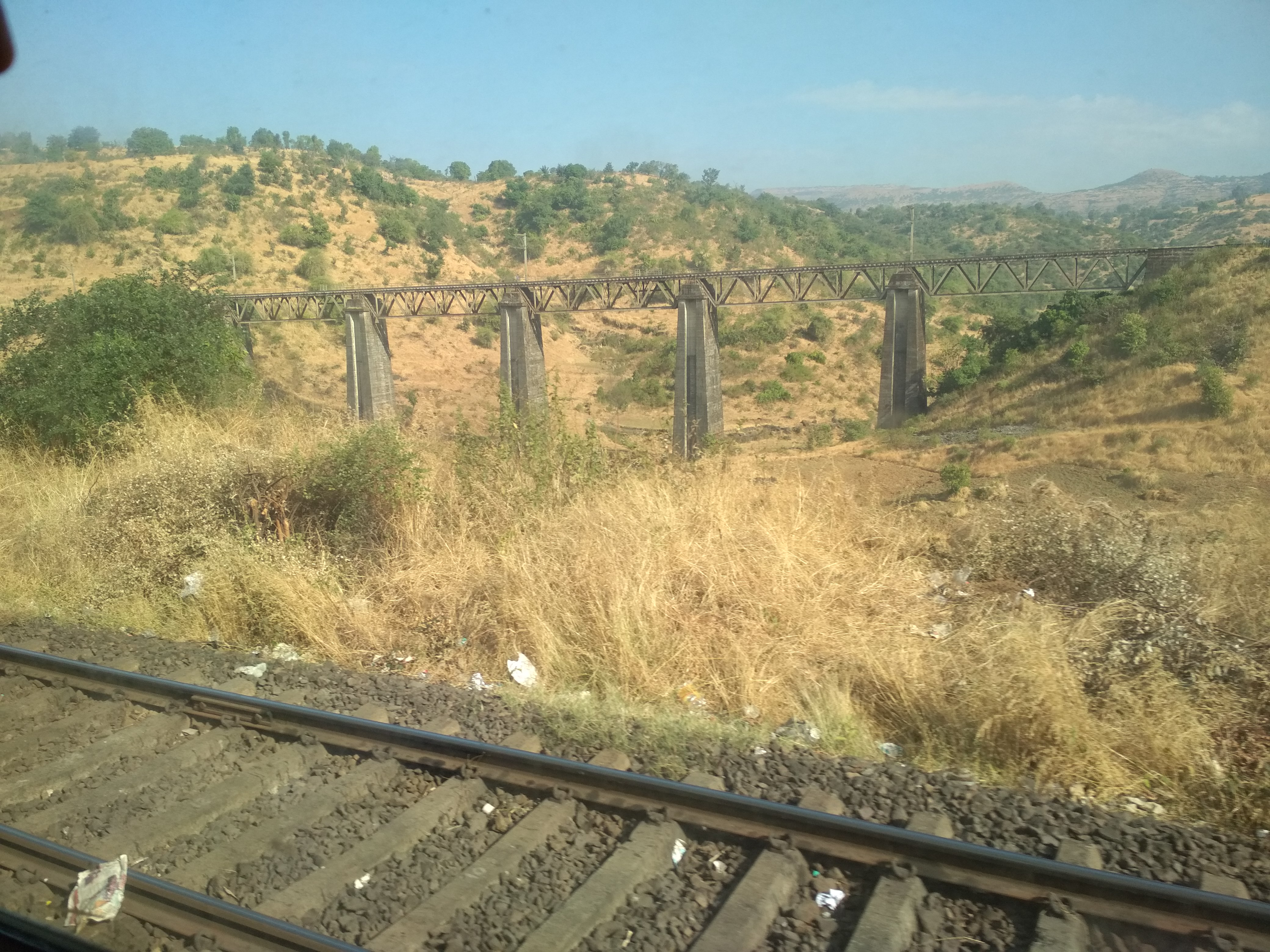

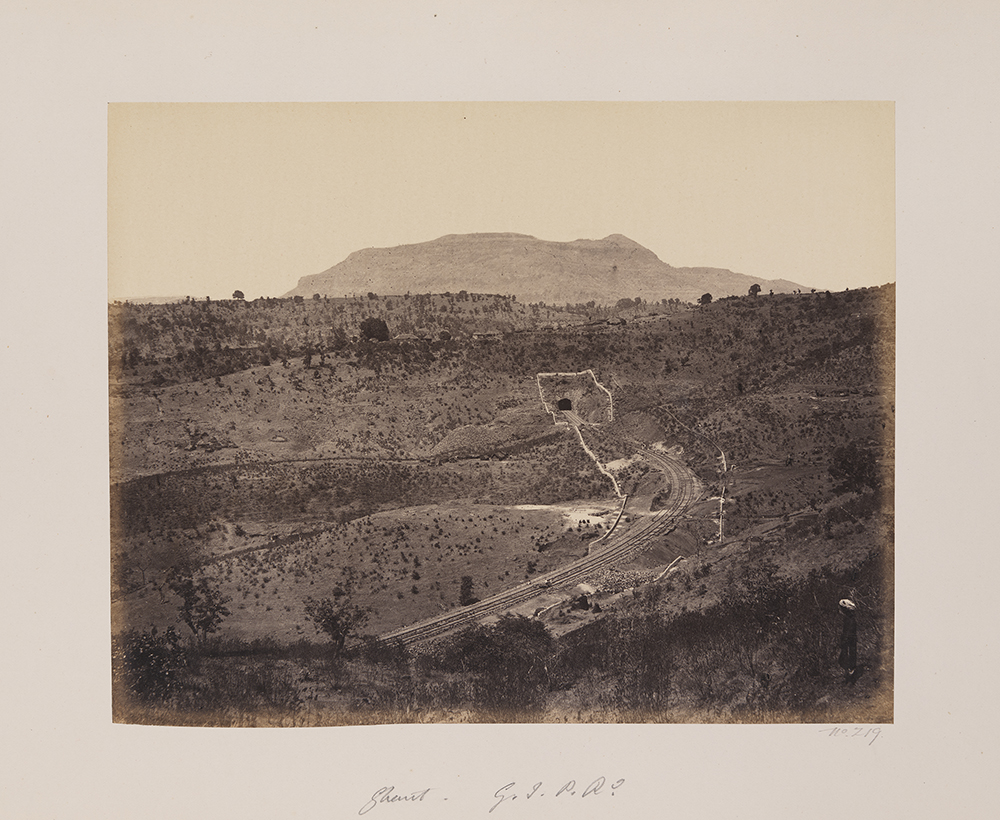
Thal Ghat between 1855-1865

== See also ==
- Bhor Ghat
