= Ambadas =

Ambadas can be a masculine given name or a middle name. Notable people with the name include:

- Ambadas Danve, Indian politician
- Hari Ambadas Gade, Indian artist
