= Vaijayanti Gholap =

Indian politician

Chairman of Education Committee, Kalyan-Dombivli Municipal Corporation
- Incumbent
- Assumed office April 2017

Mayor of Kalyan-Dombivli Municipal Corporation
- In office November 2010 – May 2013
- Succeeded by: Kalyani Patil

Personal details
- Party: Shiv Sena
- Website: vaijayantigholap.org

Vaijayanti Gholap is Shiv Sena politician from Thane district, Maharashtra, India. She was the mayor of Kalyan-Dombivli Municipal Corporation from 2010 to 2013. She has been elected to Kalyan-Dombivli Municipal Corporation for five consecutive terms from 1995 to 2020.

== Positions held ==
- 1995: Elected as corporator in Kalyan-Dombivli Municipal Corporation (1st term)
- 2000: Re-elected as corporator in Kalyan-Dombivli Municipal Corporation (2nd term)
- 2005: Re-elected as corporator in Kalyan-Dombivli Municipal Corporation (3rd term)
- 2010: Elected as corporator in Kalyan-Dombivli Municipal Corporation (4th term)
- 2010: Elected as mayor of Kalyan-Dombivli Municipal Corporation
- 2015: Re-elected as corporator in Kalyan-Dombivli Municipal Corporation (5th term)
- 2017: Elected as chairman of Education Committee in Kalyan-Dombivli Municipal Corporation
