= Rajendra Devlekar =

Indian politician (1966–2020)

Mayor of Kalyan-Dombivli
- In office 2015 – May 2018
- Preceded by: Kalyani Patil
- Succeeded by: Vinita Rane

Personal details
- Born: 1966
- Died: 22 September 2020 (aged 53–54) Mumbai, India
- Party: Shiv Sena

Rajendra Devlekar (1966 - 22 September 2020) was a Shiv Sena politician from Thane district, Maharashtra. He served as Mayor of Kalyan-Dombivli Municipal Corporation.

Devlekar was diagnosed with COVID-19 in August 2020, during the COVID-19 pandemic in India. He was moved to Mumbai for more intensive treatment after his health deteriorated. He later succumbed to the disease. He is survived by his wife and two daughters.

== Positions held ==
- 2010: Elected as corporator in Kalyan-Dombivli Municipal Corporation
- 2015: Re-elected as corporator in Kalyan-Dombivli Municipal Corporation
- 2015: Elected as Mayor of Kalyan-Dombivli Municipal Corporation
