= Kalyan-Dombivli =

- Twin City; Mumbai Metropolitan Region
- Location within Maharashtra
- Coordinates: 19°14′N 73°8′E
- Country: India
- State: Maharashtra
- District: Thane

Government
  - Type: Municipal Corporation
  - Body: Kalyan-Dombivli Municipal Corporation
  - Mayor: Harshali Chaudhari ( SHS)
  - Deputy Mayor: Rahul Damle (BJP)
  - Municipal Commissioner & Administrator: Mr.Abhinay Goyal

Area
  - Total: 137.15 km^{2} (52.95 sq mi)

Population (2011)
  - Total: 1,246,381
  - Density: 9,087.7/km^{2} (23,537/sq mi)

Languages
  - Official: Marathi
- Time zone: UTC+5:30 (IST)
- Vehicle registration: MH-05
- Website: kdmc.gov.in

Kalyan-Dombivli is a twin city and it comes under Mumbai Metropolitan Region and it is a municipal corporation with its headquarters located in Kalyan in Thane district in the Indian state of Maharashtra. It was formed in 1982 to administer the twin townships of Kalyan and Dombivli. Kalyan has a history of over 700 years. Kalyan is also a major Railway Junction for the trains operating in Central Railway.

In 2016, the government of India announced five cities of Maharashtra state for the Smart Cities project. Kalyan-Dombivli is one of them. The other four cities are Aurangabad, Nashik, Nagpur, and Thane.

== Demographics ==
Historical population
Year	Pop.	±% p.a.
1901	10,749	—
1911	12,600	+1.60%
1921	17,829	+3.53%
1931	26,291	+3.96%
1941	31,356	+1.78%
1951	67,006	+7.89%
1961	104,981	+4.59%
1971	178,404	+5.45%
1981	343,167	+6.76%
1991	1,014,557	+11.45%
2001	1,193,512	+1.64%
2011	1,247,327	+0.44%
Source: Government of India

Religion in Kalyan-Dombivli (2011)
Religion	Percent
Hinduism	80.75%
Buddhism	7.28%
Islam	6.76%
Jainism	2.67%
Christianity	2.12%
Other or not stated	0.43%

As of the 2011 census official report, Kalyan-Dombivli Municipal Corporation had 302,735 households and a population of 1,247,327. 121,122 (9.71%) were under the age of 7. Kalyan-Dombivli had a sex ratio of 920 females per 1000 males and a literacy rate of 91.37% for those 7 years and above. Scheduled Castes and Scheduled Tribes made up 121,897 (9.77%) and 36,864 (2.96%) of the population respectively. Kalyan-Dombivli is also considered one of the fastest developing city after Navi Mumbai.

Languages of Kalyan-Dombvili (2011)
1. Marathi (60.5%)
2. Hindi (15.3%)
3. Gujarati (5.10%)
4. Urdu (3.56%)
5. Malayalam (2.95%)
6. Tamil (1.95%)
7. Kannada (1.82%)
8. Bhojpuri (1.46%)
9. Kutchi (1.29%)
10. Marwari (1.08%)
11. Telugu (0.96%)
12. Bengali (0.95%)
13. Others (4.08%)

At the time of the 2011 Census of India in the residual district, 59.50% of the population in the district spoke Marathi, 15.30% Hindi, 5.10% Gujarati, 3.56% Urdu, 2.95% Malayalam, 1.95% Tamil, 1.82% Kannada, 1.46% Bhojpuri, 1.29% Kutchi, 1.08% Marwari, 0.96% Telugu and 0.95% Bengali as their first language.
