= Dombivli =

City in Maharashtra, India

- City
- Nickname: tolly
- Interactive map of Dombivli
- Coordinates: 19.218433°N 73.086718°E
- Country: India
- State: Maharashtra
- District: Thane
- Taluka: Kalyan

Government
  - Type: Municipal Corporation
  - Body: Kalyan-Dombivli Municipal Corporation
  - Mayor: Vinita Rane (Shiv Sena)
  - Deputy Mayor: Upeksha Bhoir (BJP)
- Demonym: Dombivlikar

Languages
  - Official: Marathi
- Time zone: UTC+5:30 (IST)
- PIN CODE: 421201,421202,421203,421204
- Vehicle registration: MH-05
- Sex ratio: 917 females/1000 males ♂/♀
- Literacy Rate: 93.06%
- Lok Sabha constituency: Kalyan
- Vidhan Sabha constituency: Dombivli, Kalyan Rural
- Civic agency: Kalyan-Dombivli Municipal Corporation
- Website: www.kdmc.gov.in

Dombivli (pronunciation: [ɖoːmbiʋliː]) city located on the banks of Ulhas River in Thane district of Maharashtra, India. One of the busiest railway stations of the Central Railway, Dombivli railway station makes Dombivli an important transportation hub. This city is also a cultural hub and an economically developing city, along with its larger counterpart, Kalyan. In 2016, the government announced Kalyan-Dombivli as one of five Maharashtra cities for the Smart Cities project. Dombivli and Kalyan have a literacy rate of 93%, one of the highest in the state of Maharashtra. It is the center of Mumbai.

== Geography ==
Dombivli is located at 19.218433°N 73.086718°E. It has an average elevation of 13.534 meters (44.403 feet). The land here is rough and rocky by nature. The Ulhas river flows from its north. The Arabian sea is about 50 km west from Dombivli.

The climate is warm and humid. The rains are extremely heavy during the months of July and August. The average annual temperature is 26.7 °C (80.1 °F). During the summer, days are hot and highly humid, reaching temperatures of 35 °C (95 °F). During the months of April–May 2026, the El nino effect caused high temperatures hitting 42 °C (107.6 °F).

== Transportation ==
Dombivli is served by the Mumbai Suburban railway network, i.e., it lies on the main line of the central section of Mumbai suburban railway network. Built in 1886, it is one of the busiest stations on the Central line and witnesses a footfall of more than 300 thousand commuters daily. Though none of the long-journey express trains halt here, it is well connected to Mumbai and Navi Mumbai through Thane. Though, during rush hours, the station is an unacceptably over-crowded affair.

== See also ==
- Kalyan-Dombivli
- Kalyan-Dombivli Municipal Corporation
