= Vithalwadi =

- Town
- Location within Maharashtra
- Coordinates: 19°13′43″N 73°8′54″E
- Country: India
- State: Maharashtra
- District: Thane

Government
  - Body: KDMC

Languages
  - Official: Marathi
- Time zone: UTC+5:30 (IST)
- Postal code: 421306
- Vehicle registration: MH-05
- Nearest city: Kalyan, India

Vithalwadi is a town in the Taluka of Kalyan Thane district.

Vithalwadi is between Kalyan and Ulhasnagar.

== Transport ==
Vithalwadi railway station is on the Central Line of the Mumbai Suburban Railway There is a state transport (ST) bus depot next to it.
