= Kasara =

- census town
- Location in Maharashtra, India
- Coordinates: 19°38′45″N 73°28′30″E
- Country: India
- State: Maharashtra
- District: Thane
- Elevation: 308 m (1,010 ft)

Population (2011)
  - Total: 15,611

Language
  - Official: Marathi
- Time zone: UTC+5:30 (IST)
- PIN: 421 602
- Telephone code: 02527
- Vehicle registration: MH-04

Kasara is a census town in the Thane district of Maharashtra, India. The town is located on the busy Mumbai–Nashik route, which is one of the four major routes that lead into Mumbai. Kasara is served by a railway station on the Mumbai Suburban Railway, and is the final stop in the north-east sector of the Central Line and important railway station. That is for abbreviation for Kasara Local is set as "N" means North side Local's Last Station. Town is also known for the winding Thal Ghat or better known as Kasara Ghats.

One of India's longest road tunnels is located in Kasara. It connects Igatpuri and Kasara under the Nagpur Mumbai Super Communication Expressway (NMSCE), also known as Samruddhi Mahamarg. The tunnel is 7.7 km long which makes it the longest road tunnel in Maharashtra.

== Demographics ==
As of 2011 India census, Kasara had a population of 15,611. Males constitute 51% of the population and females 49%. Kasara has an average literacy rate of 63%, lower than the national average of 76.5%: male literacy is 73%, and female literacy is 52%. In Kasara, 15% of the population is under 6 years of age.
