= Titwala =

Titwala Titvala
- Suburban
- Nickname: Titwaleshwar
- Location in Maharashtra, India Titwala (India)
- Coordinates: 19.295428°N 73.207694°E
- Country: India
- State: Maharashtra
- District: Thane
- Established: Pre Historic Period
- Elevation: 7.5 m (25 ft)

Population (2001)
  - Total: 26,331

Official
  - Language: Marathi
- Time zone: UTC+5:30 (IST)
- PIN: 421 605
- Telephone code: 0251
- Vehicle registration: MH-05

Titwala (Titvala) ( Pronounced: /tɪtˈvɑːlə/) is a town near Kalyan in the Indian state of Maharashtra, Located in Thane District. Titwala is famous for the Siddhivinayak Mahaganapati Temple, where lakhs of devotees visit this temple to take auspicious blessings of Lord Ganesha during the auspicious days of Ganesh Chaturthi and Angarki Sankashti Chaturthi.

== Temples ==
- Siddhivinayak Mahaganapati Temple

It is the site of a temple of Ganesha and purportedly the hermitage where Shakuntala was born.

The Siddhivinayak Mahaganapati Temple is located at Titwala. The day of 'Angarki Sankashti Chaturthi', a holy day in the Hindu Calendar, attracts large crowds. Titwala attracts visitors from the suburbs of Mumbai. Believers claim that if Mahaganapati is worshiped regularly, marriages of those wanting to be united can be arranged and that conflicts between husband and wife can end and those that desire a son or daughter, will have one born to them.
