= Shahad =

- town
- Location within Maharashtra
- Coordinates: 19°14′38″N 73°09′59″E
- Country: India
- State: Maharashtra
- District: Thane

Languages
  - Official: Marathi
- Time zone: UTC+5:30 (IST)

Shahad is a town in the Thane district in Maharashtra state in India. It is located 60 km from Mumbai. Shahad's Pin code is 421103 and postal head office is Shahad.
