= Kalyan =

City in Maharashtra, India

- City; Mumbai Metropolitan Region
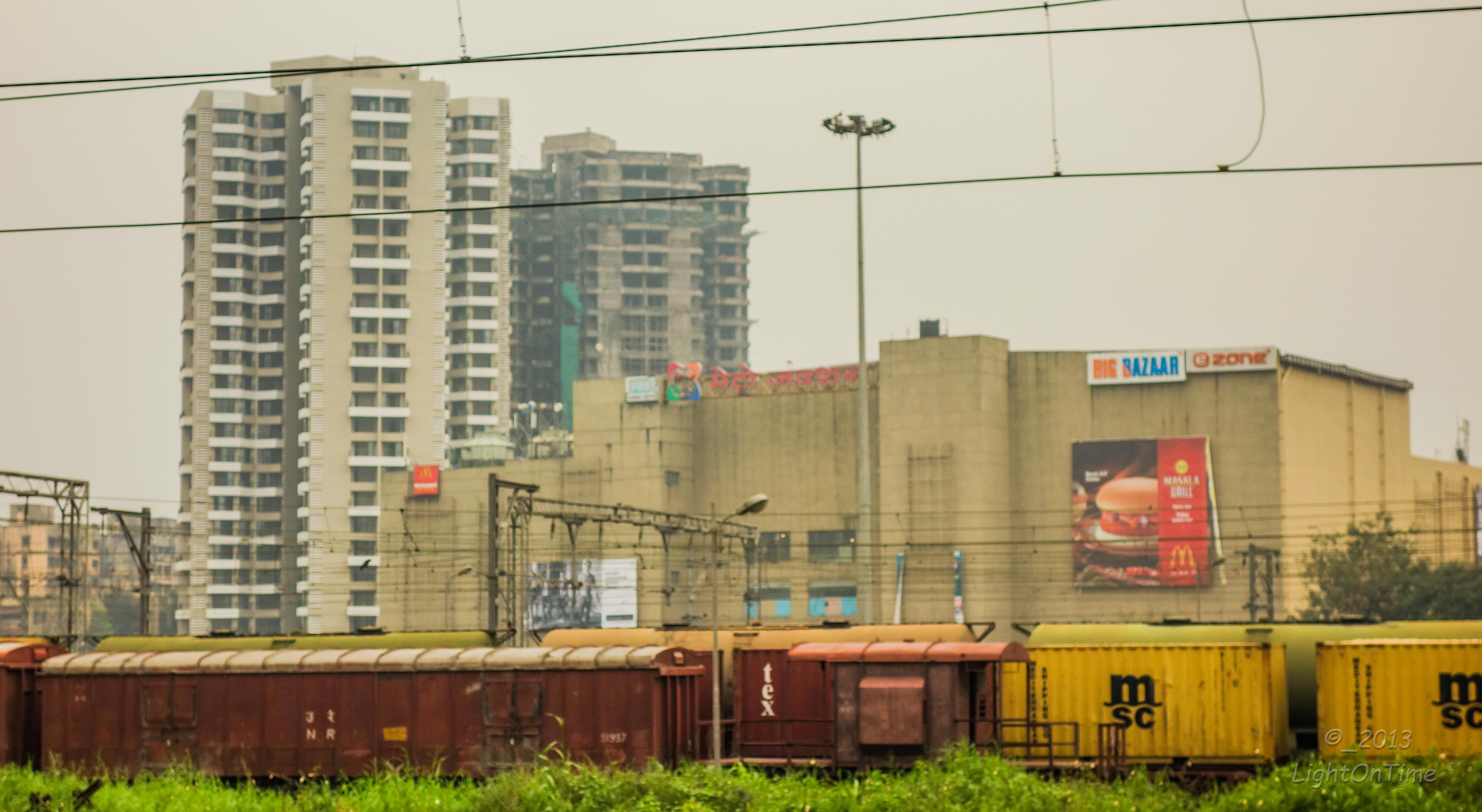

- Location in Maharashtra, India Kalyan (India)
- Coordinates: 19.24°N 73.13°E
- Country: India
- State: Maharashtra
- District: Thane

Government
  - Type: Municipal Corporation
  - Body: Kalyan-Dombivali Municipal Corporation
  - Mayor: Harshali Chaudhari-Thavil (Shiv Sena)
  - Municipal Commissioner: Shri Abhinav Goel (IAS)
  - Deputy Mayor: Rahul Damle (Bharatiya Janata Party)

Area
  - Total: 137.15 km^{2} (52.95 sq mi)
- Elevation: 8.84 m (29.0 ft)

Population (2011)
  - Total: 1,246,381 (with Dombivli)
  - Rank: 29th
  - Density: 9,087.7/km^{2} (23,537/sq mi)
- Demonym: Kalyankar

Languages
  - Official: Marathi
- Time zone: UTC+5:30 (IST)
- PIN CODE: 421301(Kalyan (West)) 421304 (Kalyan (S.O.)) 421306 (Kalyan (East))
- Vehicle registration: MH-05
- Sex ratio: 917 females/1000 males ♂/♀
- Literacy Rate: 93.06%
- Lok Sabha constituency: Kalyan which covers Kalyan East & Kalyan Rural Vidhansabha Constituencies, Bhiwandi Loksabha Constituency which covers Kalyan West Vidhansabha Constituency
- Vidhan Sabha constituency: Kalyan East, Kalyan West, Kalyan Rural
- Civic agency: Kalyan-Dombivli Municipal Corporation

Kalyan (Pronunciation: [kəljaːɳ]) is a city on the banks of Ulhas River in Thane district of Maharashtra state in Konkan division. It is governed by Kalyan-Dombivli Municipal Corporation. Kalyan is a subdivision (Taluka) of Thane district. Kalyan and its neighbouring township of Dombivli jointly form Kalyan-Dombivli Municipal Corporation, abbreviated as KDMC. It is a founding city of the Mumbai Metropolitan Region.

== History ==
Kalyan served as an important port in Classical India. Records of its existence as a port in the region have been found in ancient Greek manuscripts, particularly in Periplus of the Erythraean Sea. However, Kalyan is not mentioned in Ptolemy's Geography (c. 150 CE).

Cosmas Indicopletus, a 6th century Byzantine traveller, records the presence of a bishop in the city administering to the local Christians adhering to the Church of the East who is appointed by the Patriarch of Ctesiphon. This see was captured by the Portuguese for the Catholic Church following the Synod of Diamper.

The city has remains from the Mughal Empire, Sultanate of Bijapur, and the Maratha Empire. The Durgadi fort, first constructed under Mughal rule, is one such example.

== Demographics ==
The majority of Kalyan citizens are Hindus and Muslims.

== Business ==
Kalyan is an important commercial centre in the eastern part of the Mumbai Metropolitan Region (MMR). Owing to its strategic location on the Central Railway and its connectivity to Mumbai, Thane and Navi Mumbai, the city has developed a diverse economy comprising wholesale trade, logistics, retail, healthcare, education, financial services and small-scale manufacturing.

The city has also witnessed significant residential and infrastructure growth as part of the wider development of the Mumbai Metropolitan Region. Planning initiatives have identified the Kalyan area as an important regional growth centre with the objective of supporting employment, business activity and urban infrastructure.

== Climate ==
Kalyan is characterized by koppen classification Aw (tropical monsoon), with high rainfall during the monsoon season and dry season year around. Because of Kalyan's proximity to the sea, it experiences greater diurnal temperature variations, especially during winter, when on some days the average high would reach 34 °C, with average lows near 14-15 °C. Kalyan's humidity is also lower than Mumbai during the winter season and pre-summer (March–April) though it has seen high dew points, particularly in the month of May, with near to 30 °C dew points. Kalyan receives heavy rainfall during June–September.

Climate data for Kalyan
Month	Jan	Feb	Mar	Apr	May	Jun	Jul	Aug	Sep	Oct	Nov	Dec	Year
Mean daily maximum °C (°F)	29.3 (84.7)	33.7 (92.7)	34.6 (94.3)	35.7 (96.3)	34.7 (94.5)	31.9 (89.4)	29.8 (85.6)	29.3 (84.7)	30.1 (86.2)	32.9 (91.2)	33.4 (92.1)	32.0 (89.6)	32.3 (90.1)
Mean daily minimum °C (°F)	14.6 (58.3)	16.3 (61.3)	19.6 (67.3)	25.7 (78.3)	26.1 (79.0)	25.8 (78.4)	24.8 (76.6)	24.5 (76.1)	24.0 (75.2)	23.1 (73.6)	20.5 (68.9)	18.2 (64.8)	21.9 (71.5)
Average precipitation mm (inches)	2.3 (0.09)	1.0 (0.04)	0.8 (0.03)	1.8 (0.07)	13.5 (0.53)	432.6 (17.03)	946.1 (37.25)	553.3 (21.78)	294.1 (11.58)	87.1 (3.43)	20.6 (0.81)	2.1 (0.08)	2,355.3 (92.72)
Source: Government of Maharashtra

== Transport ==
Kalyan Junction railway station is on the railway line between Mumbai and Karjat/Kasara. Kalyan has access to four railway stations on the Central line - Thakurli Station, Vitthalwadi, Shahad Station and Kalyan Junction. Kalyan Junction serves as an important railway station for the people in and around Mumbai. Apart from the railway network, Kalyan-Dombivali Municipal Transport(KDMT) operates an extensive bus network connecting different parts of the city and other neighboring regions. Additionally, auto-rickshaws and share-taxis are widely available outside the railway station and across the city for last-mile connectivity.

== Civic amenities ==
With a population of more than 700,000, Kalyan is a part of the Kalyan-Dombivli Municipal Corporation established in 1983, with municipalities of Kalyan, Dombivli, Ambernath and 81 other villages.

== Government ==
KDMC is a municipal corporation in Thane district of Maharashtra State, India. The municipal corporation was formed in 1983 to administer the twin townships of Kalyan and Dombivli. The municipal corporation has a population 15,18,762 citizens as per the 2011 census. Due to its highly educated population, it is often called the second cultural capital of Maharashtra after Pune.

The corporation is governed by Bombay Provincial Municipal Corporation Act 1949. The following authorities are given charge to implement the provisions of the act:

- A corporation
- A standing committee
- A Education Committee
- A Women and Child welfare committee
- Ward committees
- Municipal commissioner

Both the cities are divided into 122 wards. Municipal Corporation consists of Councillors elected directly at Ward Elections. The number and boundaries of the Wards into which the city is divided is specified by the State Election Commissioner. There are five Councillors nominated by the corporation. As per the provisions of the Act, the total number of Councillors is 121. The Corporation elects one of its members as the Mayor and another to be the Deputy Mayor.

=== Municipal finance ===
According to financial data published on the CityFinance Portal of the Ministry of Housing and Urban Affairs, the Kalyan–Dombivli Municipal Corporation reported total revenue receipts of ₹1,247 crore (US$150 million) and total expenditure of ₹1,195 crore (US$143 million) in 2022–23. Tax revenue accounted for about 39.1% of the total revenue, while the corporation received ₹298 crore in grants during the financial year.

== Gallery ==
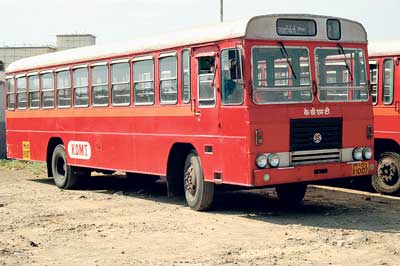
KDMT Buses

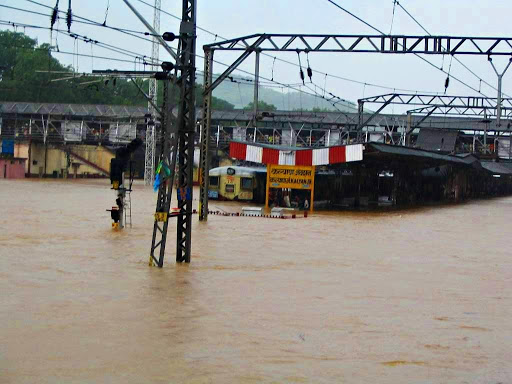
Kalyan Junction during the 26 July 2005 floods

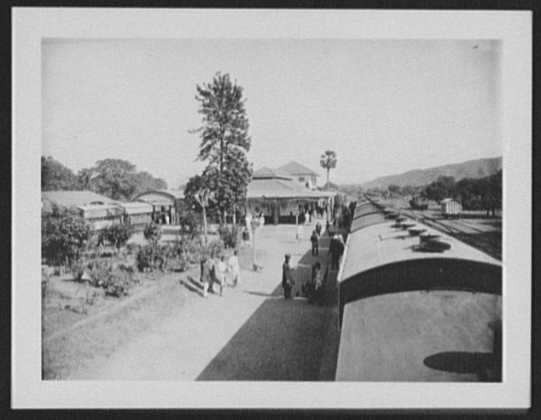
Kalyan Junction

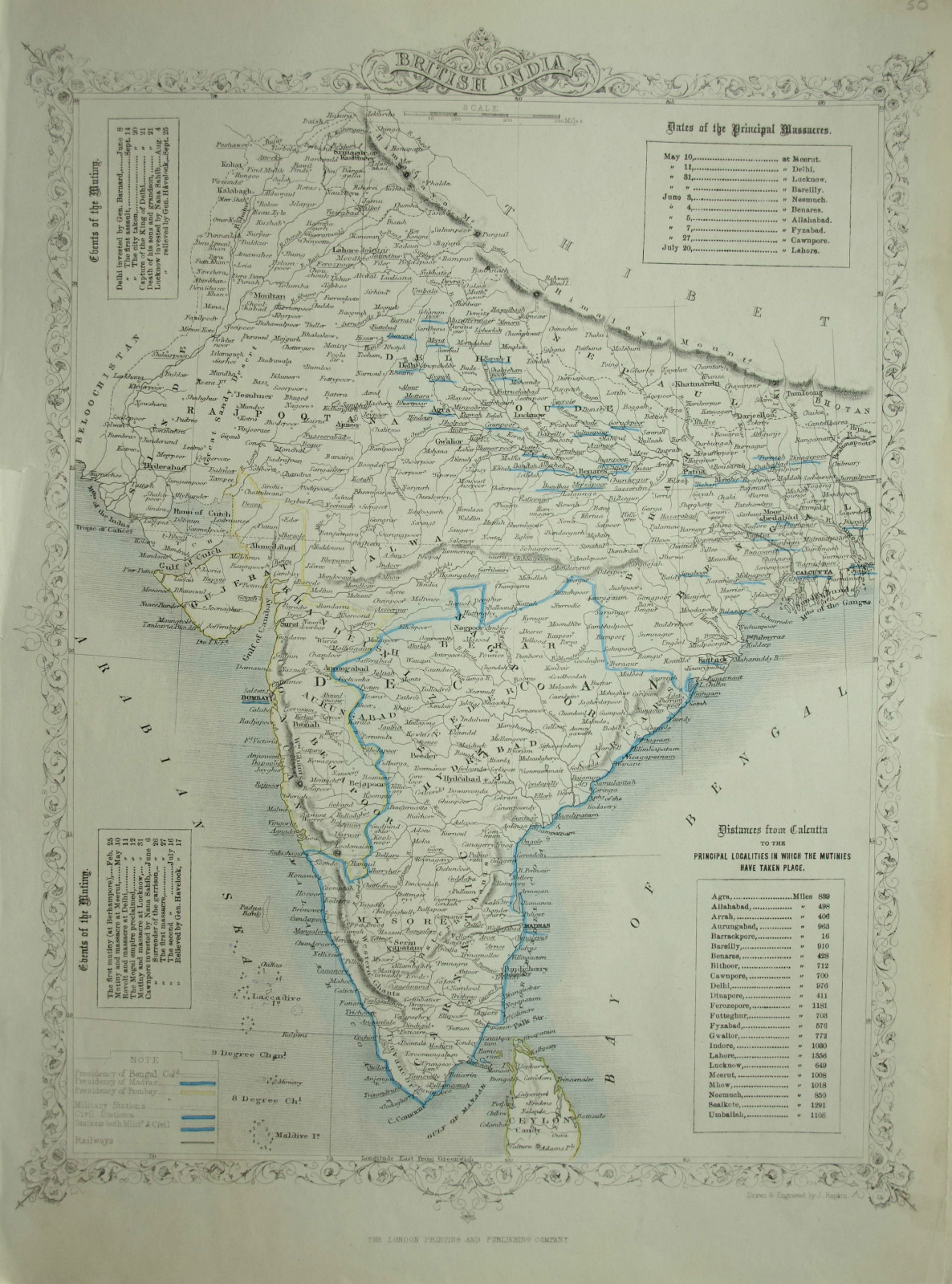
A post 1857 map by John Tallis focused on the events of the Rebellion. The author spells Kalyan as "KALYAN LANJA"/"Calliannee".

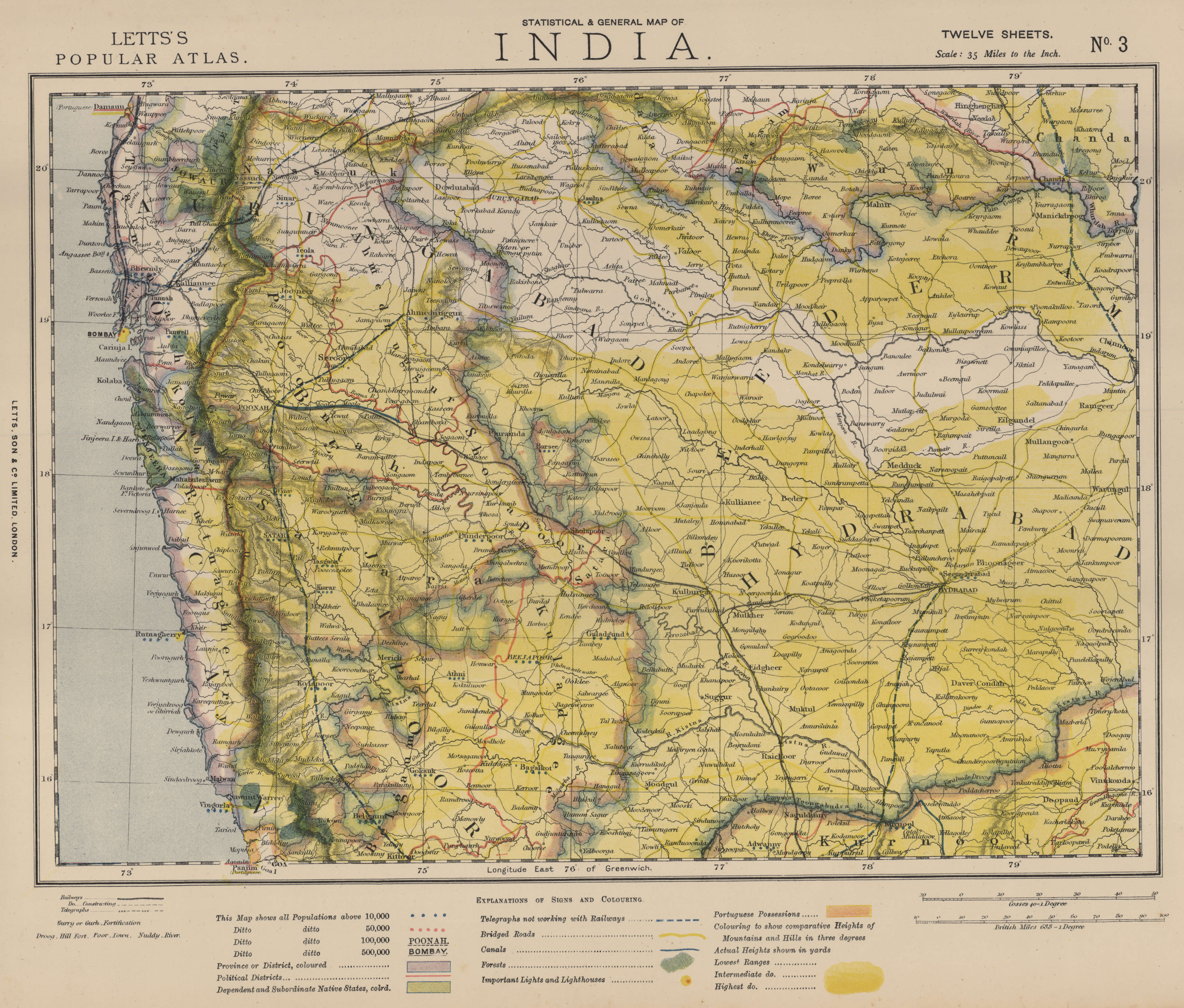
Letts's Popular Atlas, 1883 (Letts & Co., London), Spelled "Kalliannee".

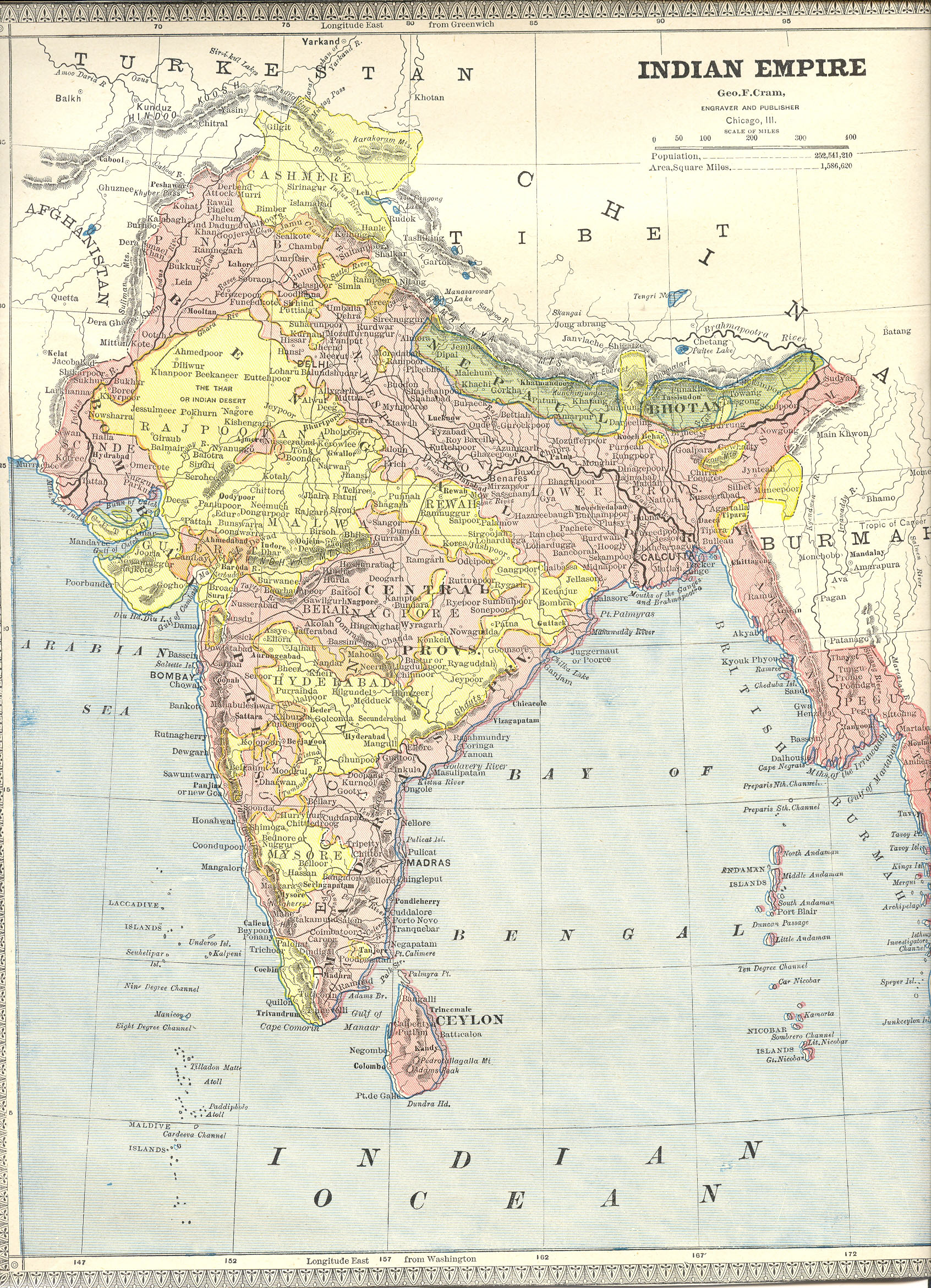
Cram atlas map, 1885. Spelled as "Callian".

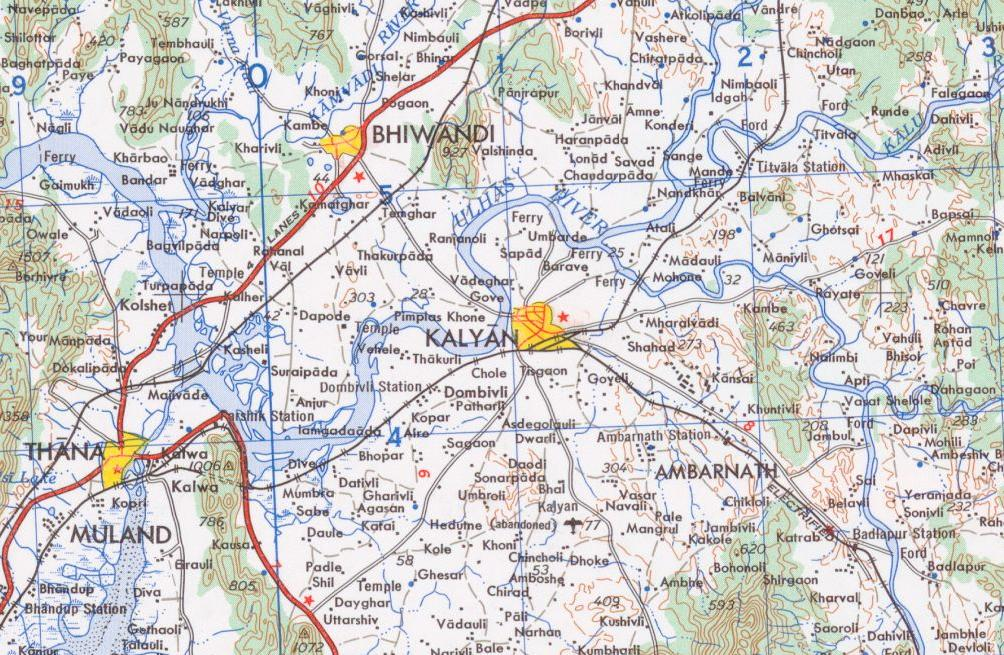
A documented map of Kalyan area 1955 from the US military. Spelled "Kalyan".

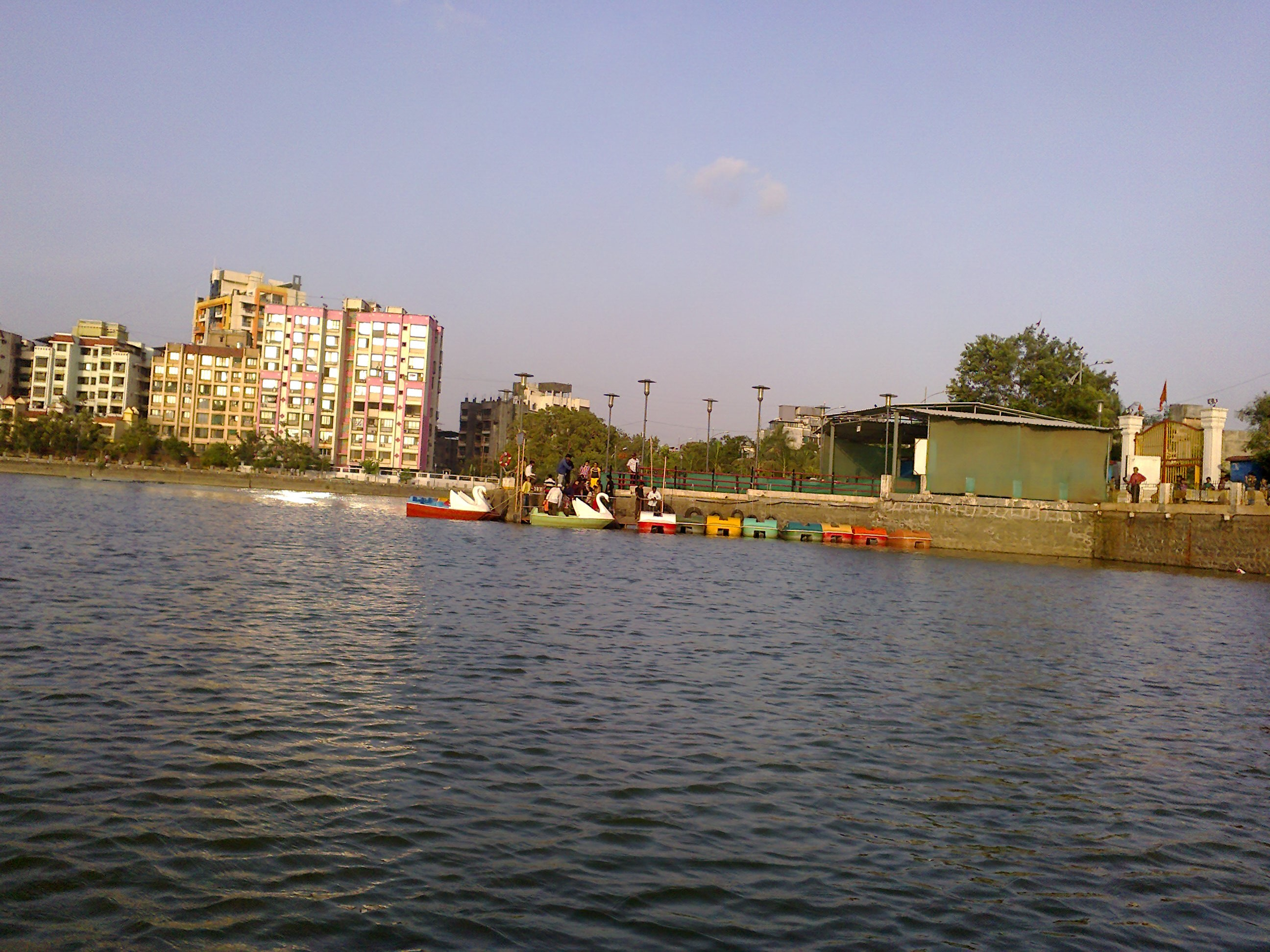
Kala Talao, a historic lake

== Notable people ==
- Vishwanath Bhoir– MLA, (Kalyan West)
- Tushar Deshpande – Indian cricketer. (Fast bowler)
- Pranav Dhanawade – Indian cricketer. (Record holder for most runs 1009*)
- Mahi G – rapper
- Ganpat Gaikwad– MLA, BJP (Kalyan East)
- Anandi Gopal Joshi – first Indian female physician
- Gavin Packard – Indian actor
- Pramod Ratan Patil– MLA, MNS (Kalyan Rural)
- Narendra Pawar – Ex-MLA, BJP (Kalyan West)
- Lalit Prabhakar – Indian actor
- Shrikant Shinde – Member of Parliament (Kalyan)
