= Shakuntala Patra-lekhan =

Painting by Raja Ravi Varma

Shakuntala Patralekhan
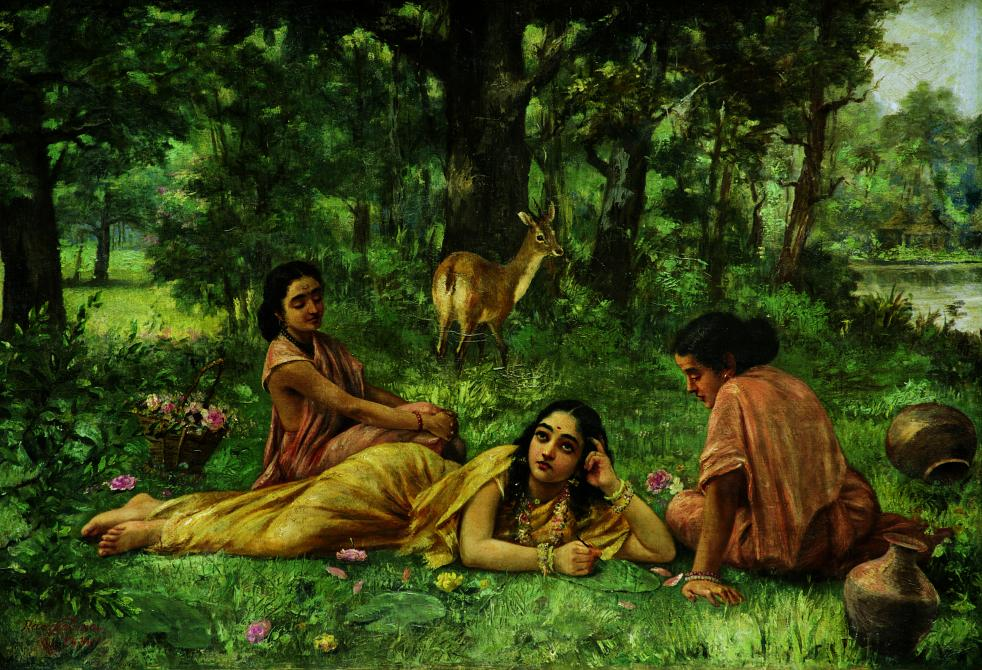
- Artist: Raja Ravi Varma
- Year: 1876
- Type: Oil on Canvas

Shakuntala Patra-lekhan is an 1876 painting by Raja Ravi Varma. The work depicts Shakuntala laying on grass, writing a letter to her lover Dushyanta. The work had won praise for Ravi Varma when it was presented at the Madras Fine Arts Exhibition of 1876. Later acquired by the Duke of Buckingham, the painting was subsequently used in the English translation of Kalidasa's Shakuntalam.

== See also ==
- There Comes Papa
- Nair Lady Adnoring Her Hair
