= Radha in the Moonlight =

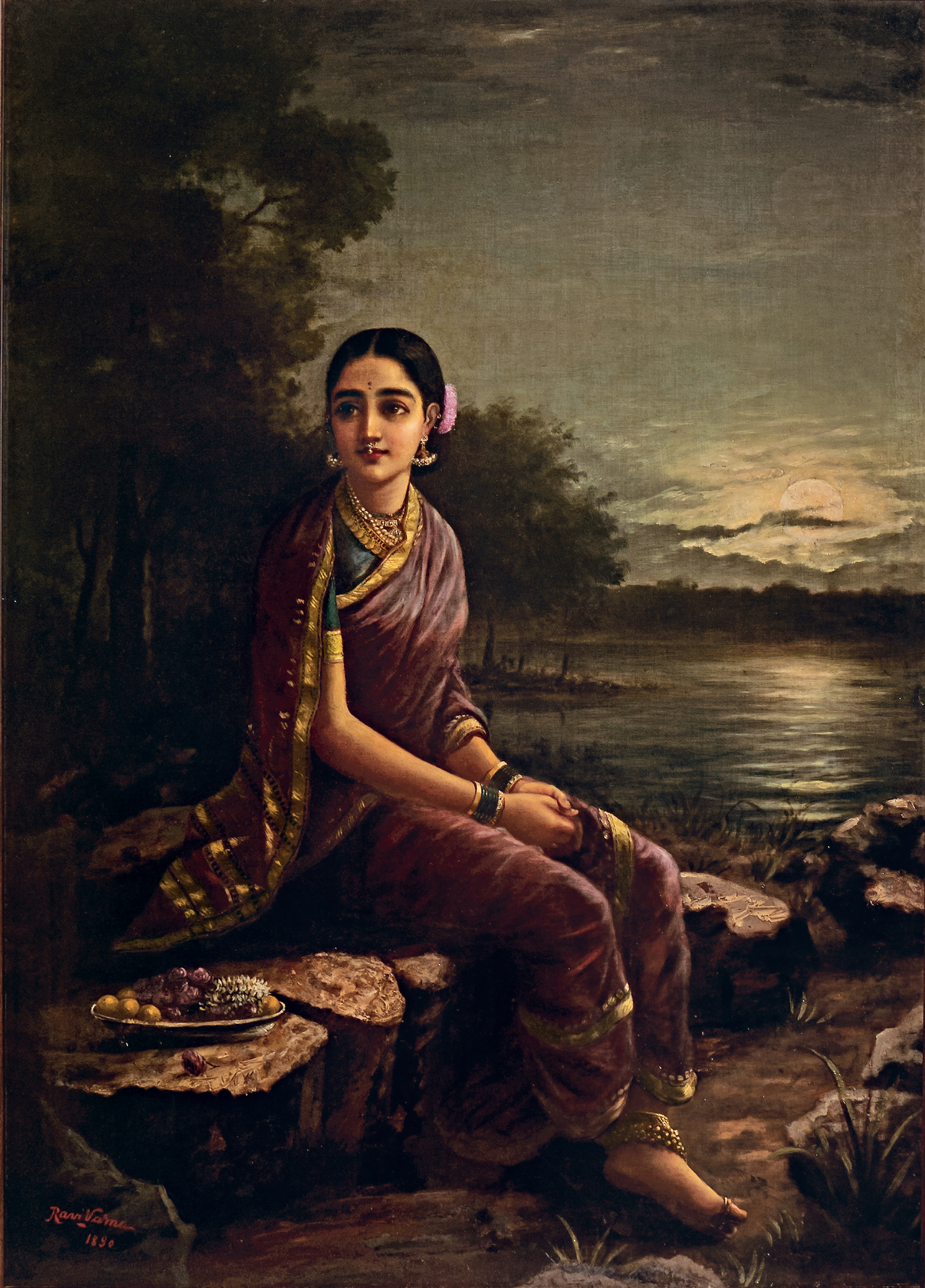
- Artist: Raja Ravi Varma
- Year: 1890
- Type: Oil on Canvas

Radha in the Moonlight was a painting by an Indian artist Raja Ravi Varma, painted in the year 1890.

== Description ==
Radha in the Moonlight is an oil painting by Raja Ravi Varma, created in 1890. The painting depicts Radha sitting beside shimmering water under moonlight, symbolising the blend of human and divine love associated with Radha and Krishna. Radha is portrayed as an idealising figure of beauty, grace and sensitivity reflecting the concept of the "uttam nayika" in classic Indian literature. Radha has the pooja thali, the platter of flower, and sweetmeat near her, the ritual of worship and adulation to be completed before the love play starts.

== See also ==
- Galaxy of Musicians
- Shakuntala
