= The Maharastrian Lady =

1893 oil painting by Raja Ravi Verma

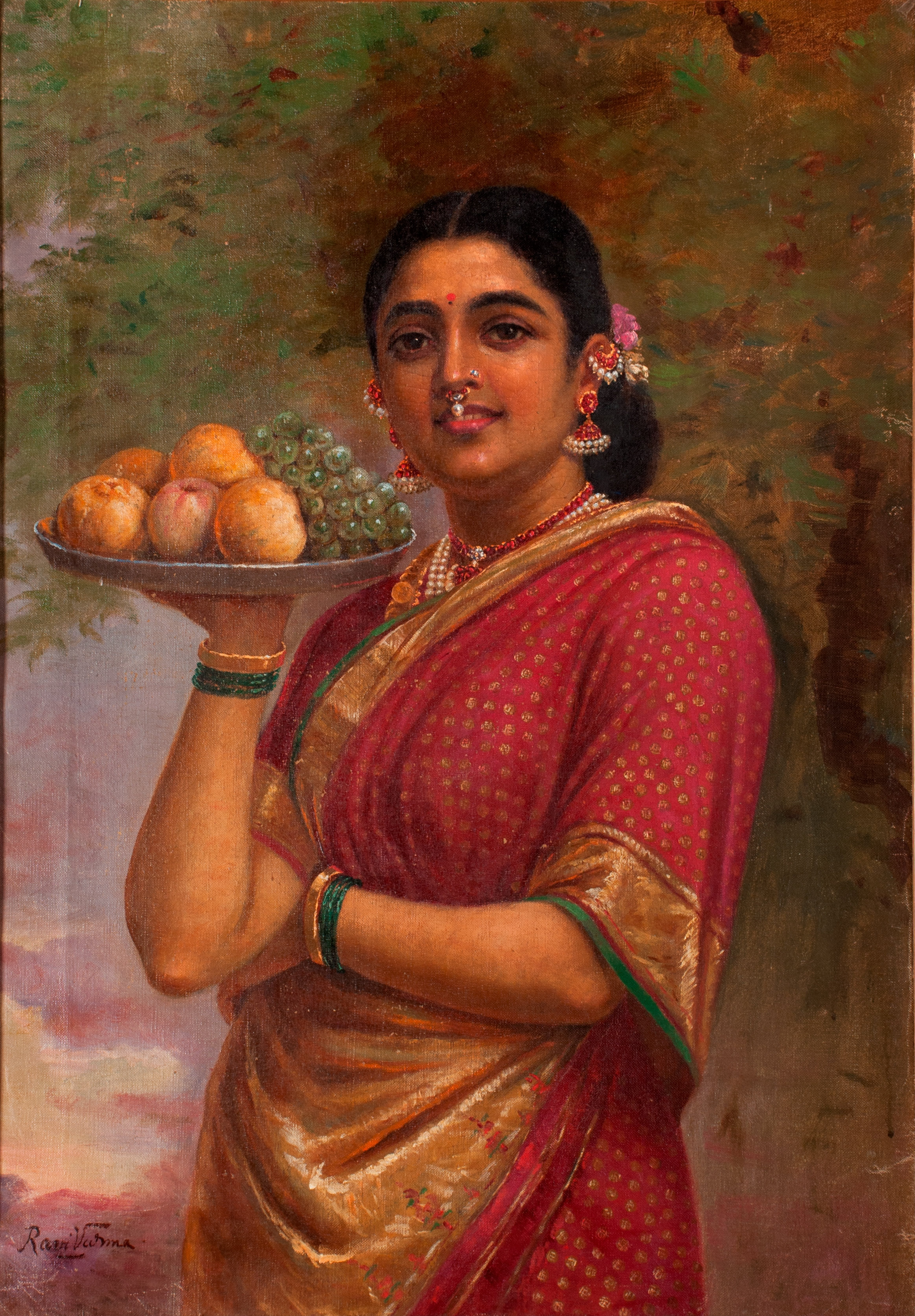
- Artist: Raja Ravi Varma
- Year: 1893
- Type: Oil on Canvas
- Dimensions: 71 cm × 50 cm (27.9 in × 19.6 in)

"The Maharastrian Lady" is an oil painting by an Indian artist, Raja Ravi Verma, painted in the year 1893.

== Description ==
The Maharashtrian Lady is an oil-on-canvas painting by Raja Ravi Varma, created in 1893. It depicts an unidentified Maharashtrian woman dressed in a traditional red, gold, and green sari, holding a tray of fruit. The painting exemplifies Varma's realistic style and his portrayal of Indian women in regional attire. It later served as the model for the chromolithograph Madri, published by the Ravi Varma Press, as the artist associated the figure with Madri, the queen from the Mahabharata, who is described as a beautiful woman clad in crimson silk.

== See also ==
- There Comes Papa
- Shakuntala
- Galaxy of Musicians
