= Mangala Bayi =

Indian artist

Mangala Bayi

Mangala Bayi Thampuratti (1865–1954), known as Mangala Bayi, was an artist from Kerala, India, whose portraits depicted primarily domestic and devotional themes in everyday life in Travancore. She belonged to the Travancore royal family, and her brother, Raja Ravi Verma, was also a renowned Indian painter.

== Life ==
Mangala Bayi was born into the Travancore royal family in Kerala, India, in the erstwhile princely state of Travancore.

== Career ==
Mangala Bayi's brother, Raja Raja Varma, and her aunts, Rohininal Thampuratty and Moolamnal Kunjikāvu, were among the first to adopt art as a profession within the Travancore royal family, training with British artists. Raja Raja Varma trained Mangala Bayi and her brothers, Raja Ravi Varma, and C. Raja Raja Varma, in Western techniques and styles of painting, particularly in portraiture. Mangala Bayi demonstrated a particular talent for portraiture, and a painting of her brother, Raja Ravi Varma, is still on display in the Sree Chitra Art Gallery in Thiruvananthapuram.

Unlike her brother, Mangala Bayi's ability to work professionally in the field of art was constrained by social customs governing the conduct of women. She worked on some private paintings, but primarily assisted her brothers in painting commissions that were given to them, as social mores restricted her from painting professionally. In particular, Mangala Bayi worked on a commission given to Raja Ravi Varma by the former ruler of Gaekwar, spending a year to create fourteen painted illustrations of Hindu deities Radha and Krishna, which would hang in the Durbar Hall of then newly constructed Lakshmi Vilas Palace at Vadodara. Among her surviving independent paintings is a work titled, Charity, which depicts a woman giving food to an impoverished person, as well as a portrait of Mahatma Gandhi, which is part of the collection in the Government Women's College in Thiruvananthapuram. Most of her remaining works survive in private collections.

Details of Mangala Bayi's professional and personal life are accessible through her conversations with Balakrishna Nair, who wrote an autobiography of Raja Ravi Varma for which he interviewed members of his family. In Nair's book, Mangala Bayi describes how her relationship and ability to work with her brothers was constrained after her marriage, as social customs limited her contact with her brothers. She describes how Raja Ravi Varma occasionally sought her opinion on his paintings, and how she, in turn, sought comments on her work when her brothers permitted her to speak. Mangala Bayi continued to paint until the age of 84, working primarily in oils. Her work has been praised for her skill in creating realistic depictions of the human form, as well as for her personal, intimate choice of subjects and composition.
