= Raja Ravi Varma =

Indian painter (1848–1906)

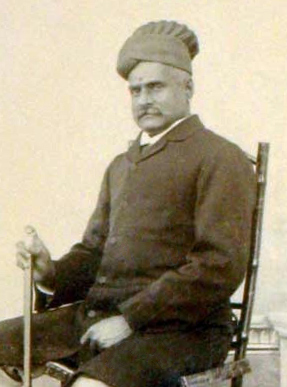
- Varma in the 1890s
- Born: 29 April 1848; Kilimanoor, Travancore (present-day Thiruvananthapuram, Kerala)
- Died: 2 October 1906 (aged 58); Attingal, Travancore, British Raj
- Other names: Koil Thampuran of Kilimanoor, Ravi Varma Koil Thampuran
- Education: University College Thiruvananthapuram
- Occupations: painter, artist
- Notable work: Shakuntala; Shakuntala Patra-lekhan; Nair Lady Adorning Her Hair; There Comes Papa; Galaxy of Musicians
- Spouse: Pooruruttathi Thirunal Bhageerthi Thampuratti
- Awards: Kaisar-i-Hind Gold Medal

Signature
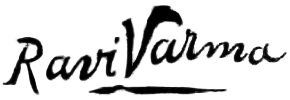

Raja Ravi Varma (Malayalam: [ɾaːd͡ʒaː ɾɐʋi ʋɐrmːɐ]) (29 April 1848 – 2 October 1906) was an Indian painter. His works are one of the best examples of the fusion of European academic art with a purely Indian sensibility and iconography. He greatly enhanced his reach and influence as a painter and public figure by making affordable lithographs of his paintings available to the public. His lithographs increased the involvement of common people with fine arts and defined artistic tastes. His religious depictions of Hindu deities and works from Indian epic poetry and Puranas have received critical acclaim. He was part of the royal family of Parappanad, Malappuram district.

Raja Ravi Varma was closely related to the royal family of Travancore of present-day Kerala state in India. Later in his life, two of his granddaughters were adopted into the royal family.

== Personal life ==
Varma was born on 29 April 1848, as M. R. Ry. Ravi Varma (Malayalam: രവി വർമ്മ), Koil Thampuran of Kilimanoor at Kilimanoor palace in the erstwhile princely state of Travancore (present-day Kerala) into an aristocratic family that for over 200 years produced consorts for the princesses of the matrilineal Travancore royal family. The title Raja was conferred as a personal title by the Viceroy and Governor-General of India Lord Curzon.

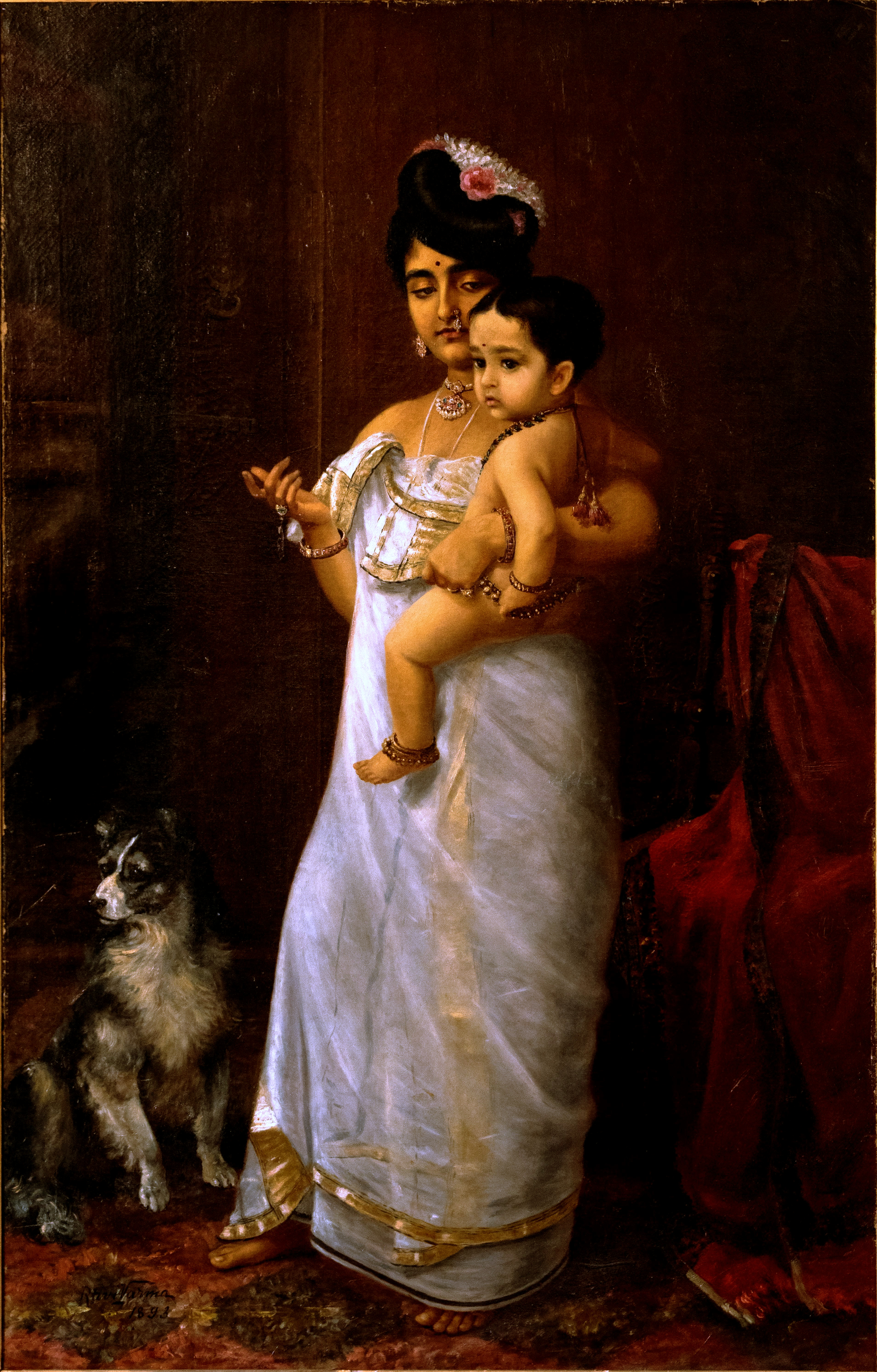
There comes Papa (1893), depicting Varma's daughter Mahaprabha with one of her sons

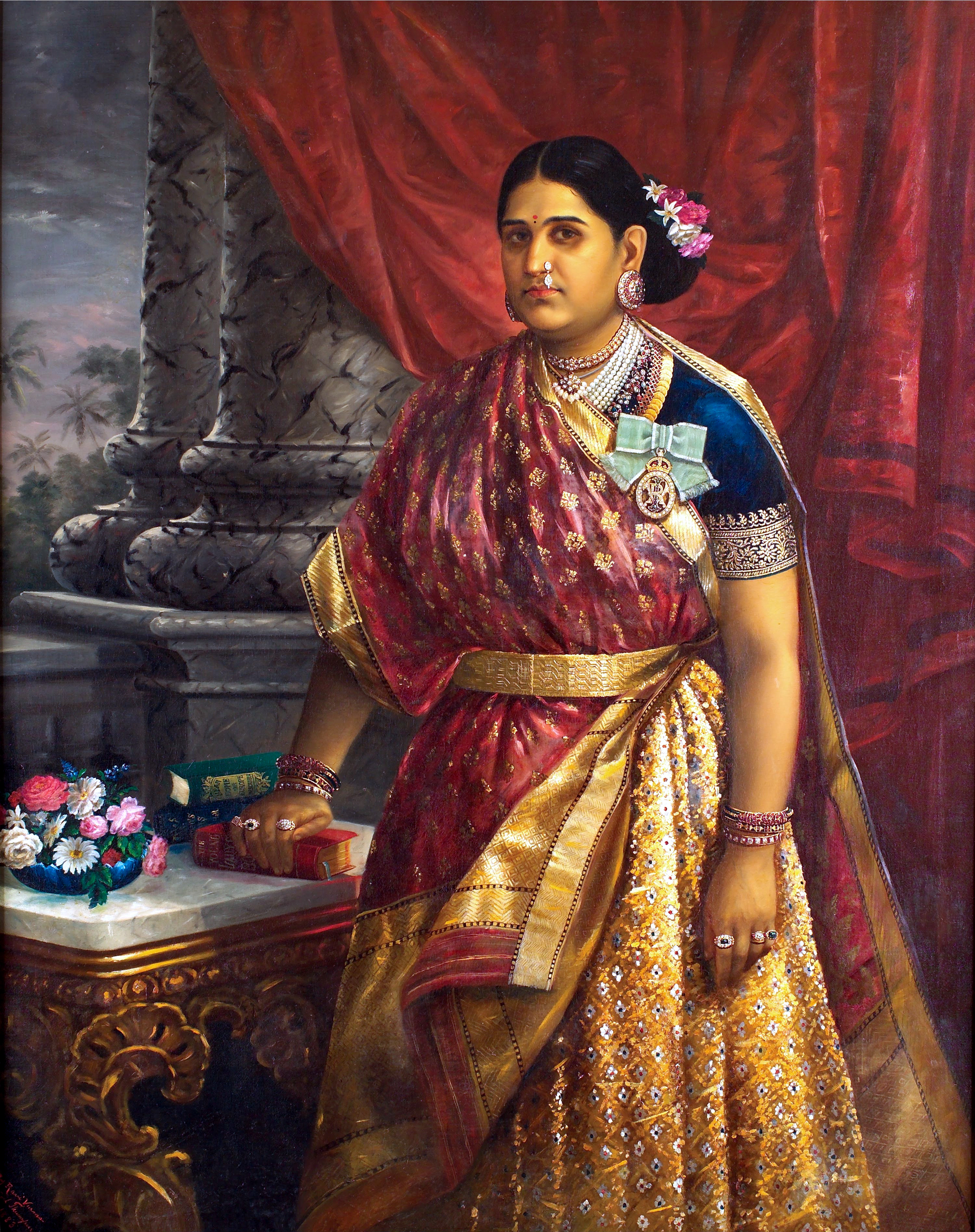
Varma's sister-in-law, Bharani Thirunal Lakshmi Bayi, Senior Rani of Attingal (or Travancore), who adopted Varma's granddaughters in 1900

Ravi Varma was the son of Ezhumavil Neelakanthan Bhattatiripad and Uma Ambabayi Thampurratti. His mother Uma Ambabayi Thampuratty belonged to the baronial family which ruled the Kilimanoor feudal estate within the kingdom of Travancore. She was a poet and writer, and her work Parvati Swayamvaram was published by Varma after her death. Ravi Varma's father was a scholar of Sanskrit and Ayurveda and hailed from the Ernakulam district in Kerala. Ravi Varma had two siblings, a sister named Mangala Bayi and a brother named Raja Varma (born 1860). The last-named was also a painter and worked closely with Ravi Varma all his life.

In 1866, at age 18, Varma was married to 12-year-old Bhageerthi Bayi (known formally as Pooruruttati Nal Bhageerathi Bayi Thampuratty) of the royal house of Mavelikkara, another major fief of Travancore kingdom. Notably, the house of Mavellikara was a branch of the Royal House of Travancore. Bhageerthi was the youngest of three sisters; her two elder siblings were adopted into the royal family of Travancore in 1857 to perpetuate the lineage. Designated the Senior and Junior Rani of Attingal, their descendants were vested with the succession to the throne of Travancore. Therefore, Ravi Varma's connection to the royal family became very close due to his marriage with Bhageerthi. His children would be royal by birth, since they belonged to their mother's family. The marriage, which was arranged by the parents in the proper Indian manner, was considered successful. The couple had five children, two sons, and three daughters. Their elder son, Kerala Varma (b.1876) was of an excessively spiritual temperament. He never married and eventually renounced the world, leaving home for good in 1912. The younger son, Rama Varma (born 1879), inherited his father's artistic talent and studied at the JJ School of Arts, Mumbai. He was married to Gowri Kunjamma, sister of Dewan PGN Unnithan, and became the father of seven children.

The three daughters of Ravi Varma and Bhageerthi Bayi were Mahaprabha Amma (who features in two of Varma's most famous paintings), Uma Amma (named after Varma's mother) and Cheria Kochamma. In 1900 CE, the Royal House of Travancore once again faced a succession crisis. Bhageerthi's two elder sisters, who had been adopted in order to carry forward the lineage, had failed to produce the desired heirs. They had six children between them, but only two of those survived, and both were boys (who also, incidentally, later died childless). According to the matrilineal Marumakkathayam system, the succession to the throne could only progress through females, and therefore it was necessary to make an adoption. Tradition dictated that two girls belonging to branches of the Royal Family be adopted together. They would be designated the Senior and Junior Rani of Attingal, and the succession to the throne of Travancore would be vested in their progeny, in accordance with the unusual and unique Marumakkathayam system of succession.

Two of Varma's granddaughters were marked by destiny to receive this honour, the main reason being that they were the nearest matrilineal (cognatic) kin to the incumbent Rani of Attingal. In August 1900, Mahaprabha's eldest daughter Lakshmi Bayi (aged 5 years) and Uma's eldest daughter Parvati Bayi (aged 4 years) were adopted into the Royal family of Travancore. It was Bharani Thirunal Lakshmi Bayi, their surviving grand-aunt, who formally adopted them. She died within one year of doing this, and the two girls were then installed as the Senior and Junior Ranis of Attingal respectively. They were married while yet in their early teens to two gentlemen from suitable aristocratic families. It was the Junior Rani, Sethu Parvathi Bayi, who gave birth to the much-awaited heir in 1912, exactly a day after her sixteenth birthday. Incidentally, her husband was a grand-nephew of Raja Ravi Varma and belonged to Kilimanoor. The newborn child was the future Maharaja Chithira Thirunal, the last ruling Maharaja of Travancore. He was followed by a brother (the future Maharaja Marthanda Varma III) and a sister Lakshmi Bayi, the mother of Maharaja Rama Varma VII who is presently on the throne (since 2013). Meanwhile, the Senior Rani (Sethu Lakshmi Bayi, daughter of Mahaprabha Amma, and Regent from 1924 to 1931) also gave birth to two daughters later in life (in 1923 and 1926).

In this way, the entire present (existing) royal family of Travancore is descended from Raja Ravi Varma. Well known among his royal descendants are the writers Aswathi Thirunal Gowri Lakshmi Bayi and Shreekumar Varma, the artist Rukmini Varma and the classical musician Aswathi Thirunal Rama Varma.

Around Ravi Varma's 57th birthday he announced his decision to accept Sanyasa, and retire from all worldly life when he turned 60. In his final years he suffered from grief for the death of Raja Raja Varma, and also from diabetes, which contributed to his death on 2 October 1906.

== Art career ==
Varma was patronised by Ayilyam Thirunal, the next Maharaja of Travancore and began formal training thereafter. He learned the basics of painting in Madurai. Later, he was trained in water painting by Rama Swami Naidu and rather reluctantly in oil painting by British portraitist Theodore Jenson.

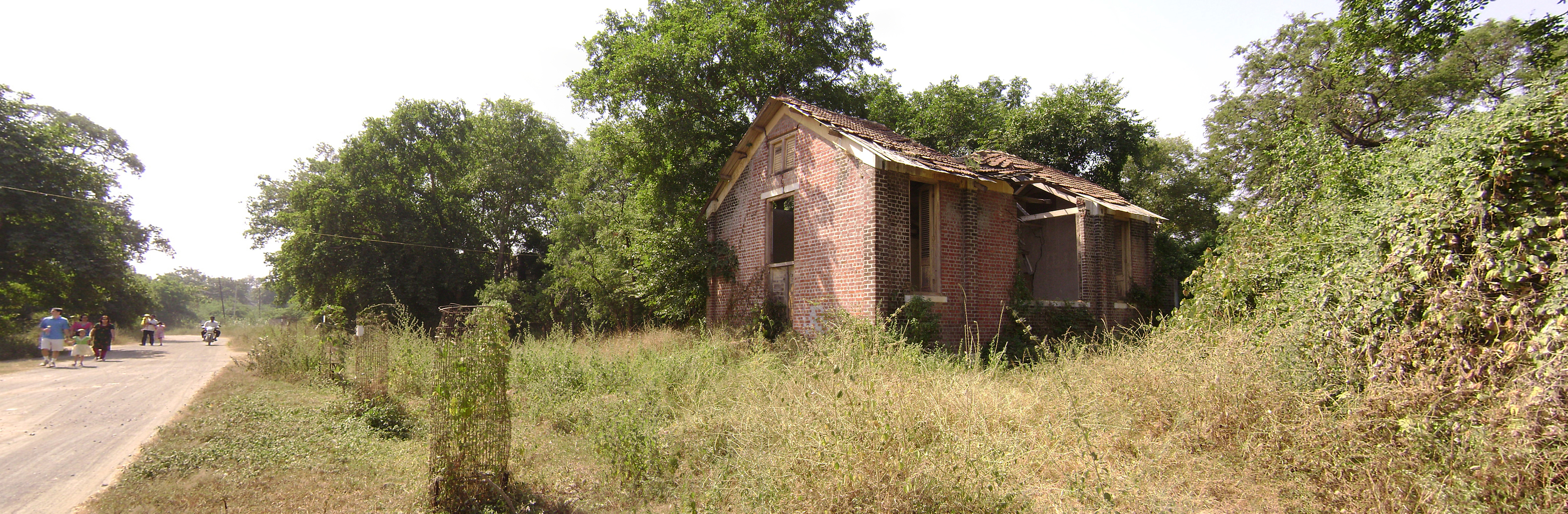
The studio used by Varma during his stay at the Laxmi Vilas Palace

The British administrator, Edgar Thurston was significant in promoting the careers of Varma and his brother. Varma received widespread acclaim after he won an award for an exhibition of his paintings at Vienna in 1873. Varma's paintings were also sent to the World's Columbian Exposition held in Chicago in 1893 and he was awarded three gold medals. He travelled throughout India in search of subjects. He often modelled Hindu Goddesses on Indian women, whom he considered beautiful. Ravi Varma is particularly noted for his paintings depicting episodes from the story of Dushyanta and Shakuntala, and Nala and Damayanti, from the Mahabharata. Ravi Varma's representation of Hindu characters has become a part of the Indian imagination of the epics. He is often criticized for being too showy and sentimental in his style but his work remains very popular in India. Many of his fabulous paintings are housed at Laxmi Vilas Palace, Vadodara.

== Raja Ravi Varma Press ==
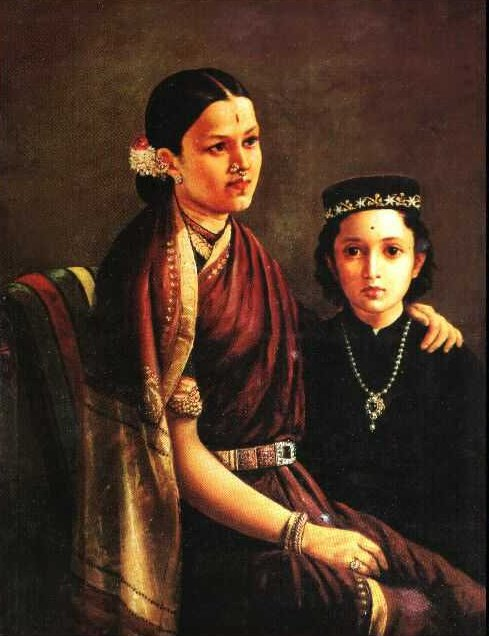
Mrs. Ramanadha Rao and son

Apparently on the advice of the then Dewan (Prime Minister) of Travancore, T. Madhava Rao, Ravi Varma started a lithographic printing press in Ghatkopar, Mumbai in 1894 and later shifted it to Malavli near Lonavala, Maharashtra in 1899. The oleographs produced by the press were mostly of Hindu gods and goddesses in scenes adapted mainly from the Mahabharata, the Ramayana and the Puranas. These oleographs were very popular and continued to be printed in thousands for many years, even after the 1906 death of Ravi Varma.

The Ravi Varma press was the largest and most innovative press in India at that time. The press was managed by Varma's brother, Raja Varma, but under their management, it was a commercial failure. By 1899 the press was deeply in debt and in 1901, the press was sold to his printing technician from Germany, Fritz Schleicher. Schleicher continued to print Ravi Varma's prints but later employed other artists to create new designs. Schleicher also broadened the product of press to include commercial and advertisement labels. Under the management of Schleicher and his successors, the press continued successfully until a devastating fire destroyed the whole factory in 1972. Many of Ravi Varma's original lithographic prints were also lost in the fire.

== Honours ==
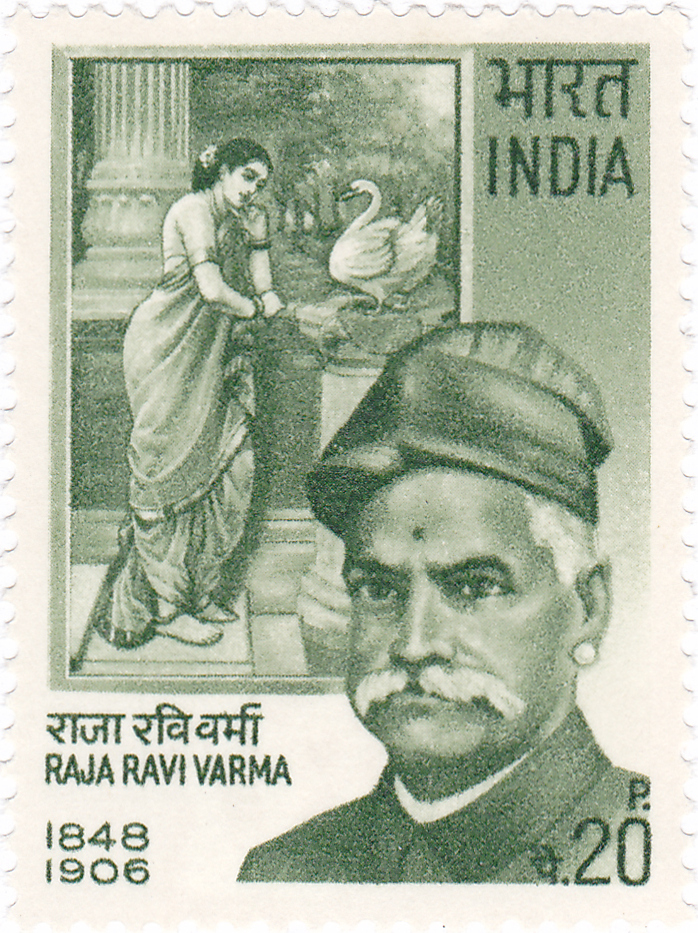
Raja Ravi Varma on a 1971 stamp of India

In 1904, Viceroy Lord Curzon, on behalf of the British King Emperor, bestowed upon Varma the Kaisar-i-Hind Gold Medal. A college dedicated to fine arts was also constituted in his honour at Mavelikara, Kerala. Raja Ravi Varma High at Kilimanoor was named after him and there are many cultural organizations throughout India bearing his name. In 2013, the crater Varma on Mercury was named in his honor. Considering his vast contribution to Indian art, the Government of Kerala has instituted an award called Raja Ravi Varma Puraskaram, which is awarded every year to people who show excellence in the field of art and culture.

- On his 65th death anniversary, India Post issued a commemorative postal stamp depicting Ravi Varma and his famous painting 'Damayanti and Swan'

== Legacy ==
Raja Ravi Varma is sometimes regarded as the first modern Indian artist due to his ability to reconcile Western aesthetics with Indian iconography. The Indian art historian and critic Geeta Kapur wrote,

Ravi Varma is the indisputable father figure of modern Indian art. Naive and ambitious at the same time, he opens up the debate for his later compatriots in the specific matter of defining individual genius through professional acumen, of testing modes of cultural adaptation with idiosyncratic effect, of attempting pictorial narration with its historic scope.

Similarly, Baroda School artist Gulam Mohammed Sheikh also wrote about Ravi Varma as a modern artist. In his essay "Ravi Varma in Baroda", Sheikh asserted that Varma was a key figure in the establishment of Indian modern art, claiming that "the story of contemporary Indian art was never the same after Ravi Varma had entered it. He left his imprint on almost every aspect of it." Like Kapur, Sheikh praised Ravi Varma's integration of Indian and Western aesthetics and techniques, comparing him favorably to Indian modernist Nandalal Bose.

However, Ravi Varma's legacy is controversial. Fellow Baroda School artist and art historian Ratan Parimoo saw Ravi Varma in a less favorable light, derogatorily referring to him as kitsch and claiming Varma's work was less spiritually authentic than folk art and tribal art. He argued that Ravi Varma was responsible for the "vulgarity" of popular art, comparing Varma's work to the lurid colors and sexuality of popular images in calendar art and films. Australian art critic Christopher Allen made the same points in his review of the 2026 exhibition The God of Small Things: Faith and Popular Culture at the Queensland Art Gallery.

Despite his controversial legacy, Ravi Varma continues to be an important figure for modern and contemporary Indian artists. For example, modern artist Nalini Malani recreated Ravi Varma's Galaxy of Musicians in her video installation Unity in Diversity to interrogate Ravi Varma's idealistic nationalism. Similarly, contemporary artist Pushpamala N. recreated several Ravi Varma paintings with herself as the subject to deconstruct Ravi Varma's idealized depictions of goddesses and Indian women.

Many organizations do programs in his memory and give awards in his name. A two days festival of The Maharaja Ranjitsinh Gaekwad Festival of Arts is annually organized, in his memory at the Durbar Hall in Laxmi Vilas Palace, Vadodara, Gujarat. The Raja Ravi Varma Award for Excellence in the Field of Visual Arts is presented during this festival. Jayant Parikh was the first recipient.

== List of major works ==
The following is a list of the prominent works of Ravi Varma. On the anniversary of what would be his 150th birthday, Google Arts & Culture published over 300 of his works online.

- Mohini Playing with a Ball
- Yashoda and Krishna
- Village Belle
- Lady Lost in Thought
- Damayanti Talking to a Swan
- The Orchestra
- Arjuna and Subhadra
- The Heartbroken
- Swarbat Player
- Shakuntala
- Lord Krishna as Ambassador
- Jatayu, a Bird Devotee of Lord Rama Is Mauled by Ravana
- Victory of Indrajit
- The Gypsies of South India (Poverty) (1893)
- A Lady Playing Swarbat
- Lady Giving Alms at the Temple
- Lord Rama Conquers Varuna
- Victory of Meghanada
- Nair Woman
- Romancing Couple
- Draupadi Dreading to Meet Kichaka
- Shantanu and Matsyagandha
- Shakuntala Composing a Love Letter to King Dushyanta
- Girl in Sage Kanwa's Hermitage (Rishi-Kanya)
- Bharani Thirunal Lakshmi Bayi of Travancore
- Sri Shanmukha Subramania Swami
- Woman holding a fan
- The Maharastrian Lady
- 3D painting of The Mysore King on a Horse (now on display at the Mysore Palace)

Sri Cyrus Poonawalla who is the founder and managing director of Serum Institute of India, acquired Ravi Varma's painting, Yashoda and Krishna for 167.2 crore (1,672,000,000) Indian rupees at a Saffronart auction in Delhi on 1 April 2026. The sale at US$17.9 million set an auction record for the work of an Indian artist and surpasses Varma's previous record of US$4.5 million set in 2023.

== Gallery ==
More at Category:Raja Ravi Varma

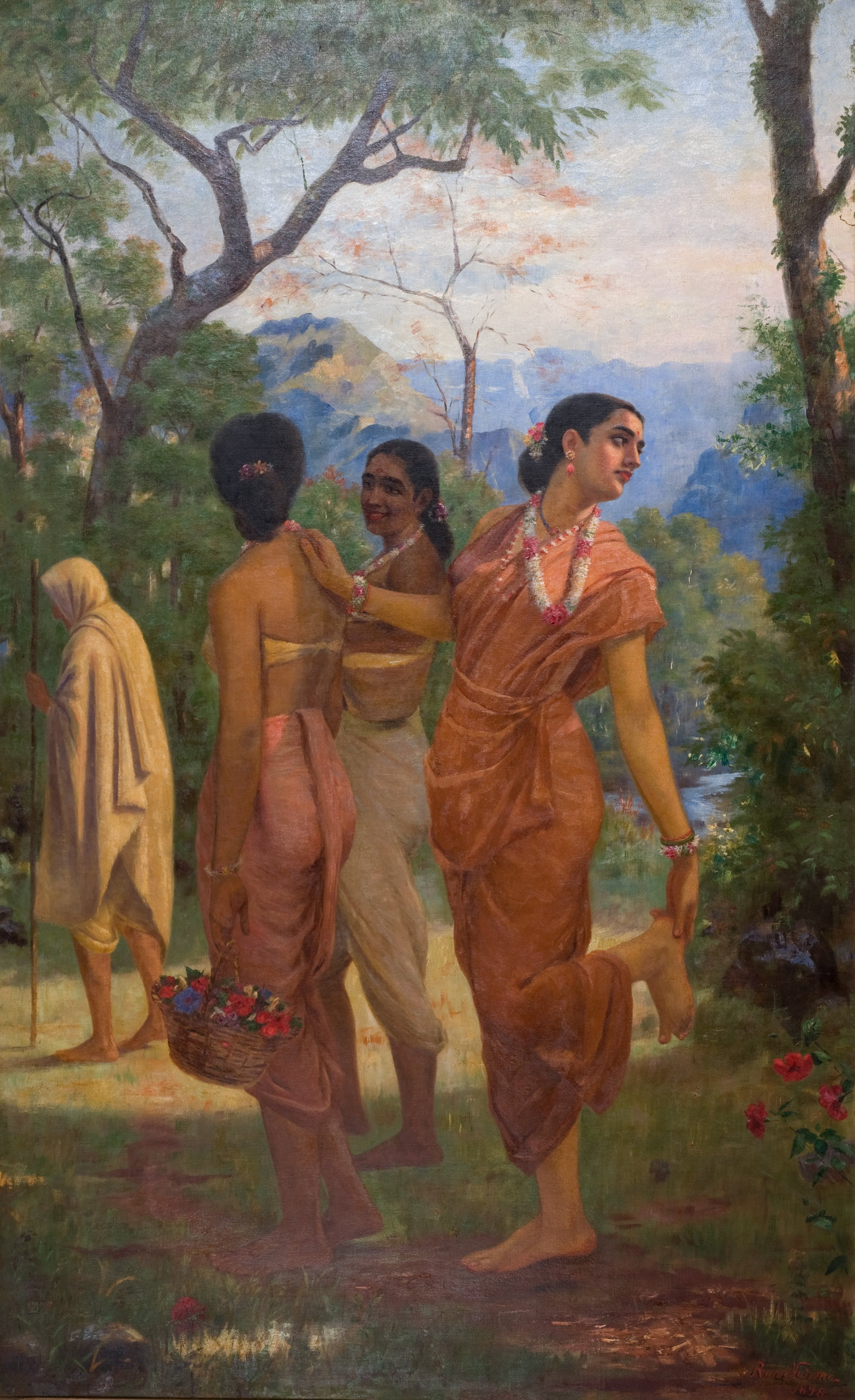
Shakuntala looking for Dushyanta

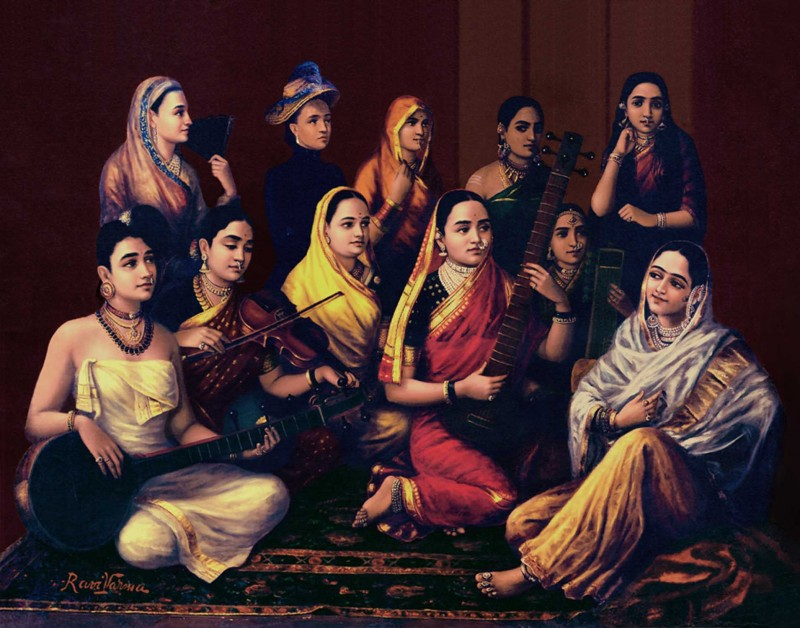
Galaxy of Musicians

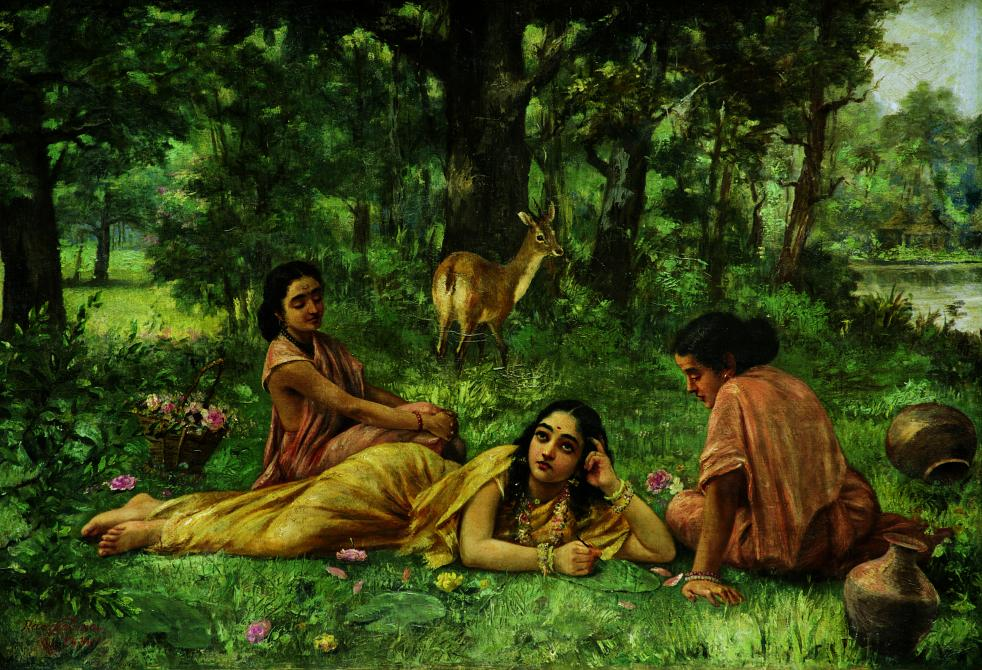
Shakuntala Patra-lekhan

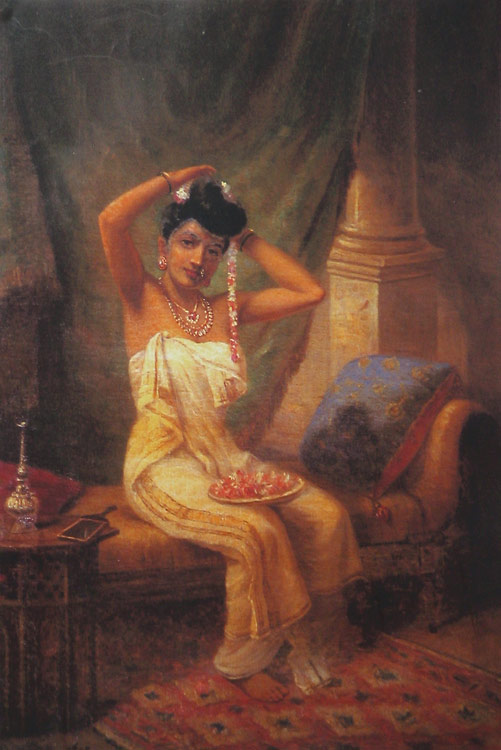
Nair Lady Adorning Her Hair

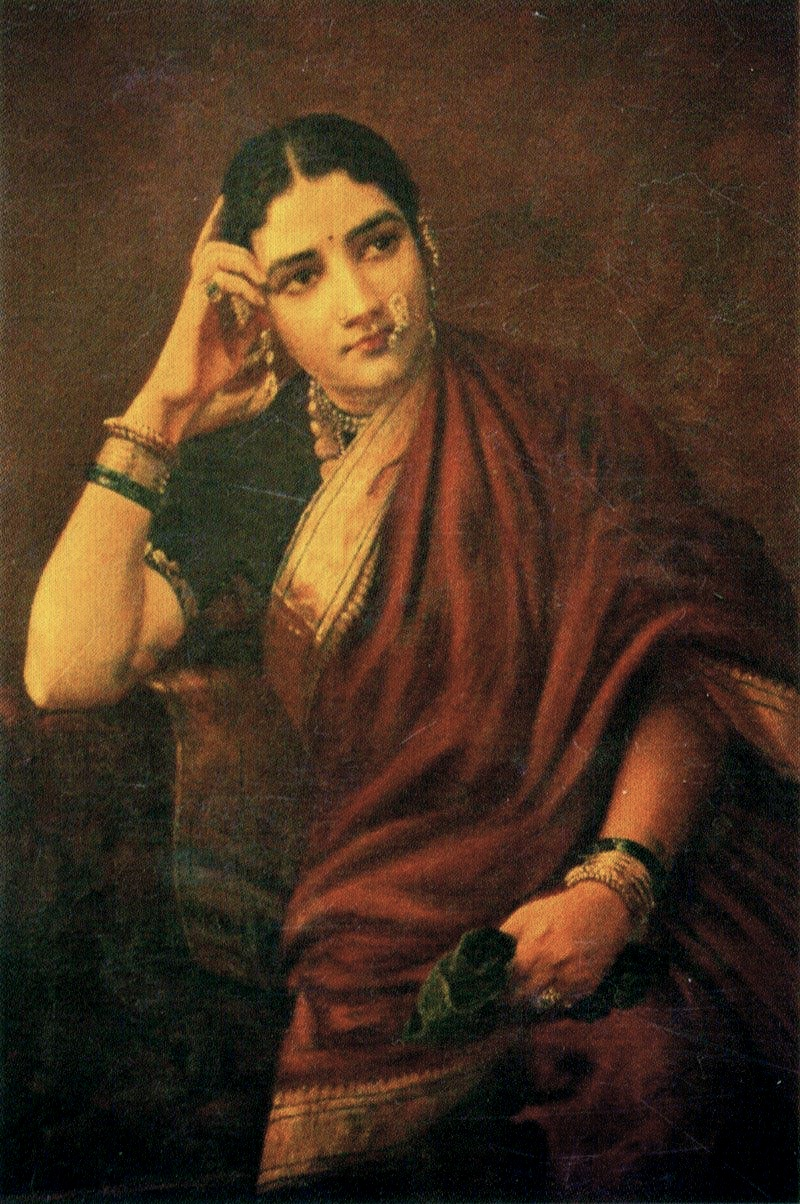
Expectation

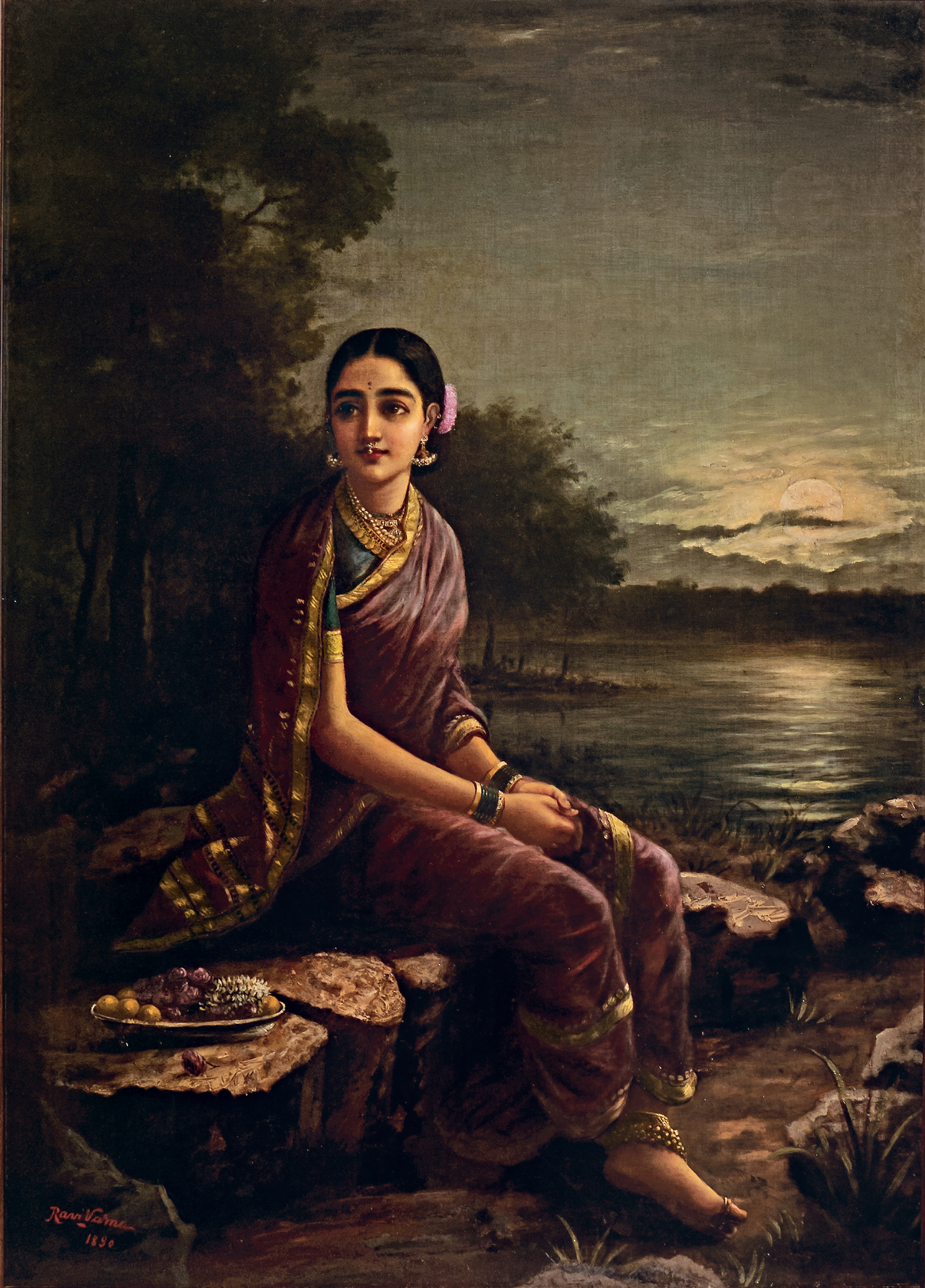
Radha in the Moonlight

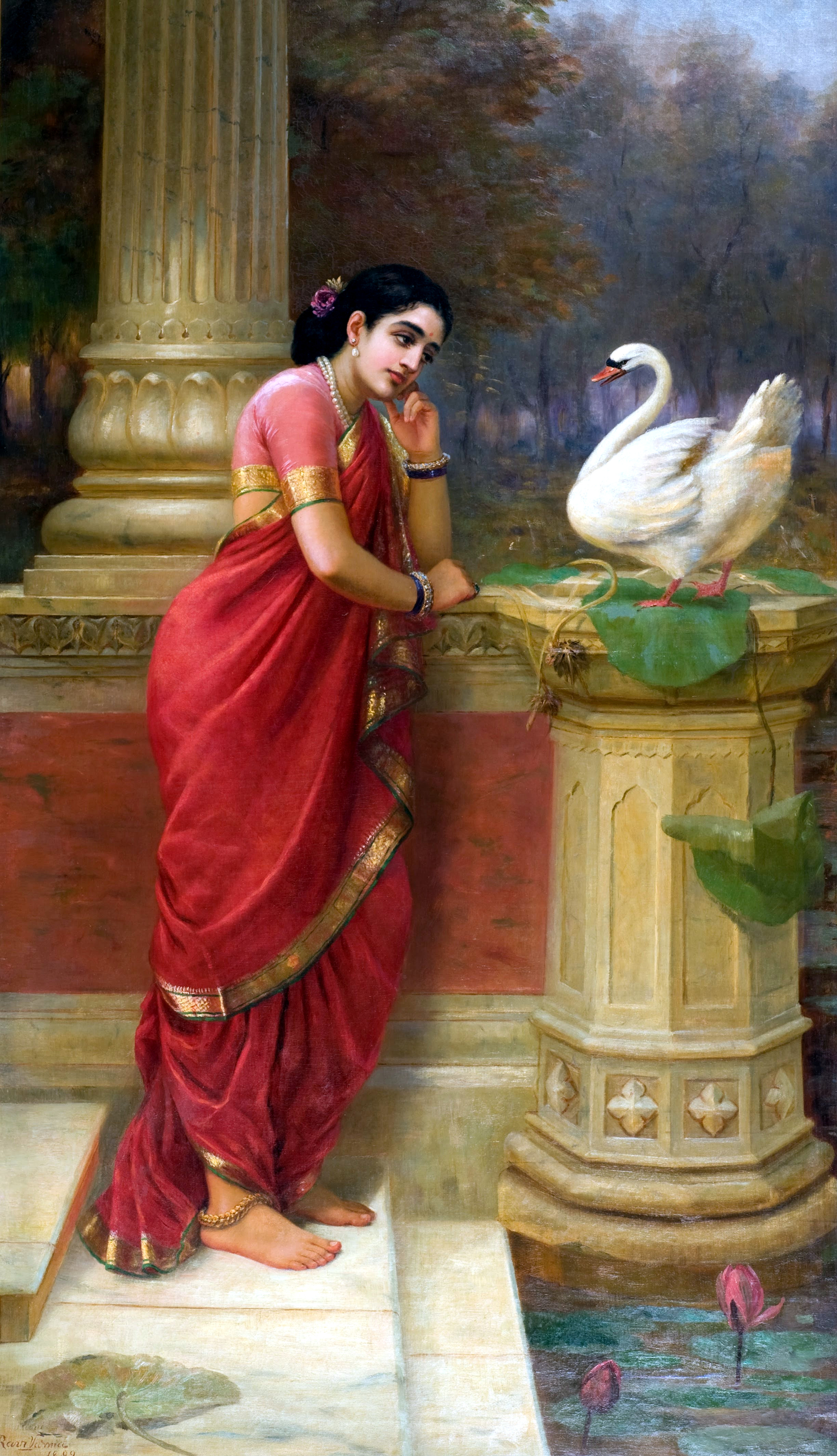
Hamsa Damayanti

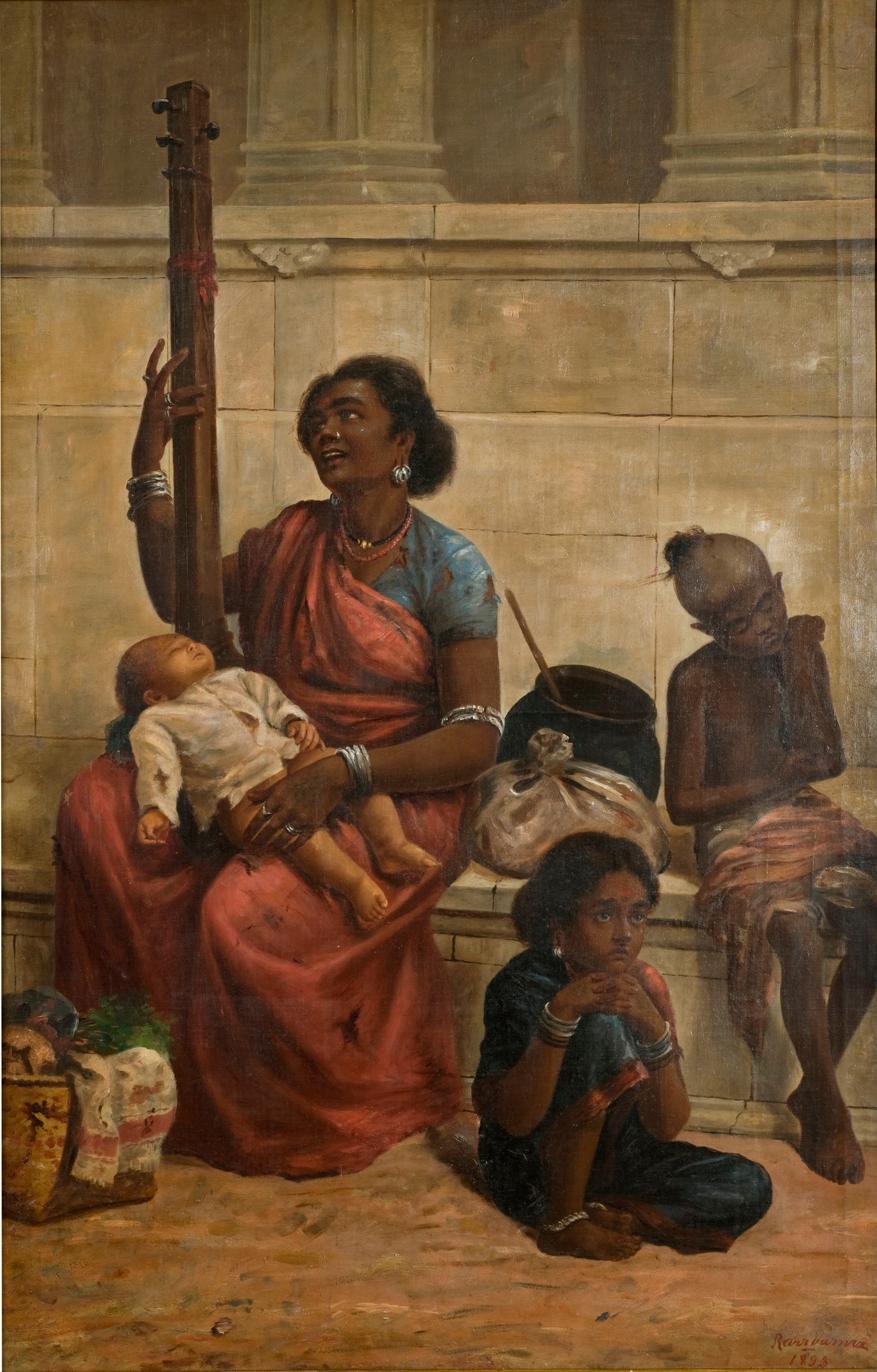
Gypsies

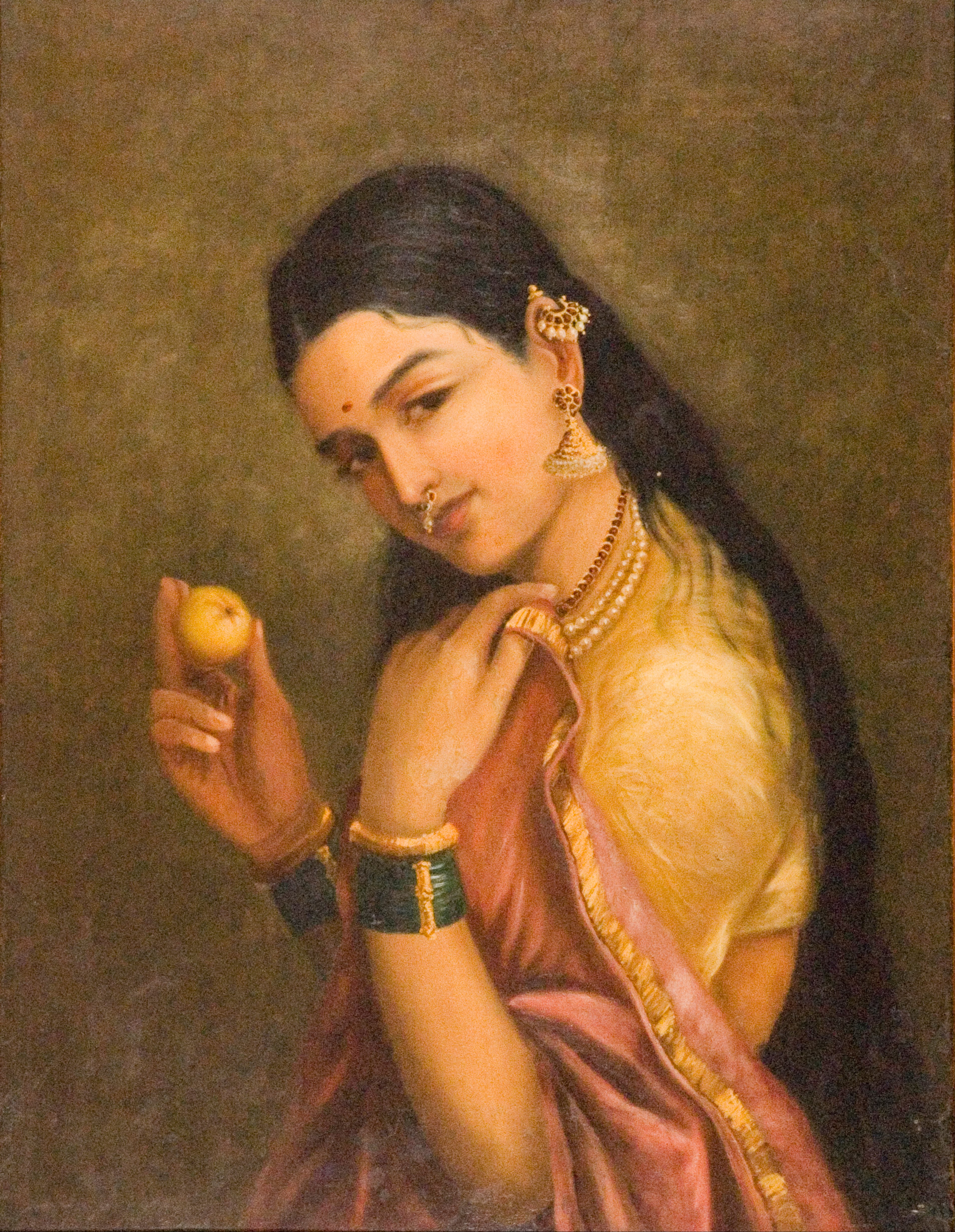
Woman Holding a Fruit

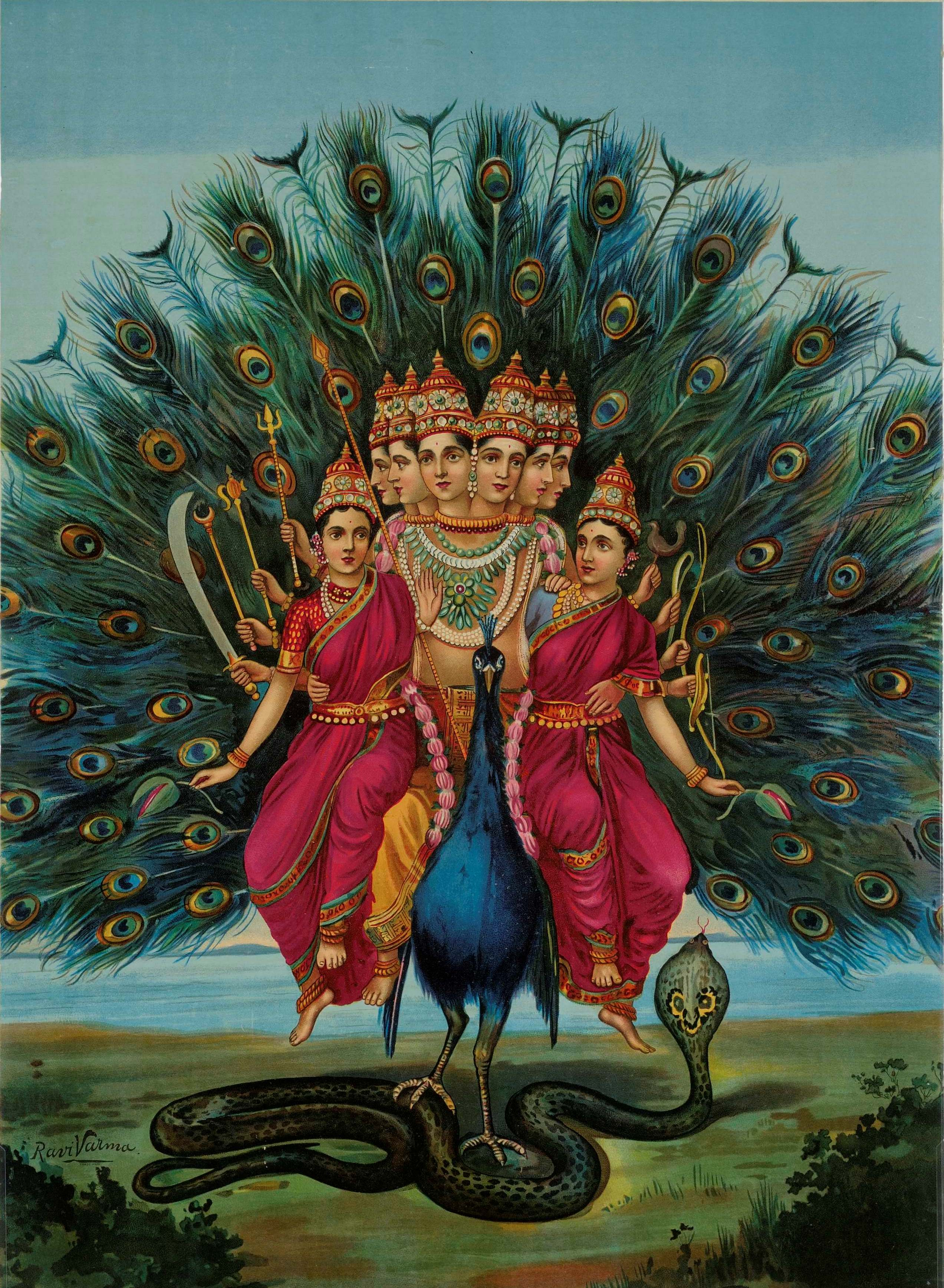
Sri Shanmukha Subramania Swami

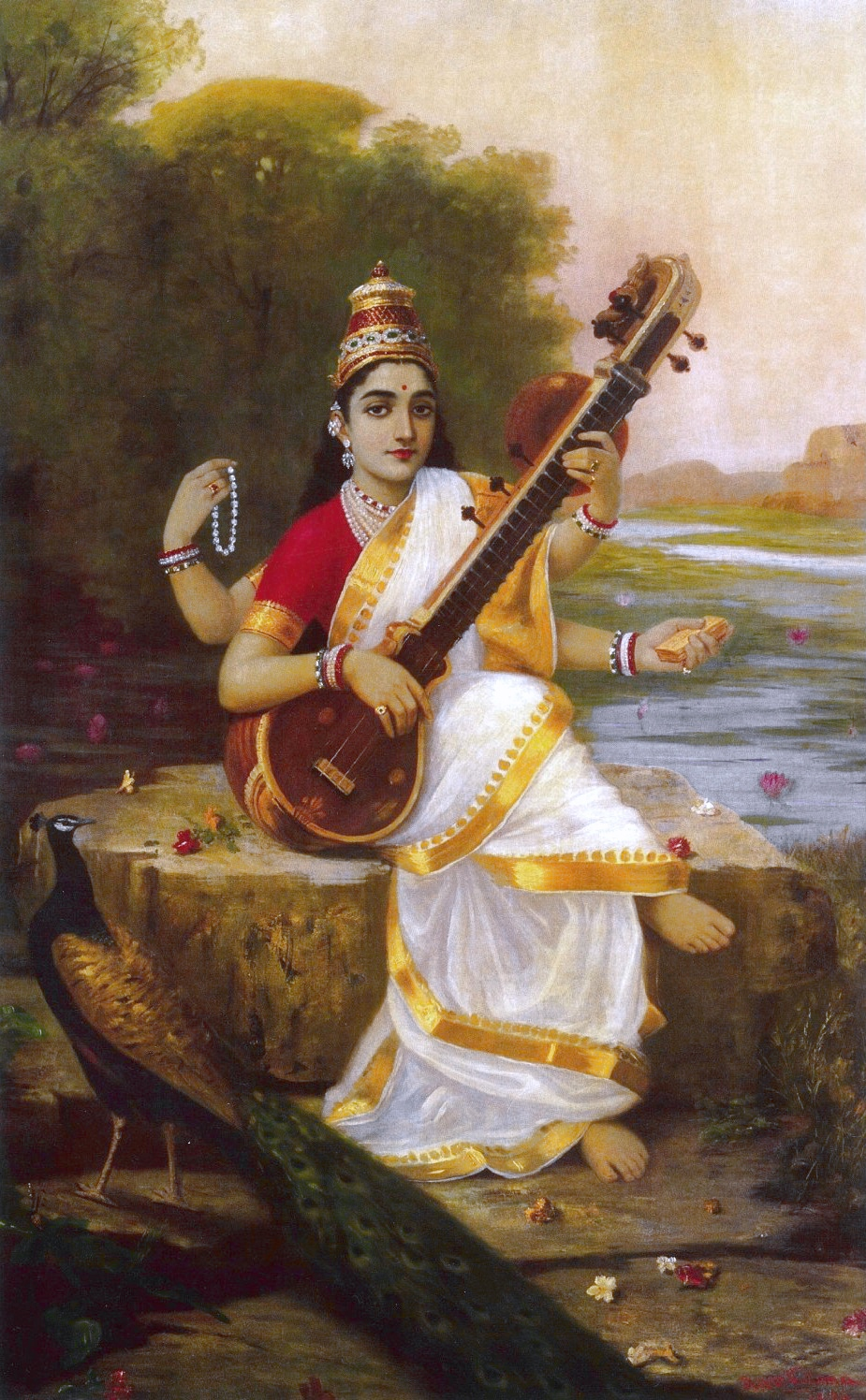
Saraswati

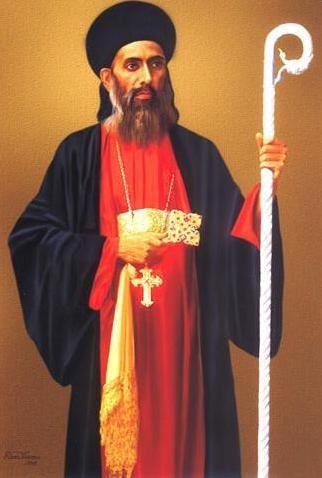
Geevarghese Mar Gregorios of Parumala

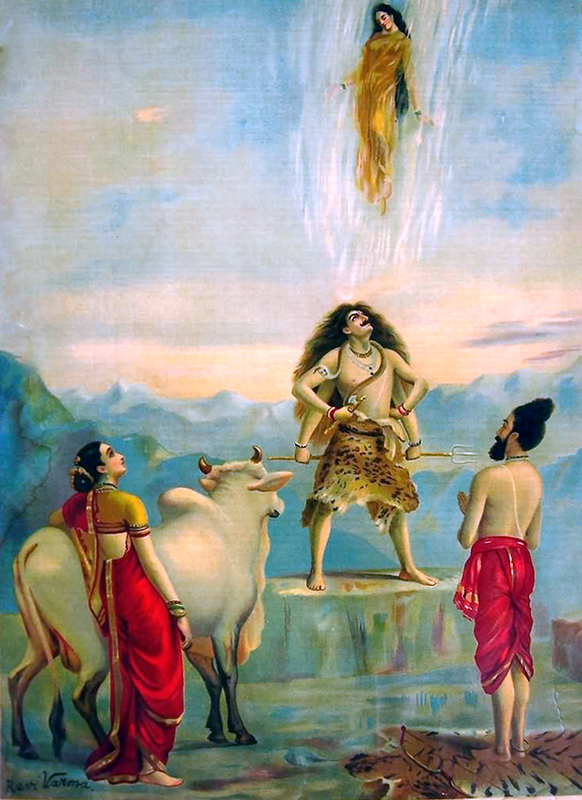
Descent of Ganga

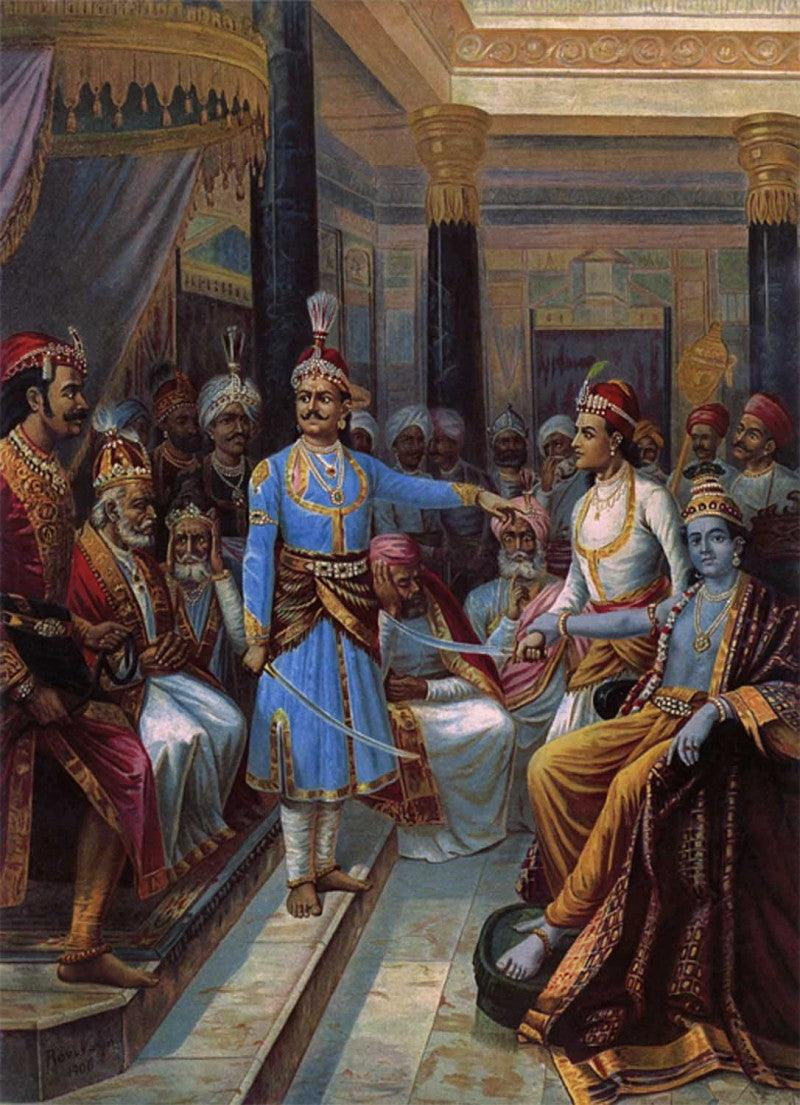
Sri Krishna as Envoy

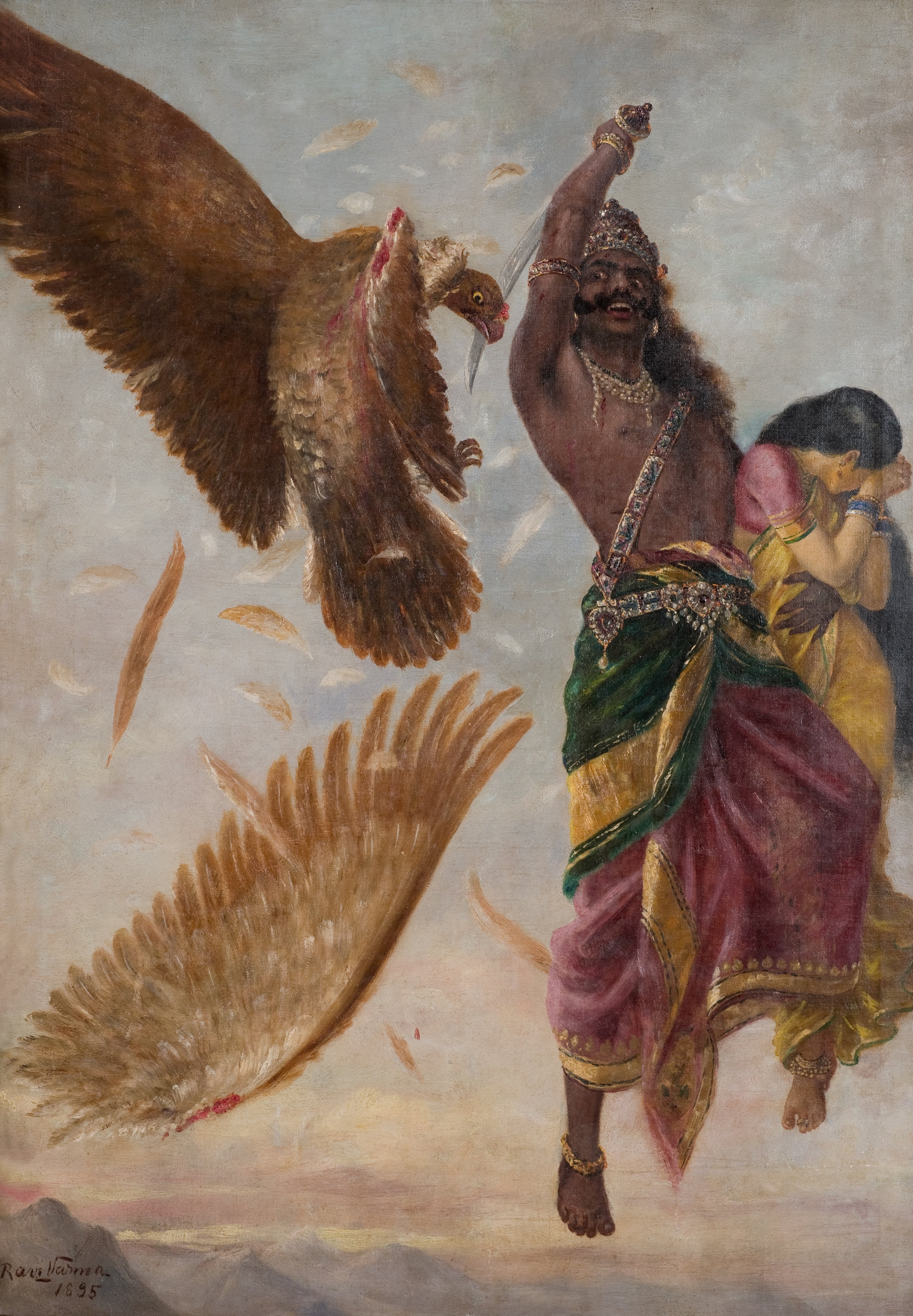
Jatayu fights Ravana

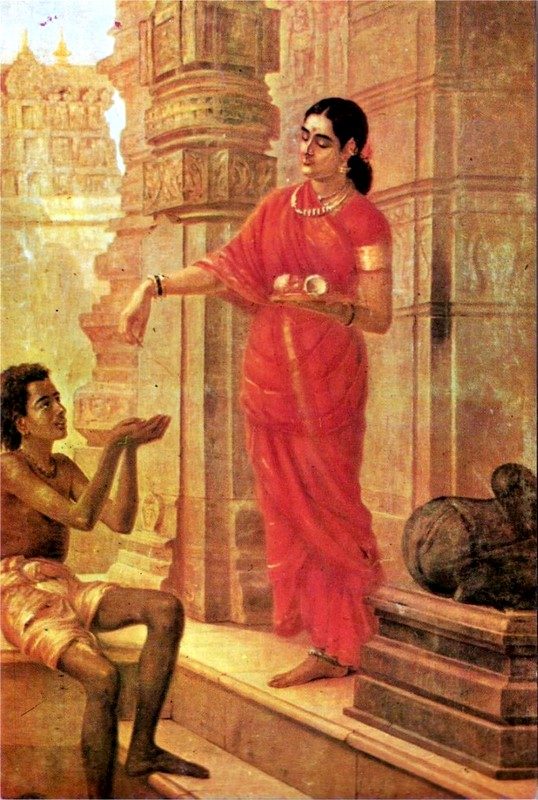
Lady giving alms in a temple

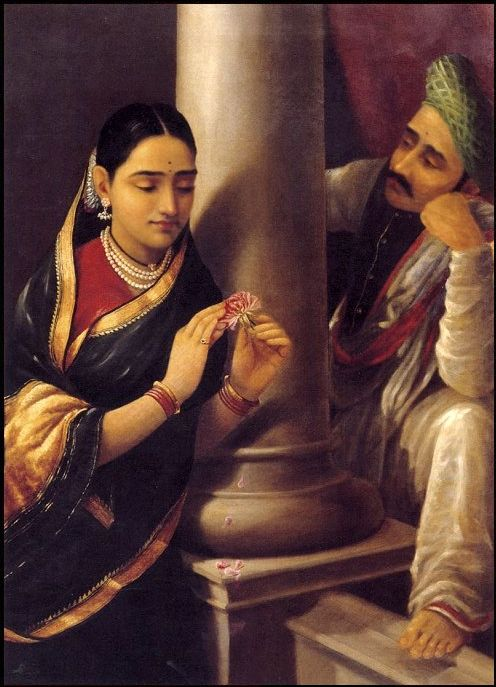
Stolen Interview

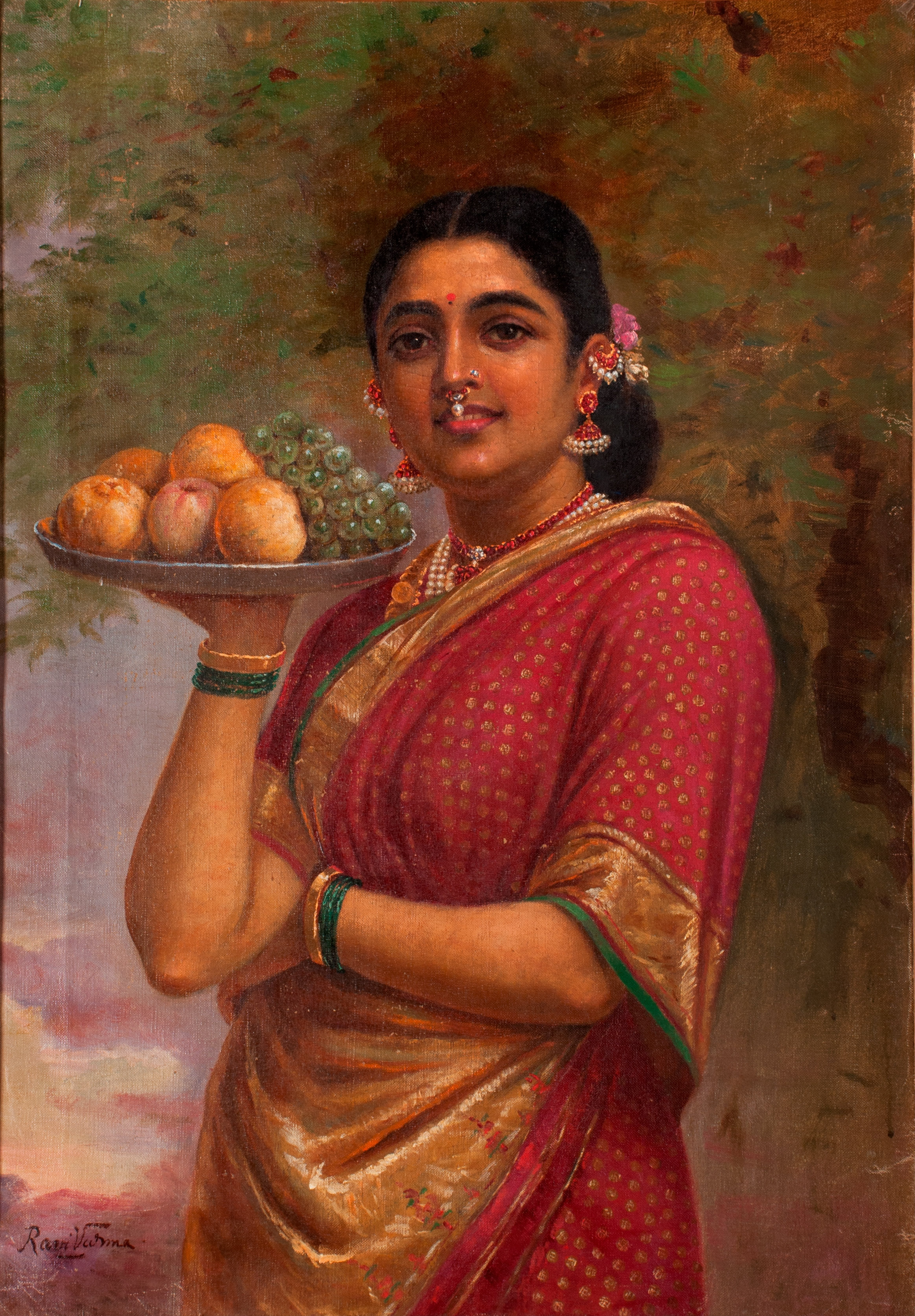
The Maharashtrian Lady

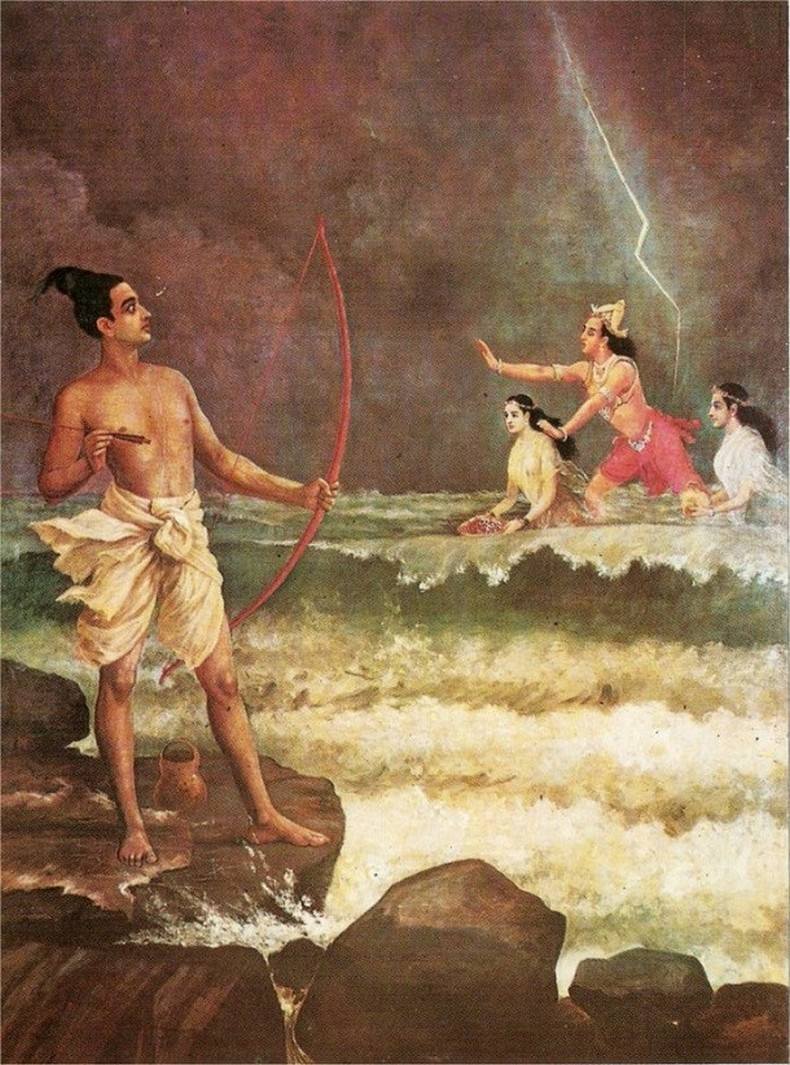
Rama vanquishing the ocean

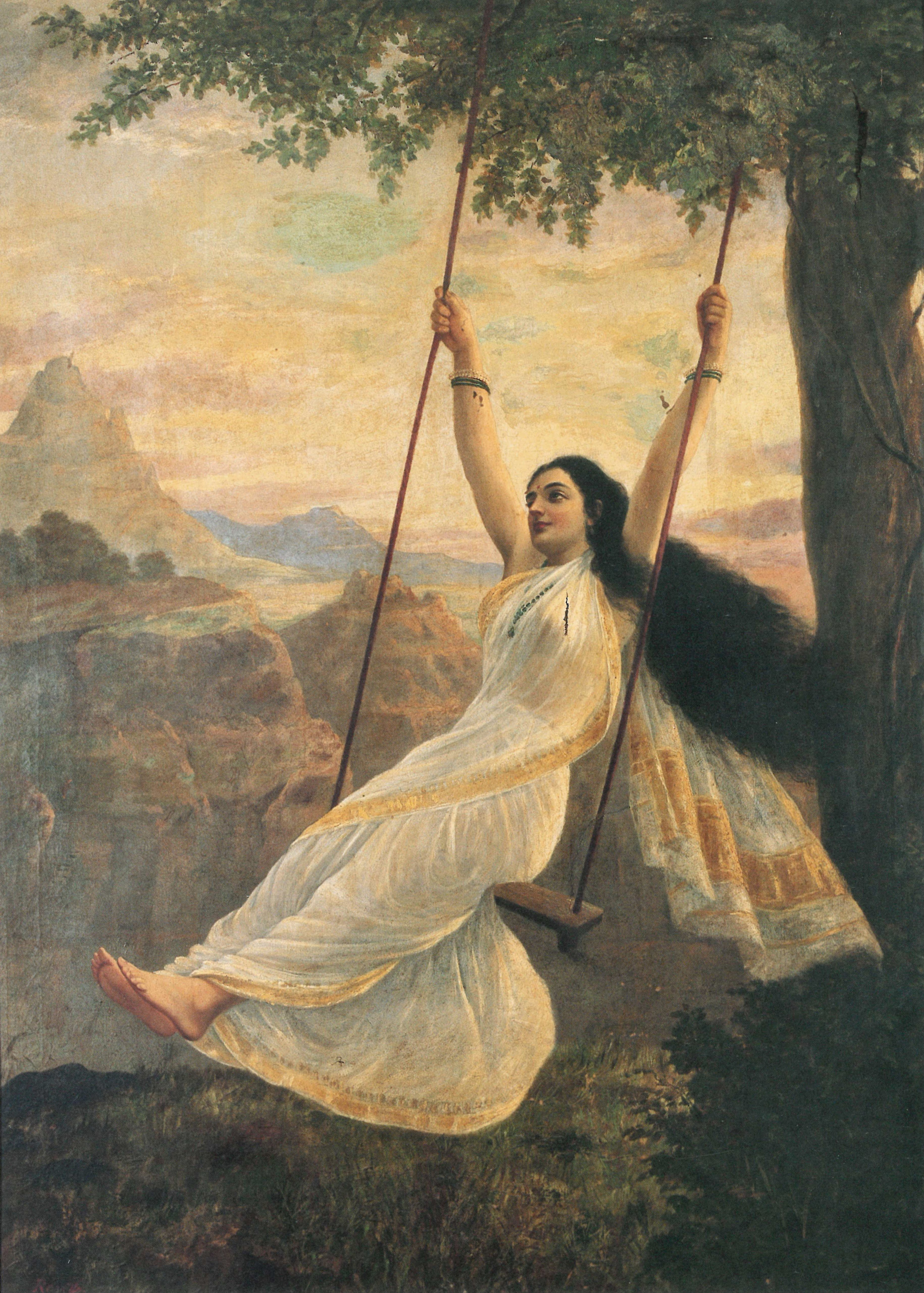
Mohini on a swing

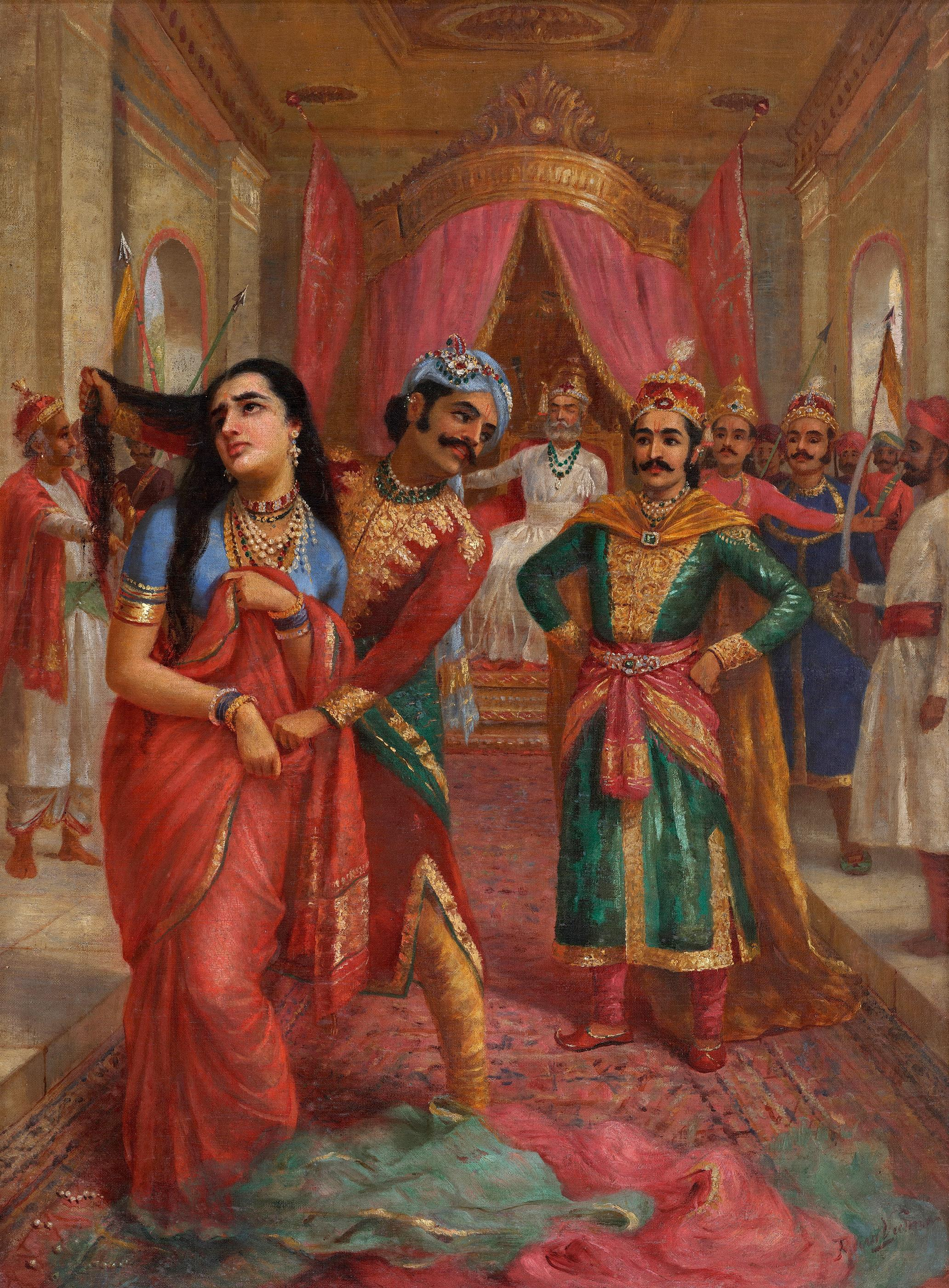
Disrobing of Draupadi

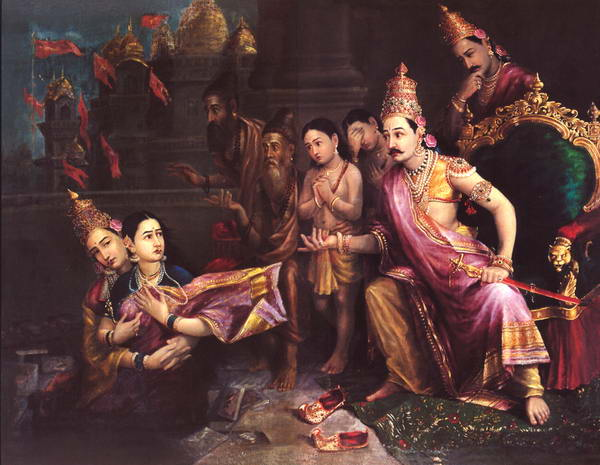
Sita Bhumi Pravesh

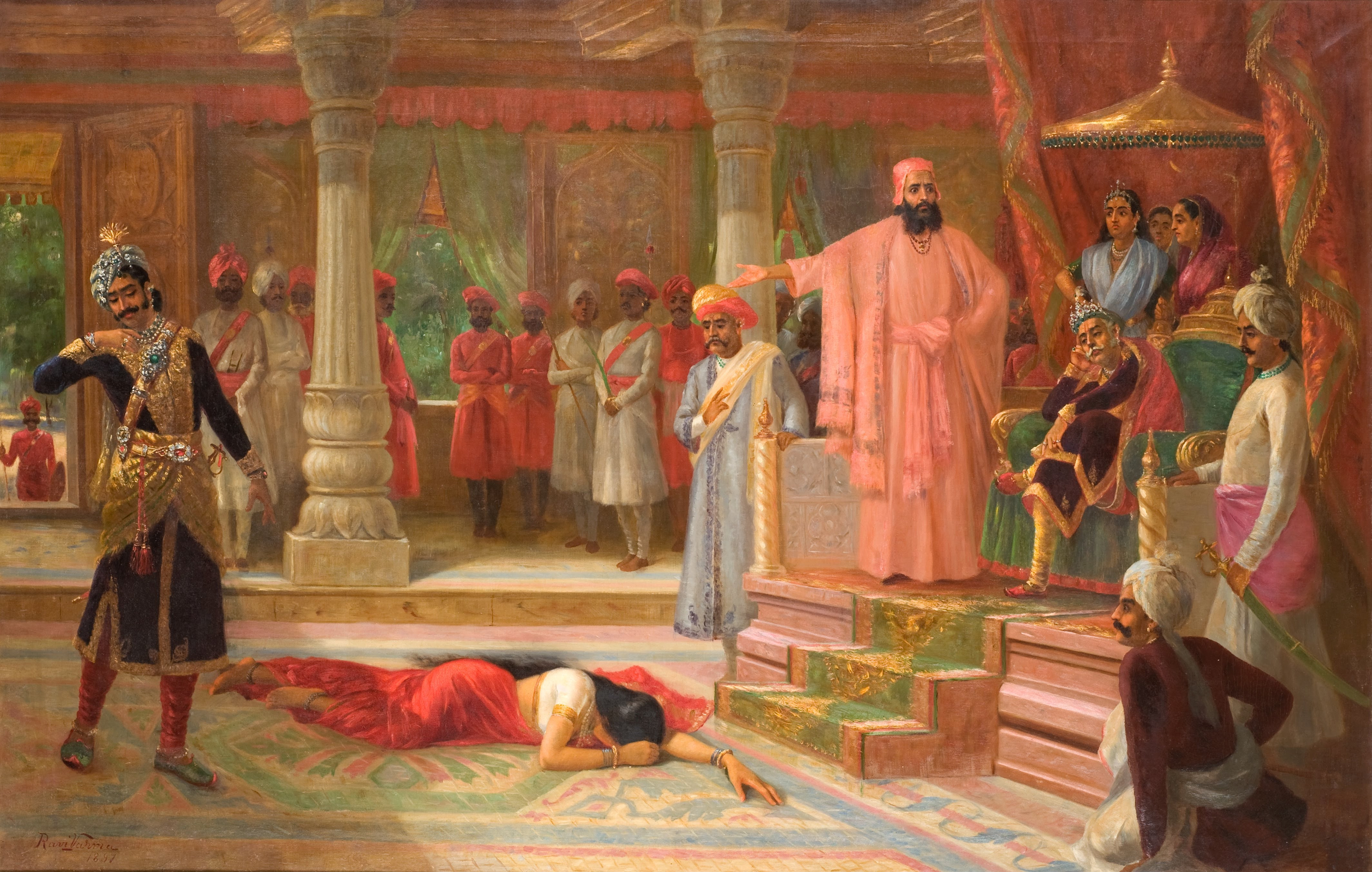
Draupadi being humiliated in the court of Virata

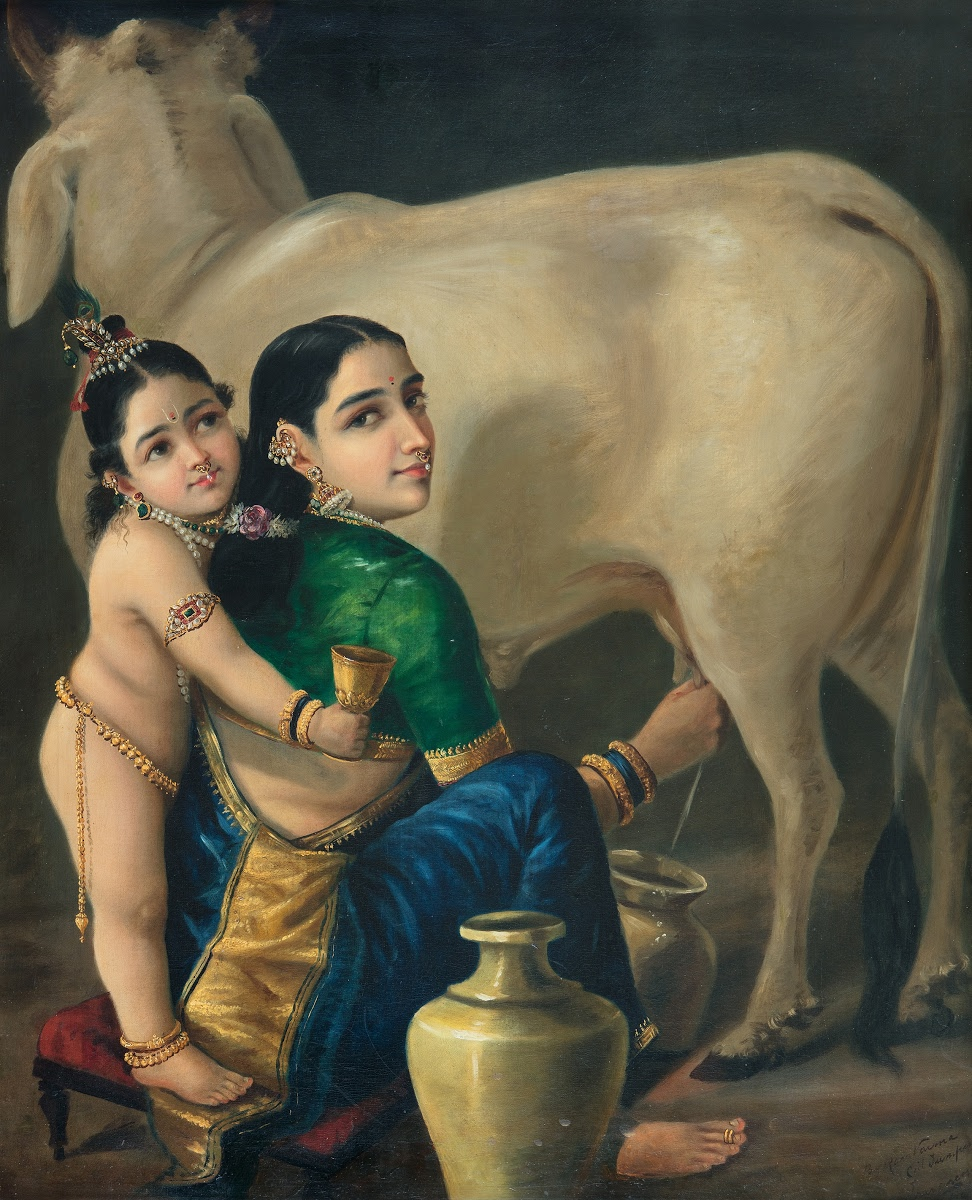
Krishna with Yashoda

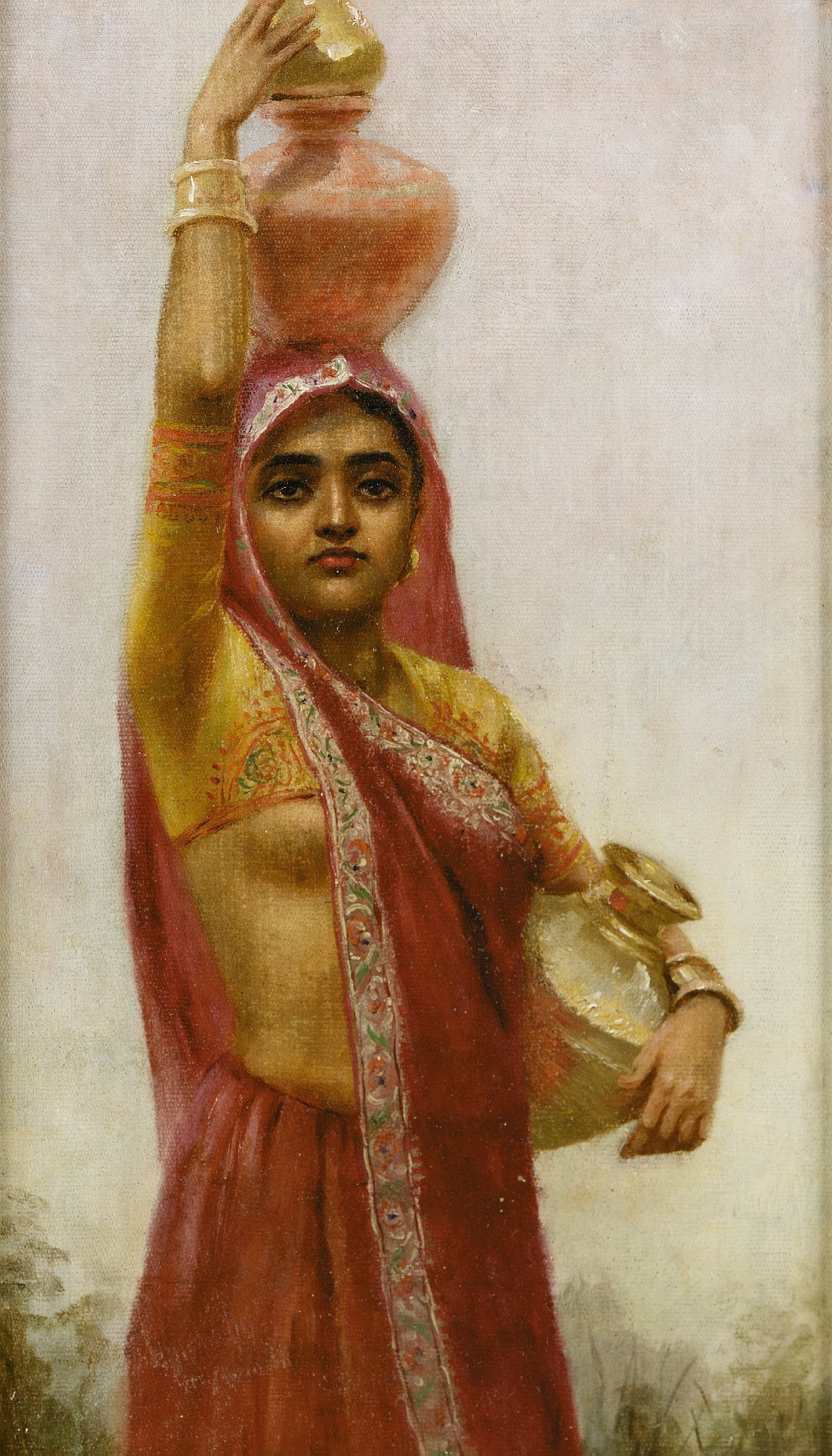
Village Belle

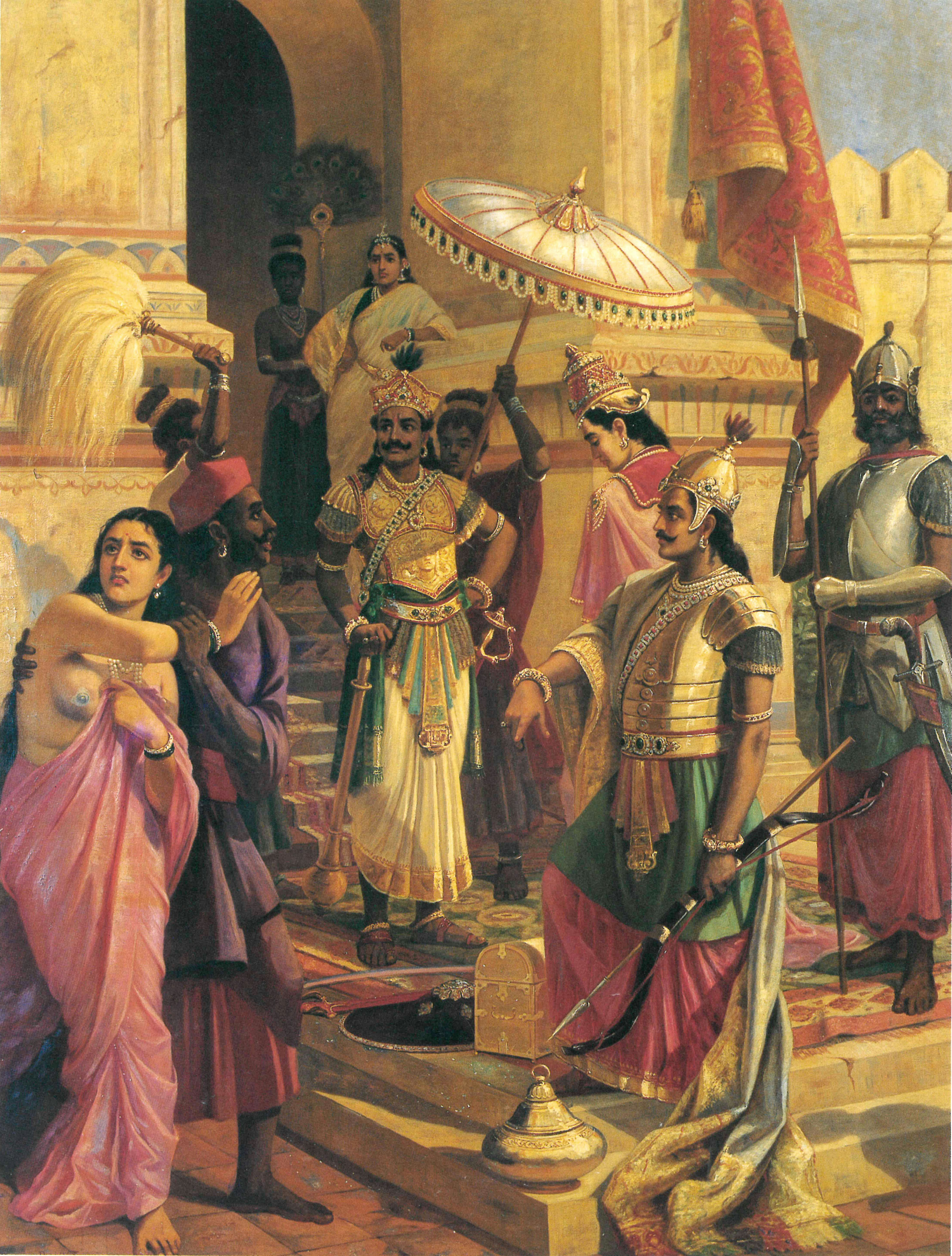
Victory of Meghanada

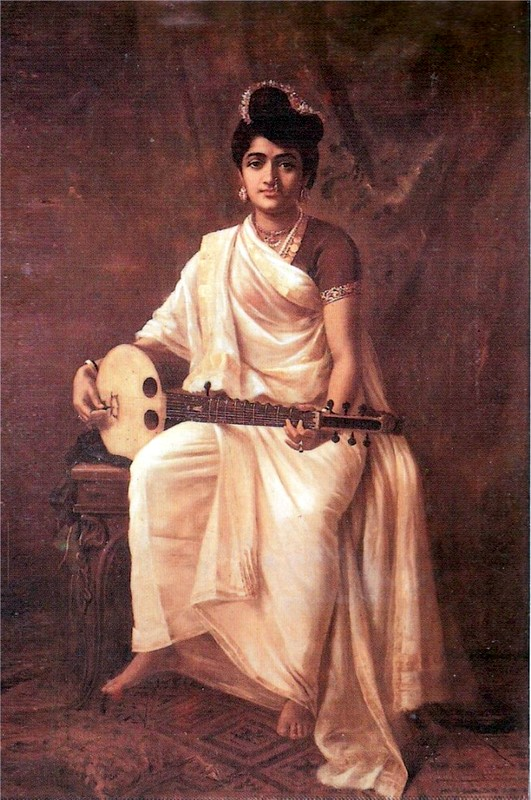
Malabar Lady or Swarbat Player

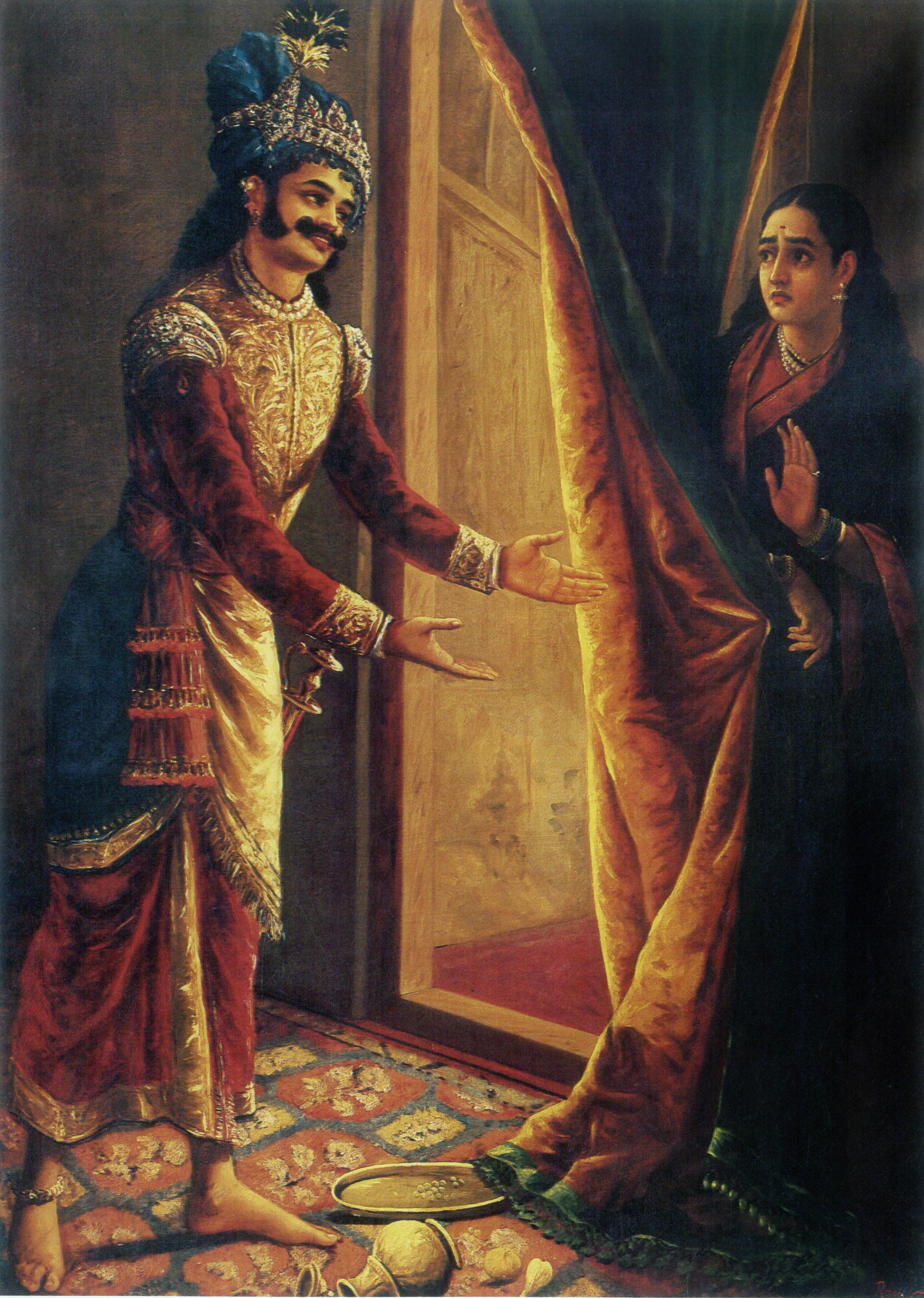
Keechaka and Sairandhri

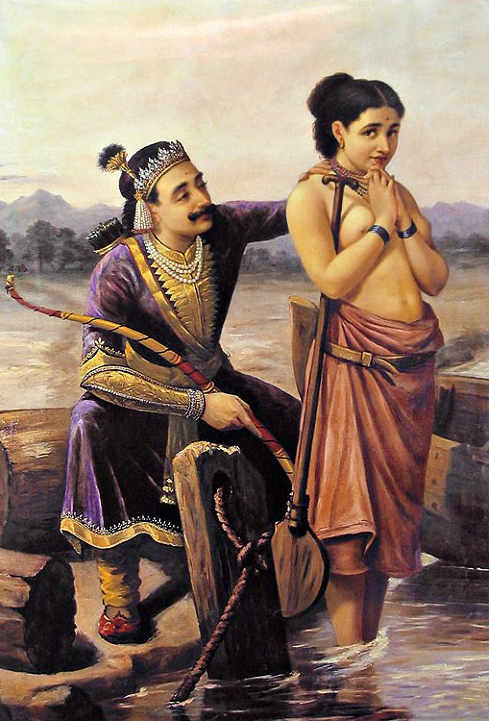
Shantanu and Matsyagandha

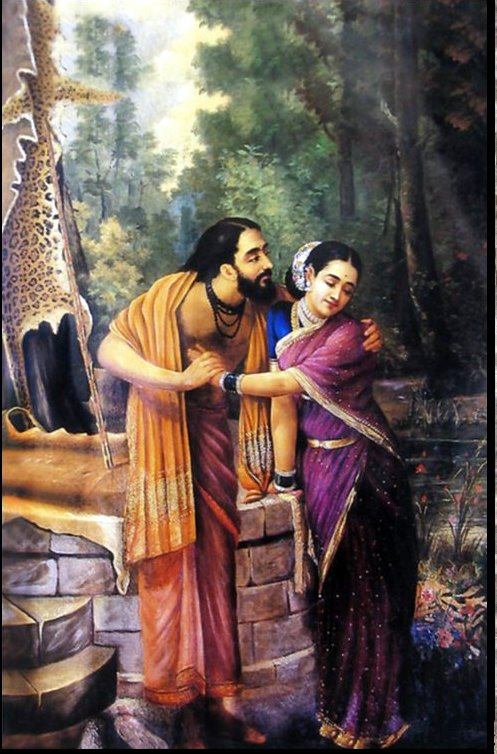
Arjuna and Subhadra

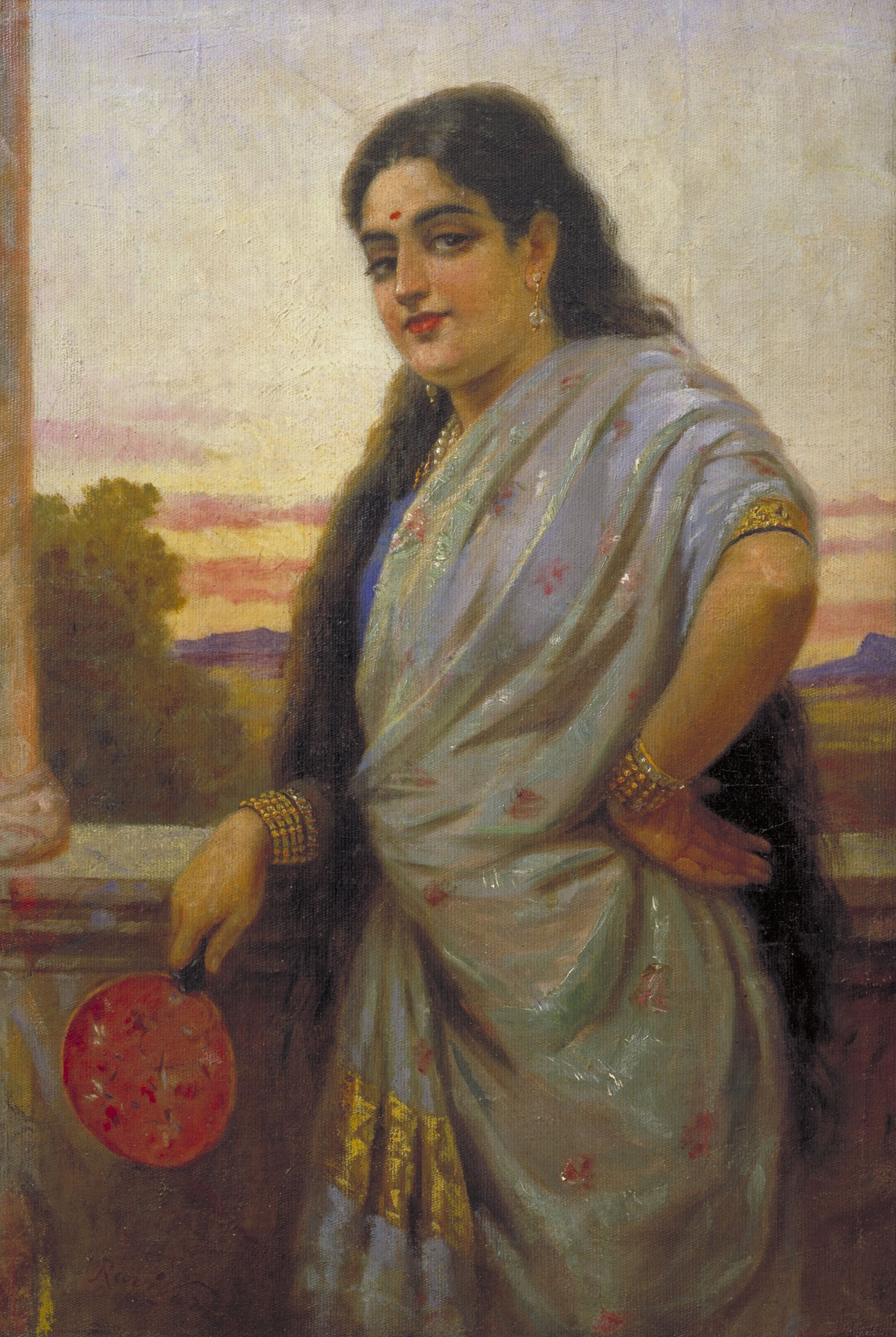
Woman holding a fan

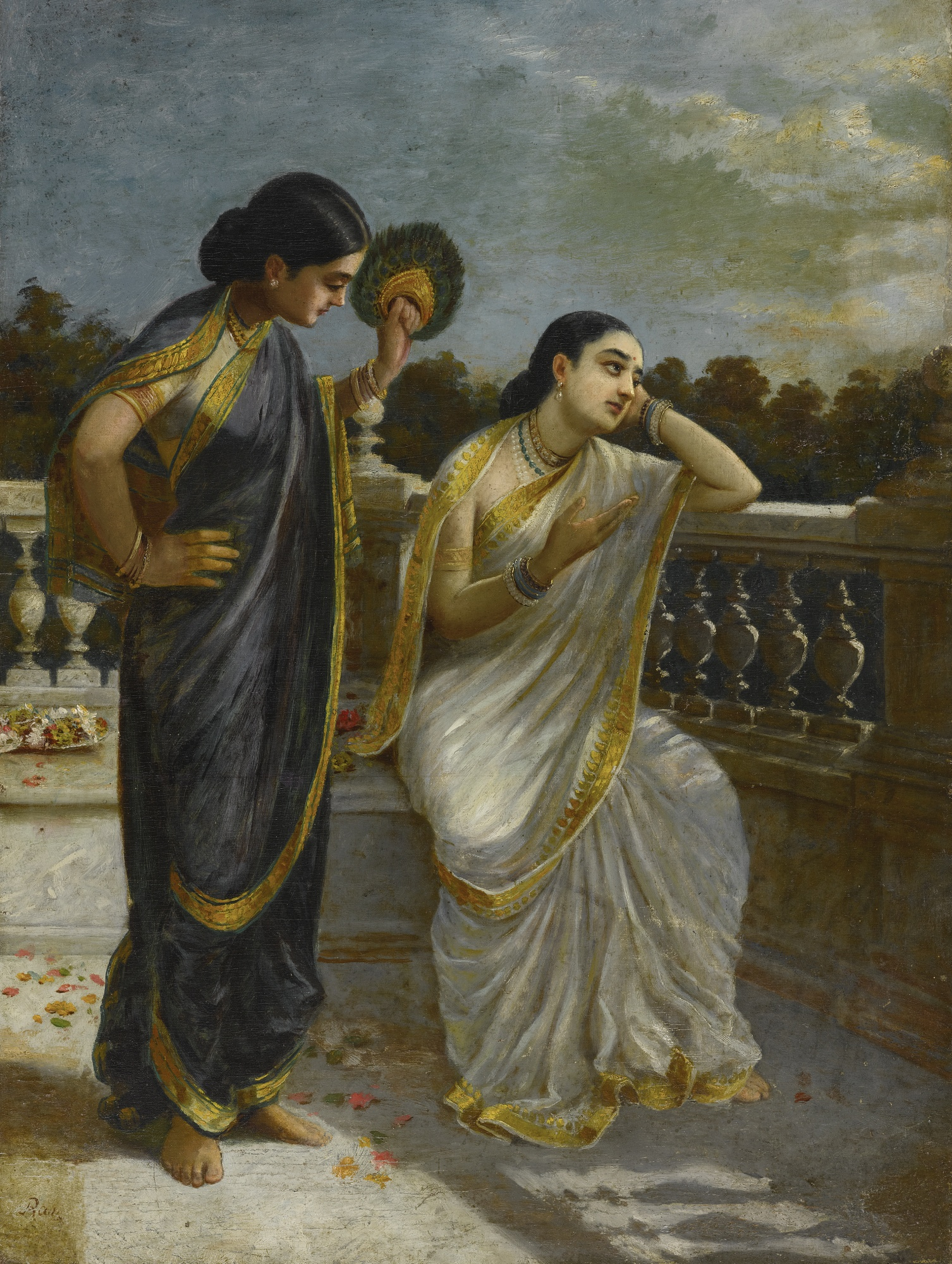
Damayanti and her maid in the moonlight

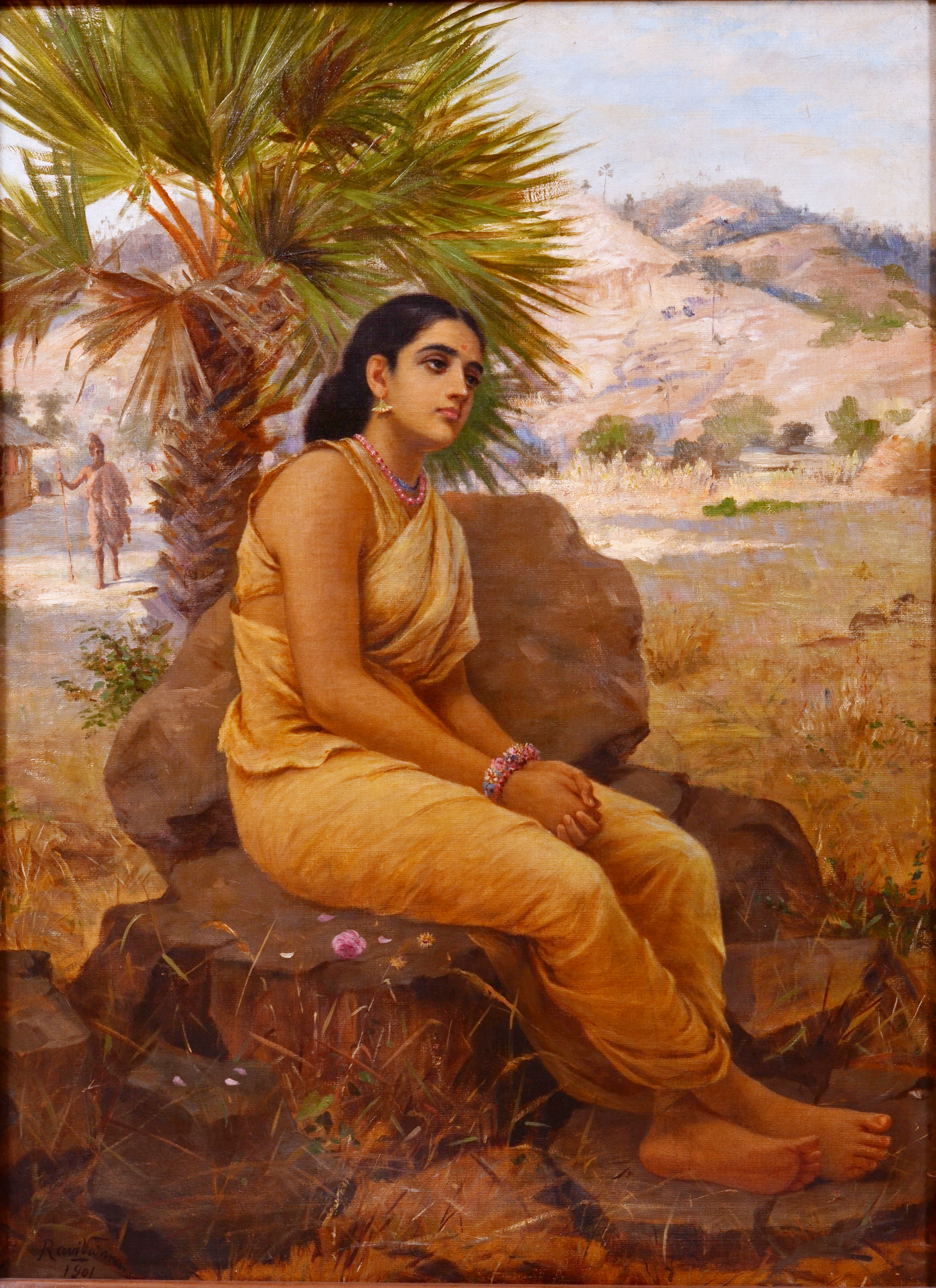
Shakuntala lost in thoughts

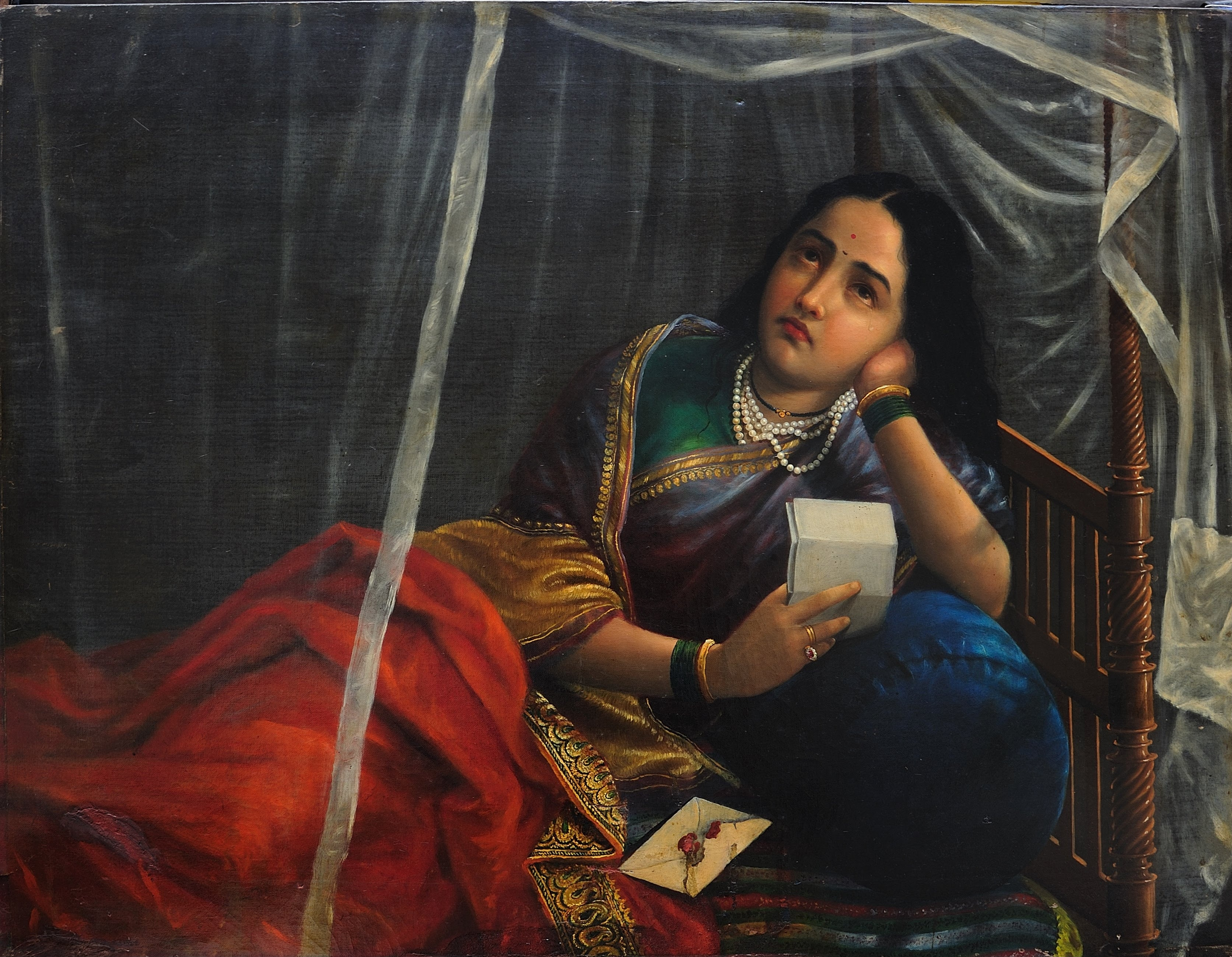
Disappointing News

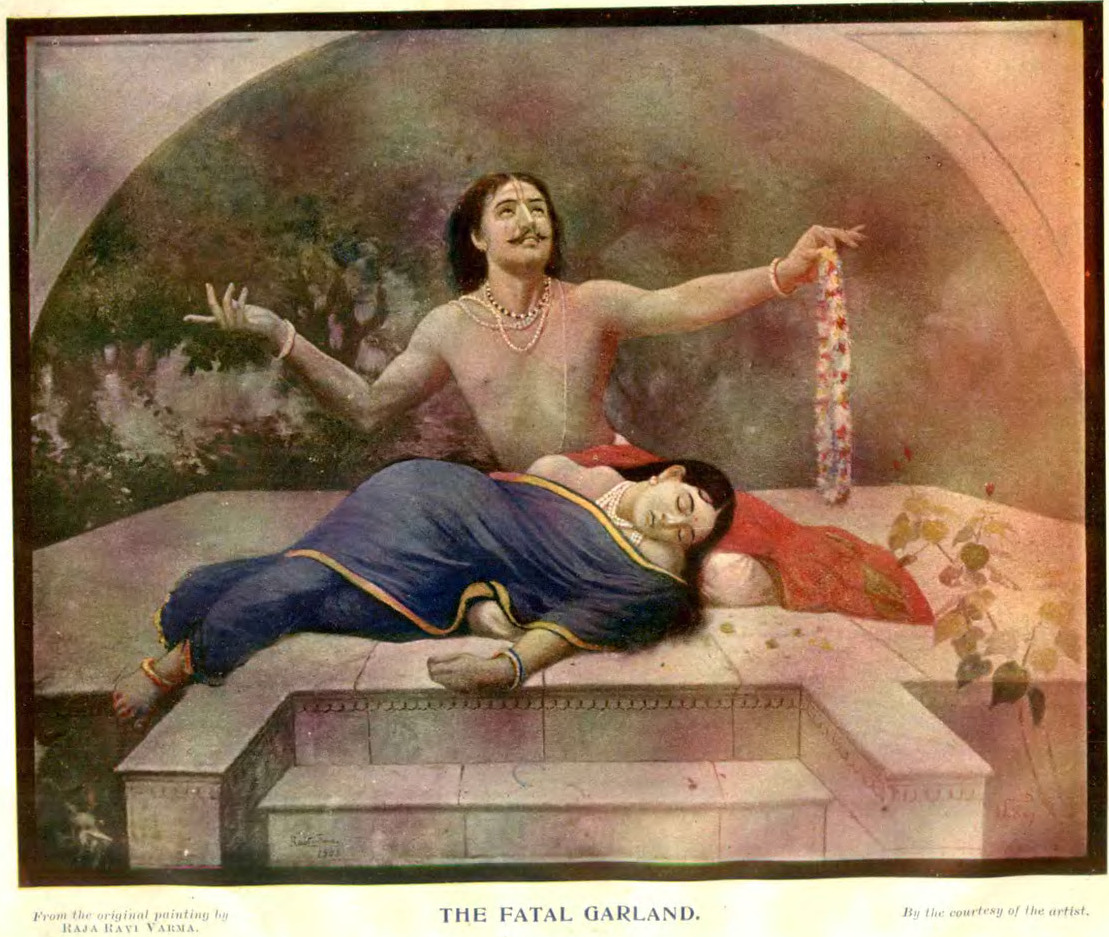
The Fatal Garland

== In popular culture ==
J. Sasikumar made Raja Ravi Varma, an Indian documentary television film on the artist in 1997. It was produced by the Government of India's Films Division.

Makaramanju (English: The Mist of Capricorn) is a 2011 Indian Malayalam-language romantic drama film by Lenin Rajendran starring Santosh Sivan as Varma, the film focuses on Varma's painting "Urvashi Pururavas". The 2014 Indian Hindi-language film, Rang Rasiya (English title: Colours of Passion) explores Varma's inspiration behind his paintings with Randeep Hooda in the role of the painter.

== Bibliography ==
=== English ===
- Raja Ravi Varma: An Everlasting Imprint; Volume 3- A Divine Omnipresence by Ganesh V. Shivaswamy, Pub: White Falcon, Chandigarh, March 2024 ISBN 9781636409344
- Raja Ravi Varma: An Everlasting Imprint; Volume 2- A Resonant Impression by Ganesh V. Shivaswamy, Pub: White Falcon, Chandigarh, Nov 2023 ISBN 9781636409085
- Raja Ravi Varma: An Everlasting Imprint; Volume 1- The Shaping of an Artist by Ganesh V. Shivaswamy, Pub: White Falcon, Chandigarh, March 2023 ISBN 9781636408460
- Raja Ravi Varma: Painter of Colonial Indian by Rupika Chawla, Pub: Mapin Publishing, Ahmedabad, March 2010.
- Raja Ravi Varma – Oleographs Catalogue by D.Jegat Ishwari, Pub: ShriParasuraman, Chennai, 2010, ISBN 9788191002614
- Ravi Varma Classic: 2008, Genesis Art Foundation, Cochin-18;45 colour plate with text by Vijayakumar Menon.
- The Painter: A life of Ravi Varma by Deepanjana Pal Random House India, 2011 ISBN 9788184002614
- Raja Ravi Varma – The Most Celebrated Painter of India: 1848–1906, Parsram Mangharam, Bangalore, 2007
- Raja Ravi Varma – The Painter Prince: 1848–1906, Parsram Mangharam, Bangalore, 2003
- Raja Ravi Varma and the Printed Gods of India, Erwin Neumayer & Christine Schelberger, New Delhi, Oxford University Press, 2003
- Raja Ravi Varma: The Most Celebrated Painter of India : 1848 – 1906, Classic Collection, Vol I & II. Bangalore, Parsram Mangharam, 2005
- Raja Ravi Varma: Portrait of an Artist, The Diary of C. Raja Raja Varma/edited by Erwin Neumayer and Christine Schelberger. New Delhi, Oxford University Press, 2005
- Divine Lithography, Enrico Castelli and Giovanni Aprile, New Delhi, Il Tamburo Parlante Documentation Centre and Ethnographic Museum, 2005
- Photos of the Gods: The Printed Image and Political Struggle in India by Christopher Pinney. London, Reaktion Book, 2004
- Raja Ravi Varma:Raja Ravi Varma:E.M Joseph Venniyur, former director of AIR
- Raja Ravi Varma: A Novel, Ranjit Desai -Translated by Vikrant Pande, Pub: Harper Perennial (2013), ISBN 9789350296615
- Pages of a Mind: Life and Expressions, Raja Ravi Varma, Pub: Piramal Art Foundation (2016), ISBN 9788193066805

=== Gujarati ===
- Raja Ravi Varma (રાજા રવિ વર્મા) by Dr. Bharat Kheni, won Sahitya Akademi Yuva Puraskar, 2022

=== Malayalam ===
- Ravi Varma – A critical study by Vijayakumar Menon, Pub: Kerala Lalitha Kala Akademy, Trissur, 2002
- Raja Ravi Varmayum chitrkalayum, Kilimanoor Chandran, Department of Cultural Publications, Kerala Government, 1999.
- Chithramezhuthu Koyithampuran, P. N. Narayana Pillai.
- Raja Ravi Varma, N. Balakrishnan Nair.

=== Marathi ===
- Raja Ravi Varma, a novel by Marathi language novelist Ranjit Desai translated into English by Vikrant Pande.
