= C. Raja Raja Varma =

Indian painter

C. Raja Raja Varma was an Indian painter and the youngest brother of the painter Raja Ravi Varma. He was known as a plein-air artist. He acted as assistant, secretary, and business manager to his brother.

== Life ==
Varma was also an English language scholar. His diary The Diary of C. Raja Raja Varma was published by Oxford University Press (edited by Erwin Neumayer and Christine Schelberger). It is considered one of the most important and authentic source materials on the last ten years of the life of Raja Ravi Varma.

On 4 January 1905 after an operation for inflammation of the intestines, Raja Varma died childless at Bangalore. His nephew said that Varma regretted not having provided well for his wife, Janaki, who outlived him.

The British administrator Edgar Thurston was significant in promoting the careers of both Varma brothers.
