= Galaxy of Musicians =

Painting by Raja Ravi Varma

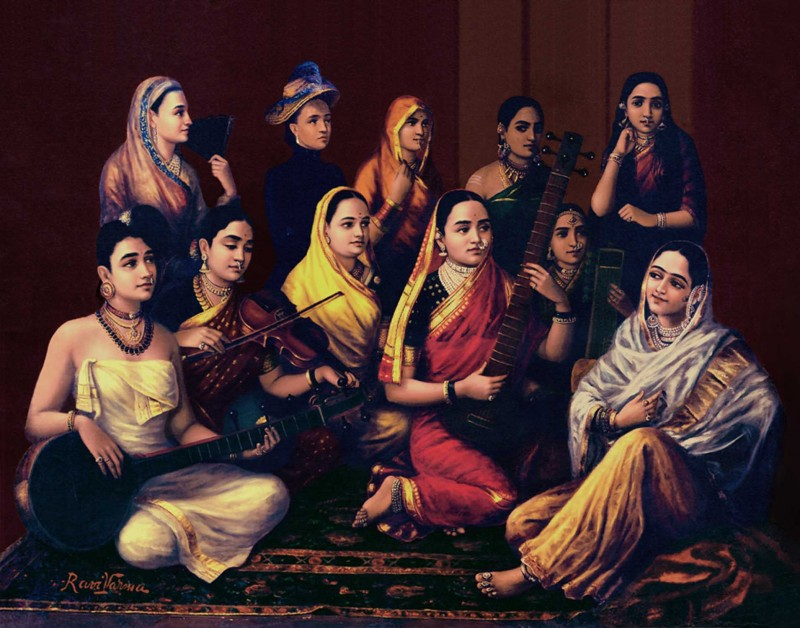
- Artist: Raja Ravi Varma
- Year: 1889
- Type: Oil on Canvas
- Location: Jaganmohan Palace

Galaxy of Musicians is an 1889 painting by the Indian artist Raja Ravi Varma.

== Description ==
The painting shows a group of Indian women from various backgrounds playing their traditional instruments; from the Muslim courtesan on the right to the Nair woman playing a veena on the left and Marathi woman at centre the painting emphasizes the dresses and adornments of women from all over India. Originally painted for the Maharaja of Mysore, Ravi Varma focused in one painting on each group's customs and how they all characterized music.

== See also ==
- There Comes Papa
- Nair Lady Adorning Her Hair
