= Nair Lady Adorning Her Hair (Varma) =

1873 painting by Raja Ravi Varma

Nair lady Adorning Her Hair
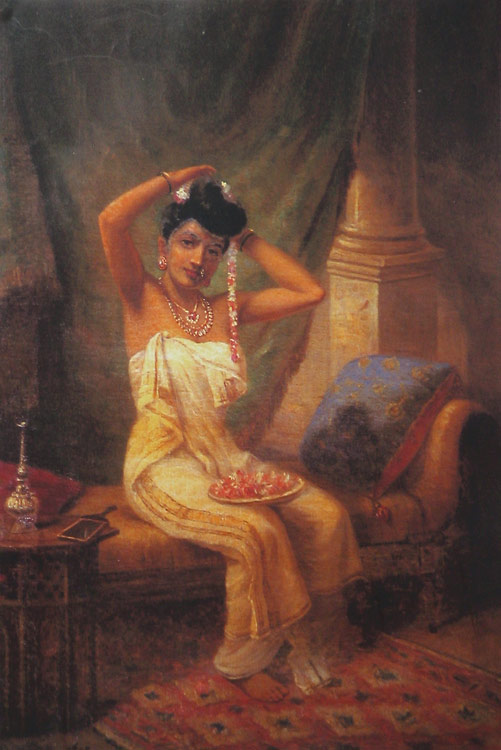
- Artist: Raja Ravi Varma
- Year: 1873
- Type: Oil on Canvas

Nair lady Adorning Her Hair is an 1873 painting by Raja Ravi Varma. The painting depicts a domestic scene in which a Nair woman adorning her hair with a garland of flowers in front of a mirror. The painting was notable for being the first major award-winning work that Ravi Varma had completed. Receiving praise at the international and national level, the painting had brought the young Ravi Varma into the attention of the global artistic community, as well as leading him on to later become one of the most well known modern Indian painters.

== Background ==
Raja Ravi Varma was born on 1848 in Kerala, India. Ravi Varma was primarily known for incorporating Hindu themes and ideals with European styles. Varma was one of the first Indian artists to make use of oil painting and lithographic methods. Ravi Varma was first exposed to European methods of painting when he watched a Dutch painter when he arrived to do some paintings for the palace.

Through trial and error, Ravi Varma had learned rudimentary techniques of oil painting. After deciding that painting would be a full-time profession, he had gone on to do some portraits and other small tasks for important local people. After returning to Trivandrum, Varma had been commissioned to do oil paintings for the Travancore Royal Court. After receiving an award for this task, he had gone on to paint The Nair Lady Adorning Her Hair, which was to be his first point of recognition in the national and international level.

== Subject and themes ==
Although Ravi Varma was trained in the European styles of painting——employing the techniques for illusionism and oil painting——Ravi Varma's style was primarily Malayali. The painting's subject includes a Nair lady adorning her hair in front of a mirror within a familiar household setting. Ravi Varma used techniques that used realism, but evoked styles from European artists such as Botticelli and Renoir. A common theme found in Ravi Varma's paintings are that of domesticity and female beauty, based on native values.

Ravi Varma's paintings of Nair women in general were seen as part of a turning point in the discourse on female sexuality within the matrilineal context. It has been described that a notable feature about Ravi Varma's paintings of such women were the passive beauty and unerotic sensuality. Of even greater significance was the image of domesticity that Ravi Varma had presented.

== Exhibition ==
The painting was awarded the first prize, the prestigious Governor's Gold Medal, when it was presented at the Madras Fine Arts Society Exhibition of 1873, bringing Raja Ravi Varma into the limelight. He also received a Certificate of Merit at the International Exhibition held in Vienna for the painting.
