= Shakuntala (disambiguation) =

Shakuntala is a character from the Hindu epic Mahabharata.

Shakuntala, or variant spellings such as Sacontala or Sakuntala, may refer to:

== Arts and entertainment ==
=== Films ===
- Shakuntala (1920 film), a 1920 Indian silent film by Suchet Singh
- Shakuntala (1932 film), a 1932 Indian Telugu-language film by Sarvottam Badami
- Sakuntalai, 1940 Indian Tamil-language film
- Shakuntala (1943 film), a 1943 Indian costume drama film
- Shakuntala (1965 film), a 1965 Indian Malayalam-language film
- Sakunthala (1966 film), a 1966 Indian Telugu-language mythological film
- Sakuntalam, 2021 Indian Sanskrit-language film
- Shaakuntalam, 2023 Indian film directed by Gunasekhar

=== Other media ===
- Shakuntala (play), by Kalidasa (Sanskrit, 5th century CE or earlier)
- Shakuntala (epic), a poem by Laxmi Prasad Devkota (Nepali, 20th century CE) based on the eponymous play by Kalidasa
- Sakuntala (opera), composed in 1820 by Franz Schubert
- Shakuntala (Raja Ravi Varma), an 1870 epic painting by Raja Ravi Varma
- [La leggenda di] Sakùntala, opera in two versions (1921, 1952) by Franco Alfano
- Shakuntala (TV series), an Indian television series
- Sakuntala (Claudel), a sculpture by Camille Claudel

== People ==
- Sacuntala de Miranda (1934-2008), Português historian and political activist
- Shakuntala Bhagat (1933–2012), civil engineer
- Shakuntala Banerjee (born 1973), Indian-German television journalist
- Shakuntala Barua (born 1947), Indian actress
- Shakuntala Devi (disambiguation)
  - Shakuntala Devi (1929–2013), Indian writer and mental calculator
  - Sakuntla Devi (born 1972), Indian politician
- Shakuntla Khatak (born 1968), Indian politician
- Sakuntala Laguri (born 1980), Indian politician
- Sakuntala Panda (1939–2017), Indian writer
- Shakuntala Paranjpye (1906–2000), Indian actress
- Sakuntala Narasimhan, Indian classical singer and writer
- Telangana Shakuntala (1951–2014), Indian actress

== Other ==
- Shakuntala Park, in Kolkata
- Shakuntala Railway, in central India
