= Shakuntala (play) =

Sanskrit play by Kālidāsa

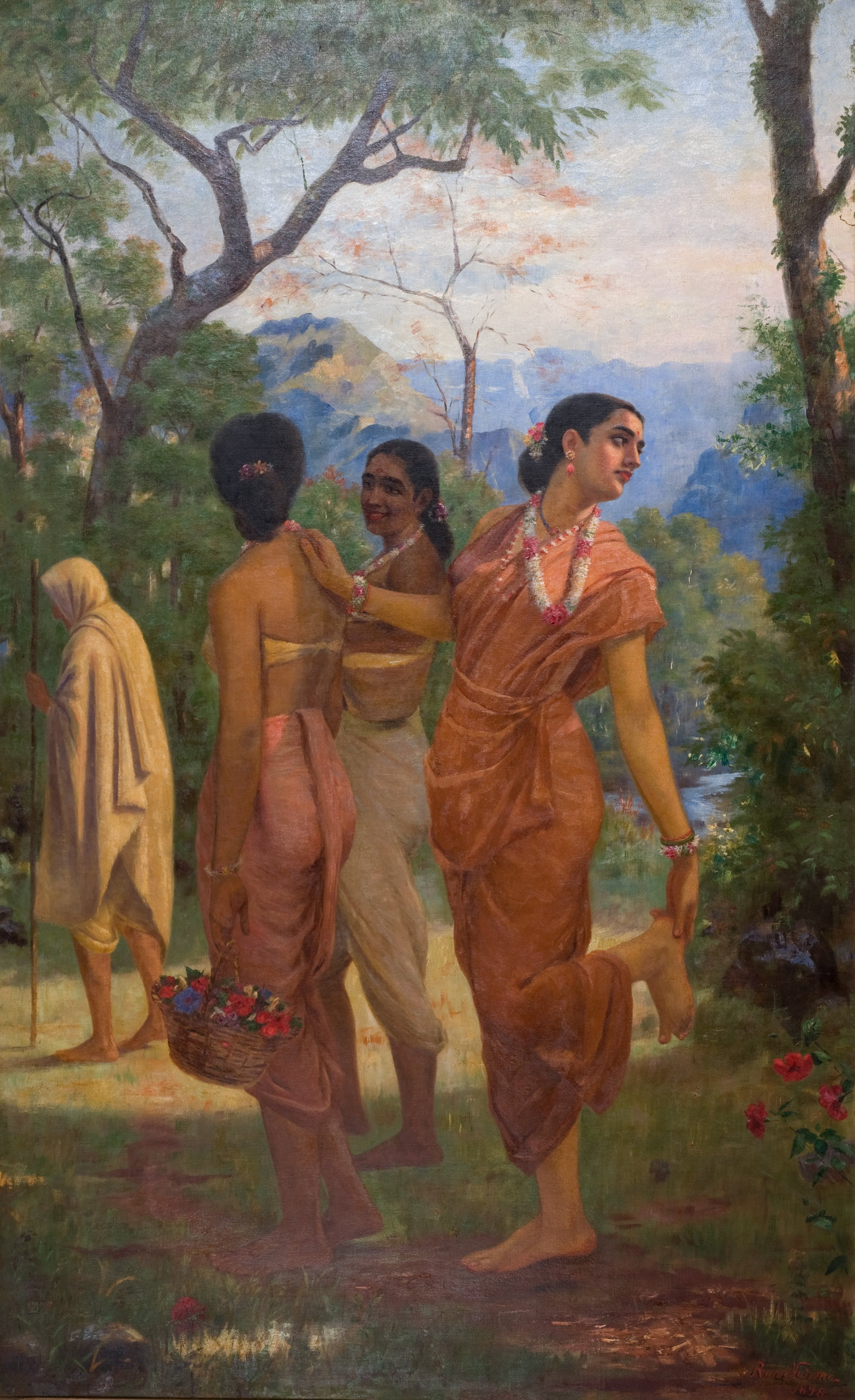
Shakuntala looking back to catch a glimpse of Dusyanta, scene from Shakuntala painted by Raja Ravi Varma

Abhijnanashakuntalam (Devanagari: अभिज्ञानशाकुन्तलम्, IAST: Abhijñānaśākuntalam), also known as Shakuntala, The Recognition of Shakuntala, The Sign of Shakuntala, is a Sanskrit play by the ancient Indian poet Kalidasa, dramatising the story of Shakuntala told in the epic Mahabharata and regarded as the best of Kalidasa's works. Its exact date is uncertain, but Kalidasa is often placed in the 4th century CE.

== Origin of Kālidāsa's play ==
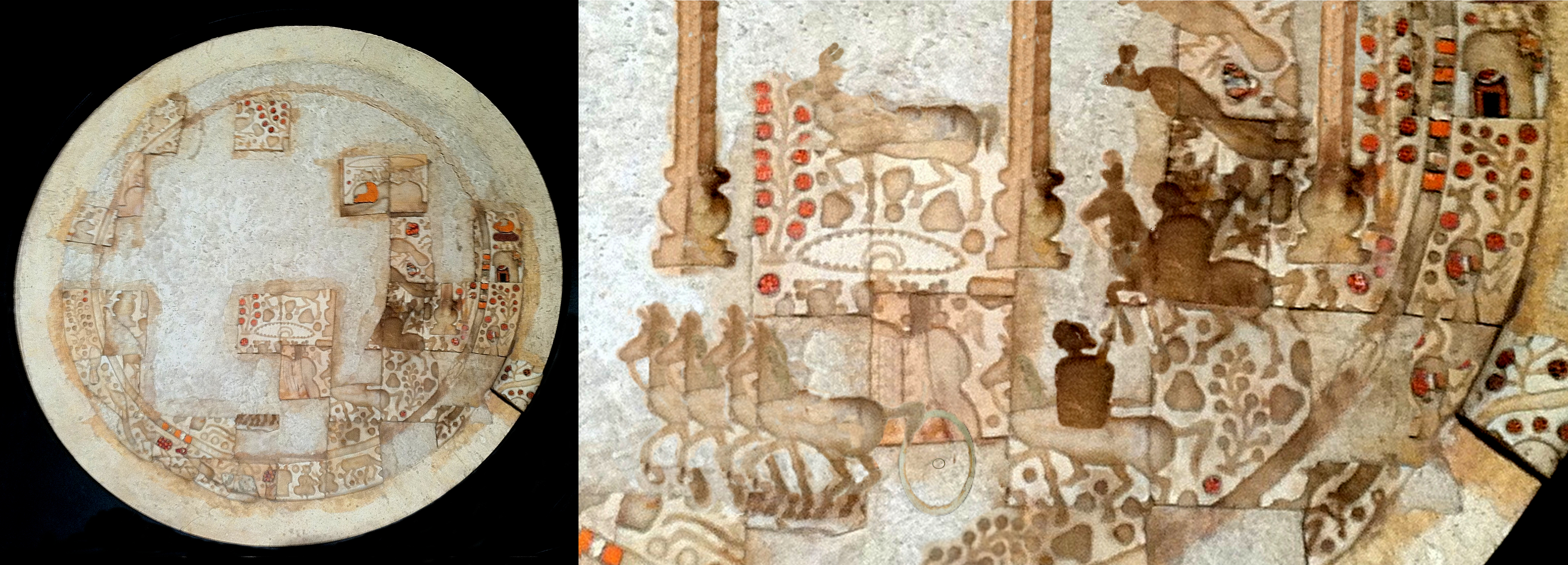
Indian plaque depicting the story of Shakuntala, found in the treasury of Ai-Khanoum, Bactria, 2nd century BCE

Plots similar to the play appear in earlier texts. There is a story mentioned in the Mahābhārata. A story of a similar plot appears in the Buddhist Jātaka tales as well. In the Mahābhārata, the story appears as a precursor to the Pāṇḍava and Kaūrava lineages. In the story, King Duṣyanta and Śakuntalā meet in the forest, become estranged and ultimately reunited. Their son Bharata is said to have laid the foundation of the dynasty that ultimately led to Kauravas and Pāṇḍavas.

=== Title ===
Manuscripts differ on what its exact title is. Usual variants are Abhijñānaśakuntalā, Abhijñānaśākuntala, Abhijñānaśakuntalam and Abhijñānaśākuntalam. The Sanskrit title means pertaining to the recognition of Śakuntalā, so a literal translation could be Of Śakuntalā who is recognised. The title is sometimes translated as The token-for-recognition of Śakuntalā or The Sign of Śakuntalā. Titles of the play in published translations include Sacontalá or The Fatal Ring and Śakoontalá or The Lost Ring.

== Characters ==
=== Prologue ===
Characters reciting the benediction are:

- Sūtradhāra ('Actor-manager') — Director/producer and over-all manager of the theatre, who also plays the hero of the play
- Naṭī ('Actress') — Sutradhara's wife who plays the heroine in the play

=== Play ===
Characters of the play listed in order of their appearance:

Character	Description
Sūta (Charioteer)	The royal charioteer, who also serves as a close companion to the king.
King Duṣyanta	Hero (Nayaka); ruler from the Puru branch of the Lunar dynasty.
Vaikhānasa	A reclusive forest hermit belonging to the spiritual lineage of sage Kanva.
Two Ascetics	Disciples receiving spiritual guidance from sage Kanva.
Śakuntalā	Heroine (Nayika); child of the sage Viśvāmitra and the celestial nymph Menakā, raised under the guardianship of sage Kanva.
Anasūyā	Young woman devoted to an ascetic life; companion of Śakuntalā, her name signifying “free from envy.”
Priyamvadā	Young female ascetic and friend of Śakuntalā, her name meaning “pleasant speaker.”
Ascetic (off-stage)	A practitioner of ascetic discipline in the service of sage Kanva.
Vidūṣaka (Mādhavya)	A corpulent Brahmin who serves as the king’s intimate companion and trusted adviser.
Attendants	Female members of the royal guard who also serve as the king’s bow-bearers.
Doorkeeper (Raivataka)	Gate attendant in the royal court.
General	The chief military commander serving under the king.
Two Seers	Young hermits residing in Kanva’s forest retreat.
Karabhaka	A royal envoy entrusted with delivering messages.
Assistant Sacrificer	A member of Kanva’s ascetic circle who aids in ritual duties.
Gautamī	An elder woman devoted to ascetic life in Kanva’s hermitage.
Voice in the Air (Act 3)	A disembodied voice delivering divine or unseen guidance.
Durvāsas (off-stage)	A formidable and quick-tempered ascetic sage.
Pupil (Viṣkambhaka)	A student under Kanva’s spiritual tutelage.
Ascetic (off-stage)	An unseen follower of Kanva’s ascetic order.
Three Hermit Women	Female recluses living in Kanva’s forest hermitage.
First Young Ascetic (Nārada)	A youthful ascetic disciple of Kanva.
Second Young Ascetic	Another youthful ascetic disciple of Kanva.
Kanva	A venerable Brahmin sage, head of the hermitage, and foster-father of Śakuntalā; also identified with the sage Kāśyapa.
Śārṅgarava	An ascetic belonging to Kanva’s order.
Voice in the Air (Act 4)	A supernatural voice heard without a visible speaker.
Voice (Haṃsapadikā)	A disembodied female voice, meaning “one with the gait of a swan.”
Chamberlain (Vātāyana)	Principal officer overseeing the administration of the royal household.
Doorkeeper (Vetravatī)	A female gate attendant in the royal residence.
One of Duṣyanta’s Consorts	A royal wife of King Duṣyanta.
Chief Officer of the Royal Household	Oversees domestic and ceremonial affairs within the palace.
Female Attendant	A woman serving in a supporting role within the royal quarters.
Two Bards (off-stage)	Court poets or singers whose voices are heard but who remain unseen.
Ārāḍvata	An ascetic associated with Kanva’s community.
Court Priest (Preceptor Somarāta)	The king’s chief religious adviser and officiant in rituals.
Two Policemen	Enforcers of law and order in the royal domain.
Chief of Police (Mitrāvasu)	Senior law officer of the realm; the king’s brother-in-law.
Man	A fisherman encountered in the course of events.
Sānumati	A celestial nymph and confidante of Menakā, mother of Śakuntalā.
First Gardener (Parabhṛtikā, “Little Cuckoo”)	A female gardener serving the palace grounds.
Second Gardener (Madhukarikā, “Little Bee”)	Another female gardener is attending the royal gardens.
Caturikā	A female domestic servant.
Bowbearer	A woman tasked with carrying and maintaining the king’s bow.
Mātali	The divine charioteer of Indra, sovereign of the gods.
Sarvadamana	The young son of Duṣyanta and Śakuntalā, later famed as Bharata.
Two Female Ascetics	Women dedicated to ascetic practice.
Mārīca (Kāśyapa)	A celestial sage, lord of the divine hermitage, and father of the god Indra.
Aditi	Wife of Mārīca.
Pupil (Galava)	A student under the instruction of Mārīca.

== Synopsis ==
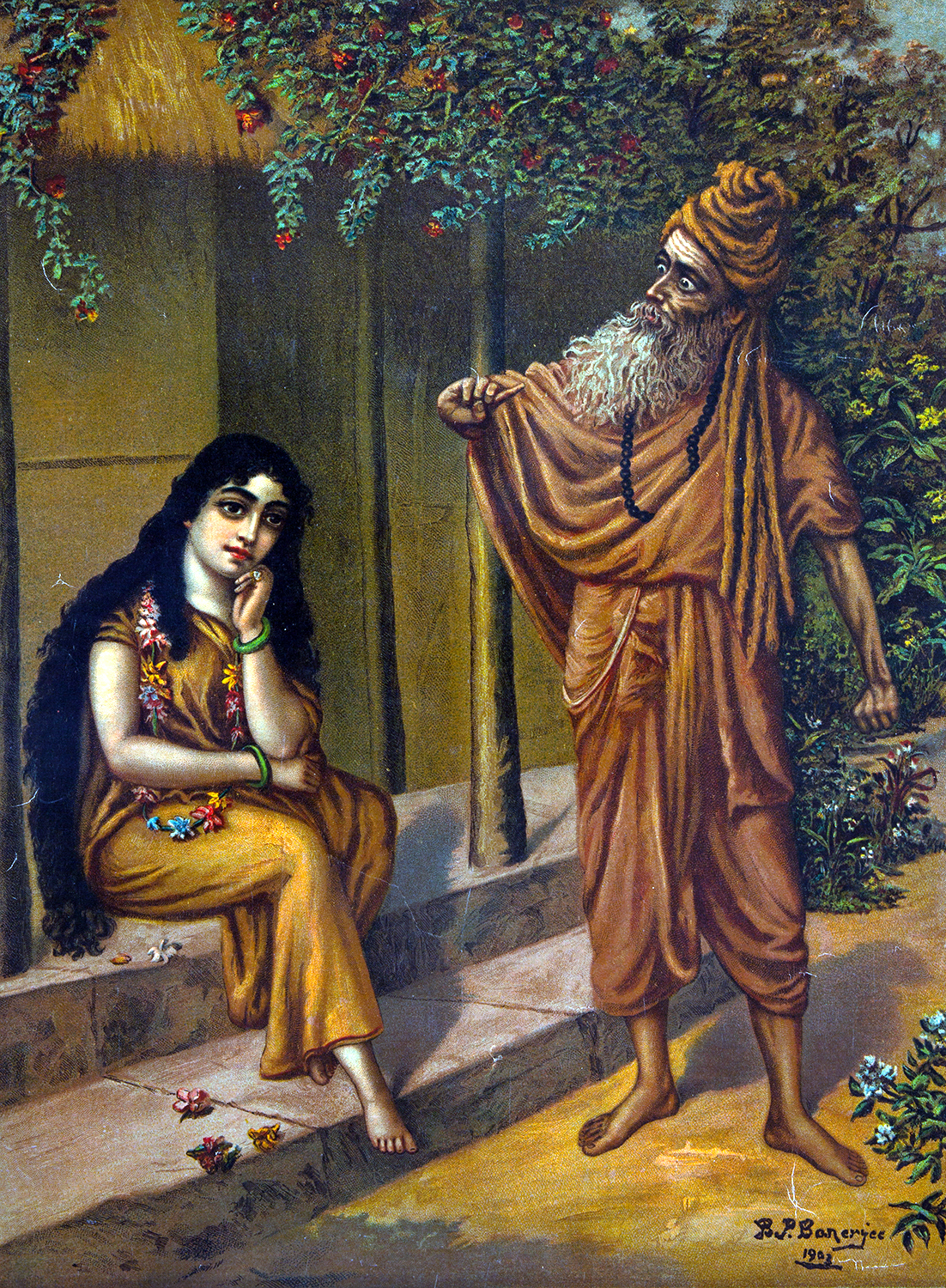
Kalidasa's version features much dramatised variant of the tale. One of Kalidasa's additions includes the sage Durvasa cursing Shakuntala (pictured; print by BP Banerjee).

The protagonist is Śakuntalā, daughter of the sage Viśvāmitra and the apsara Menakā. Abandoned at birth by her parents, Śakuntalā is reared in the secluded hermitage of the sage Kaṇva, and grows up a comely but naīve maiden.

While Kaṇva and the other elders of the hermitage are away on a pilgrimage, Duṣyanta, king of Hastināpura, comes hunting in the forest. Just as he was about to slay a deer, Vaikhānasa, a sage, obstructs him, saying that the deer was from the hermitage and must not be slain. He politely requests the king to take his arrow back, to which the king complies. The sage then informs him that they are going to collect firewood for the sacrificial fire and asks him to join them. They then spot the hermitage of Sage Kaṇva and decide to visit the hermits. However, the king decides to go to this penance grove dressed up as a commoner. He also stops the chariot farther away so as not to disturb the hermits. The moment he enters the hermitage and spots Śakuntalā, he is captivated by her, courts her in royal style, and marries her. Soon, he has to leave to take care of affairs in the capital. The king gives her a ring, which, as it turns out, will eventually have to be presented to him when she appears in his court to claim her place as queen.

One day, the short-tempered sage Durvāsa arrives when Śakuntala is lost in her thoughts. When she fails to attend to him, he curses her by bewitching Duṣyanta into forgetting her existence. The curse can only be broken when Śakuntala shows the king the signet ring that he gave her.

She later travels to meet him and has to cross a river. The ring is lost when it slips off her hand as she dips it in the water playfully. On arrival, the king is unable to recognise the woman he married and therefore refuses to acknowledge her. Śakuntala is abandoned by her companions who declares that she should remain with her husband. They then return to the hermitage.

Fortunately, the ring is discovered by a fisherman in the belly of a fish, and he presents it in the king's court. Duṣyanta realises his mistake only too late. He is asked to defeat an army of Asuras, and is rewarded by Indra with a journey through heaven. After returning to Earth years later, Duṣyanta finds Śakuntala and their son by chance and recognises them.

In other versions, especially the one found in the 'Mahābhārata', Śakuntala is not reunited until their son Bharata is born, and found by the king playing with lion cubs. Duṣyanta meets young Bharata and enquires about his parents, and finds out that Bharata is indeed his son. Bharata is an ancestor of the lineages of the Kauravas and Pāṇḍavas, who fought the epic war of the Mahābhārata. It is after this Bharata that India is named "Bhāratavarsha", the 'Land of Bharata'.

== Reception ==
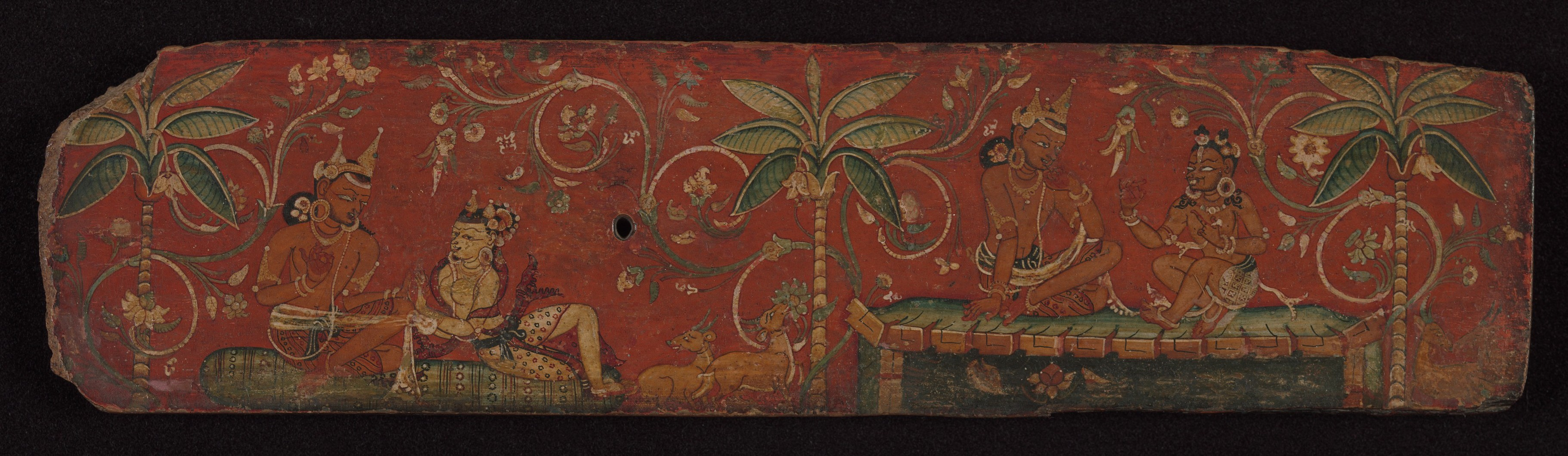
Palm-leaf manuscript cover illustrated with scenes from Kalidasa’s Shakuntala play, Kathmandu Valley, Nepal, circa 12th century

=== Introduction in the West ===
By the 18th century, Western poets were beginning to get acquainted with works of Indian literature and philosophy. Shakuntala was the first Indian drama to be translated into a Western language, by Sir William Jones in 1789. In the next 100 years, there were at least 46 translations in twelve European languages.

Fourth edition (1870 reprint) of William Jones' translation of the Sanskrit play Sacontala by Kālidāsa

Sacontalá or The Fatal Ring, Sir William Jones' translation of Kālidāsa's play, was first published in Calcutta, followed by European republications in 1790, 1792 and 1796. A German (by Georg Forster) and a French version of Jones' translation were published in 1791 and 1803 respectively. Goethe published an epigram about Shakuntala in 1791, and in his Faust he adopted a theatrical convention from the prologue of Kālidāsa's play. Karl Wilhelm Friedrich Schlegel's plan to translate the work into German never materialised, but he did, however, publish a translation of the Mahābhārata version of Śakuntalā's story in 1808. Goethe's epigram goes like this:

Wilt thou the blossoms of spring and the fruits that are later in season,
Wilt thou have charms and delights, wilt thou have strength and support,
Wilt thou with one short word encompass the earth and the heaven,
All is said if I name only, [Shakuntala], thee.

=== Paintings and prints by Raja Ravi Varma ===
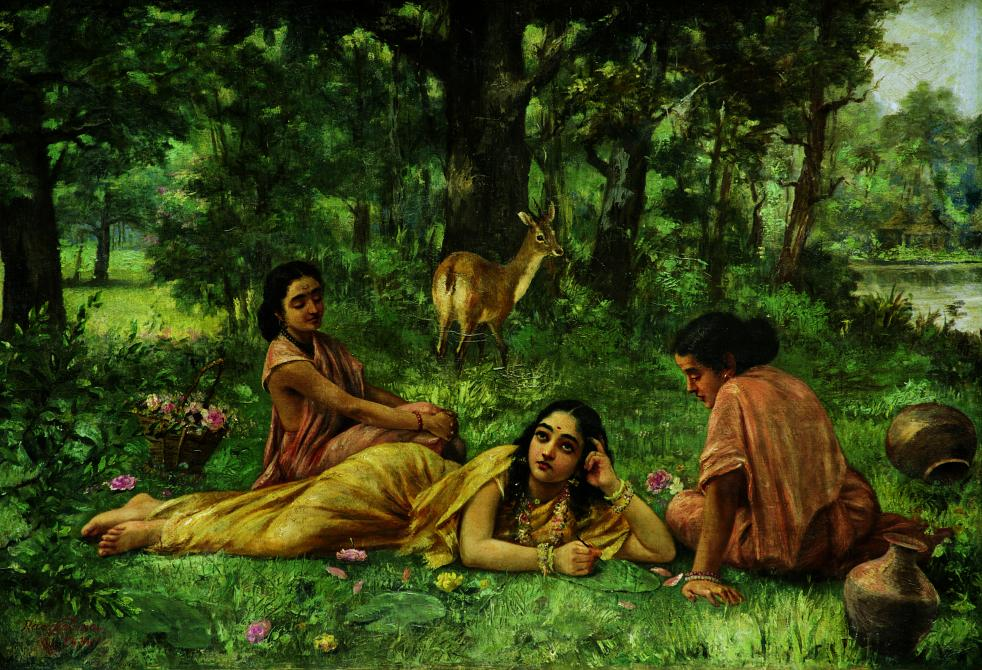
Raja Ravi Varma's Shakuntala Patra-lekhan

Raja Ravi Varma was widely praised for his ability to merge the Western academic painting style with Indian themes. In the 1870s, as he began creating narrative paintings, he drew inspiration from India’s classical heritage—drawing upon the epics, Puranas, and Kalidasa’s plays. His first major work featuring Shakuntala, Shakuntala Patralekhan (Shakuntala Writing a Love Letter to Dushyanta), was painted for the 1876 Madras exhibition. The painting, which depicted Shakuntala lying on the forest floor in a yellow sari, surrounded by her friends and animal companions, won a gold medal and garnered widespread acclaim. It was immediately purchased by the Duke of Buckingham, then Governor of Madras. Though the location of the original painting remains unknown, it was widely reproduced in books and lithographs, including the 1903 publication Ravi Varma: The Indian Artist. Given the colonial fascination with the Abhijnanasakuntalam narrative at the time, Varma was encouraged to create multiple renditions of Shakuntala. His later works included Shakuntala (1888, Maharaja Fatehsingh Museum, Baroda), Shakuntala (1898, Government Museum, Madras), and Shakuntala Looking for Dushyanta (1898, Shri Chitra Art Gallery, Trivandrum). One of his Shakuntala paintings was even selected as the frontispiece for Monier-Williams's 1887 edition of Kalidasa’s play. His most famous painting, Shakuntala Looking for Dushyanta captures the moment when she feigns removing a thorn from her foot while actually glancing back to see if Dushyanta notices her.

Varma’s works were equally admired by Orientalists and Indian nationalists. In 1895, Varma’s first lithographic print, The Birth of Shakuntala, won the "Best Lithograph" prize at the Bombay Art Society’s annual exhibition.

=== Education in British India ===
Monier Williams published an English translation in 1855 while he was teaching at the East India Company College in Hertfordshire. The book made an impact in Victorian Britain and went into several editions. However, Shakuntala was disapproved of as a text for school and college students in the British Raj in the 19th century, as popular Indian literature was deemed, in the words of Charles Trevelyan, to be "marked with the greatest immorality and impurity", and Indian students were thought by colonial administrators to be insufficiently morally and intellectually advanced to read the Indian texts that were taught and praised in Britain.

=== Unfinished opera projects ===
When Leopold Schefer became a student of Antonio Salieri in September 1816, he had been working on an opera about Shakuntala for at least a decade, a project which he did, however, never complete. Franz Schubert, who had been a student of Salieri until at least December of the same year, started composing his Sakuntala opera, D 701, in October 1820. Johann Philipp Neumann based the libretto for this opera on Kālidāsa's play, which he probably knew through one or more of the three German translations that had been published by that time. Schubert abandoned the work in April 1821 at the latest. A short extract of the unfinished score was published in 1829. Also Václav Tomášek left an incomplete Sakuntala opera.

=== New adaptations and editions ===
Kālidāsa's Śakuntalā was the model for the libretto of Karl von Perfall's first opera, which premièred in 1853. In 1853 Monier Monier-Williams published the Sanskrit text of the play. Two years later, he published an English translation of the play, under the title: Śakoontalá or The Lost Ring. A ballet version of Kālidāsa's play, Sacountalâ, on a libretto by Théophile Gautier and with music by Ernest Reyer, was first performed in Paris in 1858. A plot summary of the play was printed in the score edition of Karl Goldmark's Overture to Sakuntala, Op. 13 (1865). Sigismund Bachrich composed a Sakuntala ballet in 1884. Felix Weingartner's opera Sakuntala, with a libretto based on Kālidāsa's play, premièred the same year. Also Philipp Scharwenka's Sakuntala, a choral work on a text by Carl Wittkowsky, was published in 1884.

Bengali translations:

- Shakuntala (1854) by Iswar Chandra Vidyasagar
- Shakuntala (1895) by Abanindranath Tagore

Tamil translations include:

- Abigna Sakuntalam (1938) by Mahavidwan R.Raghava Iyengar. Translated in sandam style.

Felix Woyrsch's incidental music for Kālidāsa's play, composed around 1886, is lost. Ignacy Jan Paderewski would have composed a Shakuntala opera, on a libretto by Catulle Mendès, in the first decade of the 20th century: the work is however no longer listed as extant in overviews of the composer's or librettist's oeuvre. Arthur W. Ryder published a new English translation of Shakuntala in 1912. Two years later, he collaborated on an English performance version of the play. The work was staged at the Greenwich Village Theatre in New York in 1919 with Beatrice Prentice as Śakuntalā, Frank Conroy as Kaṇva (also director for the production), Joseph Macauley as King Duṣyanta, Grace Henderson as Gautami, and Harold Meltzer as Matali.

=== Alfano's opera ===
Italian Franco Alfano composed an opera, named La leggenda di Sakùntala (The legend of Sakùntala) in its first version (1921) and simply Sakùntala in its second version (1952).

=== Further developments ===
Chinese translation:

- 沙恭达罗 (1956) by Ji Xianlin

Fritz Racek's completion of Schubert's Sakontala was performed in Vienna in 1971. Another completion of the opera, by Karl Aage Rasmussen, was published in 2005 and recorded in 2006. A scenic performance of this version was premièred in 2010.

Norwegian electronic musician Amethystium wrote a song called "Garden of Sakuntala" which can be found on the CD Aphelion. According to Philip Lutgendorf, the narrative of the movie Ram Teri Ganga Maili recapitulates the story of Shakuntala.

In Koodiyattam, the only surviving ancient Sanskrit theatre tradition, prominent in the state of Kerala in India, performances of Kālidāsa's plays are rare. However, internationally recognised Kutiyattam artist and Natyashastra scholar Nātyāchārya Vidūshakaratnam Padma Shri Guru Māni Mādhava Chākyār has choreographed a Koodiyattam production of The Recognition of Sakuntala.

A production directed by Tarek Iskander was mounted for a run at London's Union Theatre in January and February 2009. The play is also appearing on a Toronto stage for the first time as part of the Harbourfront World Stage programme. An adaptation by the Magis Theatre Company featuring the music of Indian-American composer Rudresh Mahanthappa had its premiere at La MaMa E.T.C. in New York February 11–28, 2010.

== Film adaptations ==
It is one of the few classical Sanskrit plays that have been adapted to the silver screen in India, and of them the most adapted (another being the Mrichchhakatika by Shudraka). These films, mostly named after the heroine (Shakuntala) include ones in: 1920 by Suchet Singh, 1920 by Shree Nath Patankar, 1929 by Fatma Begum, 1931 by Mohan Dayaram Bhavnani, 1931 by J.J. Madan, 1932 by Sarvottam Badami, 1932 Hindi film, 1940 by Ellis Dungan, 1941 by Jyotish Bannerjee, 1943 by Shantaram Rajaram Vankudre, 1961 by Bhupen Hazarika, 1965 by Kunchacko, 1966 by Kamalakara Kameswara Rao, and 2023 by Gunasekhar. A television film, titled Shakuntalam, was an adaptation of the play by Indian theatre director Vijaya Mehta.

Bharat Ek Khoj, a 1988 Indian historical drama television series by Shyam Benegal based on Jawaharlal Nehru's The Discovery of India (1946), included a two part adaptation of the play and Kalidasa's life which aired on DD National. A television series adaptation of the same name was produced by Sagar Arts and aired on the Indian television channel Star One in 2009.
