= Raja Rishi =

- Theatrical release poster
- Directed by: K. Shankar
- Screenplay by: K. Shankar
- Based on: Viswamithran by A. S. Prakasam
- Produced by: N. Sakunthala
- Starring: Sivaji Ganesan; Prabhu; K. R. Vijaya; Nalini
- Cinematography: M. C. Sekar
- Edited by: K. Shankar; V. Jayapal
- Music by: Ilaiyaraaja
- Production company: Bhairavi Films
- Release date: 20 September 1985
- Running time: 136 minutes
- Country: India
- Language: Tamil

Raja Rishi is a 1985 Indian Tamil-language Hindu mythological film written and directed by K. Shankar. The film stars Sivaji Ganesan, Prabhu, M. N. Nambiar and Nalini. It is based on the play Viswamithran by A. S. Prakasam, which is about the sage Vishvamitra. The film was released on 20 September 1985, and failed at the box office.

== Plot ==
The film narrates the story of Vishwamitra in a linear manner right from him being the King, his run-in with Vasishta over Kamadhenu cow leading him to take a vow that he too would become a brahmarishi like Vasishta. He faces hurdle after hurdle placed in his path by Devendran. In the process, he falls in love, impregnates and abandons Menaka. Their daughter Shakuntala is brought up by another rishi. She falls in love with Dushyanta who is cursed to forget her by Durvasa. When Vishwamitra finds out about this, he goes on to fix her life and in the process learns humility. In the end, with the blessing of Vasishta. who mentions that that was the only thing stopping Vishwamitra from becoming Brahmarishi, he is acknowledged and accredited as one.

== Cast ==
- Sivaji Ganesan as Vishvamitra / Kaushika
- Lakshmi as Menaka
- Nalini as Shakuntala
- Prabhu as King Dushyanta
- M. N. Nambiar as Sage Vashista
- R. S. Manohar as Sage Durvasa
- V. K. Ramasamy as Saint Kanvar
- Radhika as Thilothamai
- Major Sundarrajan as Minister
- LIC Narasimhan as Kanvar Seedan
- Unni Mary as Indirarani
- Vennira Aadai Moorthy as Ammani Husband also Kanvar Seedan
- Srikanth as Devendran
- Y. G. Mahendran as Agni Deva
- Ranganath as Shiva
- K. R. Vijaya as Parvati
- Vijayakumar as Dharmadevan / Yama
- Vanitha Krishnachandran as Ammani
- V. S. Raghavan as Dhasarathan
- A. K. Veerasamy as Janagan

== Production ==
The film was launched at Chitramala Studios. The ashram scenes of Vishwamitra were shot at Vijaya Garden.

== Soundtrack ==
The music was composed by Ilaiyaraaja. The song "Maan Kanden" is set in Vasantha raga.

Song	Singers	Lyrics	Length
"Aadaiyil Aadum"	S. Janaki	Pulamaipithan	04:21
"Maan Kanden"	K. J. Yesudas, Vani Jairam	Pulamaipithan	04:32
"Maathavam Yaen"	S. Janaki	Pulamaipithan	06:16
"Poda Munivaney"	Malaysia Vasudevan	Vaali	04:48
"Shankara Shiva"	Malaysia Vasudevan	Vaali	04:27
"Karunai Kadale" (Azhagiya Kalai Nilave)	Vani Jairam	Muthulingam	04:27

== Critical reception ==
Jayamanmandhan (a duo) of Kalki praised the acting of Sivaji Ganesan, Ilaiyaraaja's music and the film's first half but panned the humour and concluded saying as Vishwamitra gained name from Vashishta, it remains to be seen if he gets the same from audience. Balumani of Anna praised the acting of Ganesan and other actors, Prakasam's dialogues, music and Shankar's direction.
