= Shakuntala (1943 film) =

- Film Poster
- Directed by: V. Shantaram
- Written by: Diwan Sharar (screenplay)
- Screenplay by: Diwan Sharar
- Based on: Abhijñānaśākuntalam by Kālidāsa
- Produced by: V. Shantaram
- Starring: Jayshree; Chandra Mohan; V. Shantaram; Ameena
- Cinematography: V. Avadhoot
- Music by: Vasant Desai
- Production company: Rajkamal Kalamandir
- Distributed by: National Finance of India, Ltd., Delhi, India
- Release date: 1943
- Running time: 122 minutes
- Country: India
- Language: Hindi

Shakuntala is a 1943 drama film based on Kālidāsa's Sanskrit drama Abhijñānaśākuntalam, directed by V. Shantaram. It was the first film made under the newly formed Rajkamal Kalamandir banner that Shantaram had started. It was the first film to be shown commercially in US. Adapted from the Shakuntala of Kalidas the screenplay was by Diwan Sharar. Music was composed by Vasant Desai with lyrics by Diwan Sharar and Ratan Piya. The cinematatography was by V. Avadhoot and the film starred Kumar Ganesh, Jayashree, Chandra Mohan, Ameena, Shantaram, Zohra and Nana Palsikar.

The film initially sticks to the traditional version of Kālidāsa's play but later follows a "transformation" in the form of "empowerment of women" in Shakuntala's role, which is attributed to a critique of the play by Bankim Chatterjee.

== Plot ==
Shakuntala (Jayshree) is the daughter of sage Vishwamitra and Menaka, but is brought up by the sage Kanva who is a good and wise hermit dwelt in his hermitage beside a river. Oneday along the river bank Kanva finds a couple of Shakunt birds watching over a small girl-baby lying in a cradle of leaves and grass, so he takes her to his hut and named her Shakuntala and he raises her up as his own daughter. Shakuntala grows up into a beautiful and gracious maiden. It befell that one day when Kanva was away, Dushayant, the young king of Hastinapur, reached the precincts of the hermitage in pursuit of a deer.

She meets King Dushyanta (Chandra Mohan), when he comes there for a hunt. The two fall in love and get married, with Dushyanta staying with her. Soon he has to leave and he promises to come back for her. Before leaving he gives her a ring as a token of their marriage. Shakuntala passes her days waiting for Dushyanta. She is so lost in his thoughts that she doesn’t hear a sage asking for water. He then leaves her with a curse that the one she is thinking about will forget her. She gives birth to a son, Bharata and several years pass without the return of Dushyanta who has lost his memory and has no recollection of Shakuntala. The ring he has given her is lost in the river and swallowed by a fish. Dushyanta turns her away when Shakuntala goes to the court. Later when Dushyanta recovers his memory Shakuntala refuses to go with him but both are finally united.

== Cast ==
- Kumar Ganesh as Bharat
- Jayashree as Shakuntala
- Chandra Mohan as King Dushyanta
- Shantaram as Priyamvad
- Ameena
- Madan Mohan
- Zohra as Menaka
- Nana Palsikar
- Vilas
- Raja Pandit
- Shantarin
- Vidya

== Review ==
Shakuntala was the first Indian film to be shown in the US. The New York Times of 1947 stated that "Shakuntala has a charm entirely its own". Calling it a "fairy-tale" the reviewer praised the background, and commented on the "unabashed naïveté of acting of the entire cast", and the "crudely rich musical score" but called it "a sturdy screen promise". The film has been cited as a "major hit" and was shown at a theatre in India for continuous 104 weeks.

== Award ==
The film was nominated for the Grand International Award at the 1947 Venice Film Festival.

== Soundtrack ==
The film was composed by Vasant Desai, who had earlier provided background music in Shantaram’s films. This was Desai's first independent music venture and continued to have a long association with Shantaram's films. The lyricists were Diwan Sharar and Ratan Piya. The singers were Jayashree, Zohrabai Ambalewali, Parshuram and Amirbai Karnataki.

=== Song list ===
| # | Title | Singer | Lyricist |
|---|---|---|---|
| 1 | "Jhooloongi Jhooloongi Jeevan Bhar" | Jayashree | Ratan Piya |
| 2 | "Pyari Pyari Ye Sukhad Maatrubhoomi Apni" | Jayashree, Zohrabai Ambalewali, Parshuram | Ratan Piya |
| 3 | "Chand Sa Nanha Aaye" | Jayashree, Zohrabai Ambalewali | Ratan Piya |
| 4 | "Kamal Hai Mere Saamne" | Jayashree | Deewan Sharar |
| 5 | "Tumhe Prasann Yun Dekh Ke" | Jayashree, Zohrabai Ambalewali, Parshuram | Ratan Piya |
| 6 | "Ek Prem Ki Pyasi" | Amirbai Karnataki | Ratan Piya |
| 7 | "Mere Baba Ne Baat Meri" | Jayashree | Ratan Piya |
| 8 | "Kisi Kanya Ko" | Vasant Desai | Deewan Sharar |
| 9 | "Jeevan Ki Naav Na Doley" | Jayashree | Deewan Sharar |
| 10 | "Sukh Bhara Kare Jeevan" | Amirbai Karnataki | Ratan Piya |
| 11 | "Byah Rachaye Chup Chup" | Zohrabai Ambalewali | Deewan Sharar |
| 12 | "Na Jaane Kahan Ka Yeh Jaadoo" | | |
| 13 | "Mere Birah Ki Rain" | | |
