= Sakunthala (1966 film) =

- Theatrical release poster
- Directed by: Kamalakara Kameswara Rao
- Written by: Samudrala Sr (dialogues)
- Based on: Life of Shakuntala
- Produced by: Lakshmi Rajyam; Sridhar Rao
- Starring: N. T. Rama Rao; B. Saroja Devi
- Cinematography: M. A. Rehman
- Edited by: Veerappa
- Music by: Ghantasala
- Production company: Rajyam Productions
- Release date: 3 March 1966
- Running time: 162 mins
- Country: India
- Language: Telugu

Sakunthala is a 1966 Telugu-language Hindu mythological film directed by Kamalakara Kameswara Rao. The film stars N. T. Rama Rao and B. Saroja Devi, with music composed by Ghantasala. It is produced by Lakshmi Rajyam and Sridhar Rao under the Rajyam Productions banner.

== Cast ==
- N. T. Rama Rao as Dushyanta
- B. Saroja Devi as Sakunthala
- Nagayya as Kanva Maharshi
- Relangi as Achigadu, fisherman
- Ramana Reddy as Buchigadu, fisherman
- Padmanabham as Madhavya
- Mukkamala as Visvamitra
- K.V.S.Sharma as Durvasa
- Geetanjali as Anasuya
- Sarada as Priyamvada
- Pushpavalli as Raja Maata
- E. V. Saroja as Menaka
- Nirmalamma as Arya Gowthami
- Baby Kutty Padmini as Bharata
- Vangara as Raja Guru
- Nirmalamma as Gautami
- Allu Ramalingaiah as Gold merchant
- Lanka Satyam as Boatman

== Soundtrack ==
Sakunthala

Film score by Ghantasala
- Released: 1966
- Genre: Soundtrack
- Length: 47:27
- Producer: Ghantasala

Ghantasala chronology
Paramanandayya Sishyula Katha (1966)	Sakunthala (1966)	Paaduka Pattabhishekam (1966)

Music was composed by Ghantasala.

S. No.	Song title	Lyrics	Singers	length
1	"Kanaraa Munisekharaa"	Samudrala Sr.	P. Susheela	3:02
2	"Sadasiva"	Slokam	Ghantasala	0:35
3	"Madhura Madhura"	Aarudhra	P. Susheela	3:55
4	"Anaaghraatam"	Kālidāsa	Ghantasala	1:06
5	"Madilo Mounamugaa"	C. Narayana Reddy	Ghantasala	3:58
6	"Nirdayaa"	Samudrala Sr.	P. Susheela	1:08
7	"Challani"	Kandukuri Veeresalingam	Ghantasala	1:55
8	"Taratama Bhedamu"	Samudrala Sr.	Ghantasala	1:26
9	"Neevu Nenu Kalisina Naade"	C. Narayana Reddy	Ghantasala, P. Susheela	3:34
10	"Sarasana Neevunte"	Dasaradhi	Ghantasala, P. Susheela	3:59
11	"Yaasyestyadjye"	Kālidāsa	Ghantasala	1:23
12	"Guru Janamula"	Samudrala Sr.	Ghantasala	5:23
13	"Chengayi Kattina"	Kosaraju	Ghantasala	3:21
14	"Ammaa Sakunthalaa"	Sri Sri	P. Leela	3:18
15	"Paathaa Kaalam Naati"	Kosaraju	Madhavapeddi Satyam, Pithapuram, Raghavulu	2:41
16	"Naa Kanti Papa Vainaa"	Dasaradhi	P. Susheela	3:34
17	"Ammaa Saranammaa"	Samudrala Sr.	P. Susheela	3:09
