= Shakuntala =

Heroine in ancient Indian literature

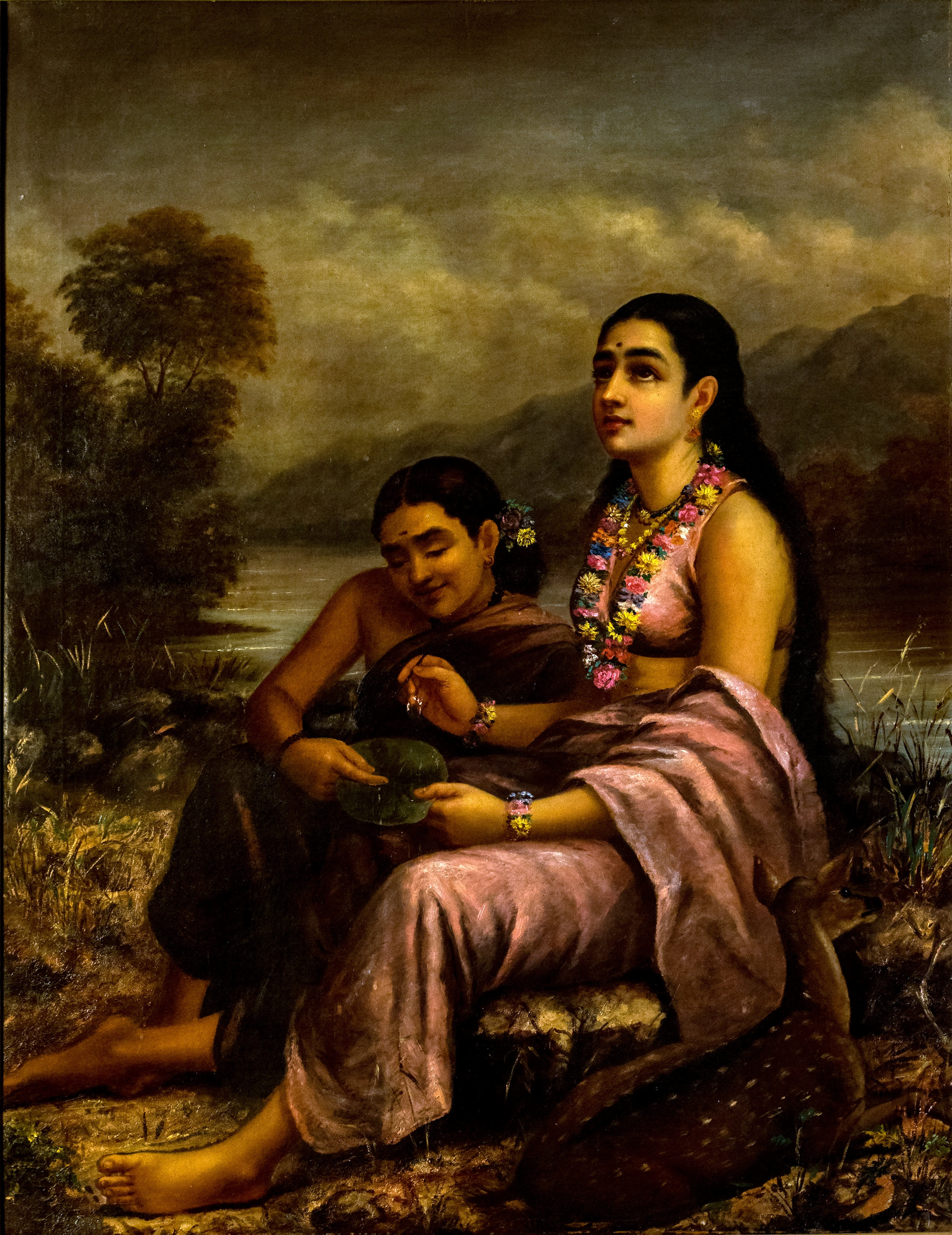
- Shakuntala writing a love letter to Dushyanta, a scene from the play painted by Raja Ravi Varma

Personal Information
- Family: Vishvamitra (father); Menaka (mother); Kanva (adoptive father)
- Spouse: Dushyanta
- Children: Bharata

Shakuntala (Sanskrit: शकुन्तला, romanized: Śakuntalā) is a heroine in ancient Indian literature, best known for her portrayal in the ancient Sanskrit play Abhijnanashakuntalam (The Recognition of Shakuntala), written by the classical poet Kalidasa in the 4th or 5th century AD. Her story, however, originates in the Hindu epic, the Mahabharata (c. 400 BC - 400 AD), where she appears in the Adi Parva ("The Book of Beginnings"). In both narratives, Shakuntala is the daughter of the sage Vishvamitra and the celestial nymph Menaka. Abandoned at birth, she is raised by the sage Kanva in a forest hermitage. She later falls in love with King Dushyanta and becomes the mother of Bharata, a celebrated emperor of India.

In the Mahabharata, Shakuntala introduces herself to Dushyanta when he visits her hermitage during a hunting expedition in the absence of her foster father, Kanva. The two fall in love and secretly marry according to the Gandharva tradition (a love marriage), consummating their union in the forest. Afterward, Dushyanta returns to his palace life, while Shakuntala raises their son Bharata in Kanva's hermitage for 6 years. When she approaches Dushyanta with their son, he hesitates to acknowledge them despite remembering her. Outspoken and fearless, Shakuntala rebukes him forcefully until a celestial voice intervenes to confirm the truth, compelling Dushyanta to accept her and their son.

Abhijnanashakuntalam dramatizes the story with poetic elegance but reimagines Shakuntala as a more passive and naive figure. In this version, her introduction to King Dushyanta is made by her friends, Priyamvada and Anasuya. After Dushyanta departs from the hermitage, Shakuntala, lost in thoughts of him, fails to greet the irascible sage Durvasa, who curses her so that Dushyanta will forget her entirely. The curse can only be lifted if he sees a token of their love—a signet ring he had given her. The now-pregnant Shakuntala journeys to the palace, but she loses the ring in a river and is rejected by Dushyanta, who fails to recognise her. Humiliated and abandoned, she is lifted away by celestial beings to her divine mother Menaka's abode. The lost ring is later found in a fish's belly and returned to Dushyanta, restoring his memory. Overcome with remorse, he longs for Shakuntala, and in time, reunites with her—now with their son, Bharata.

Shakuntala has long been regarded as a significant cultural figure and a symbol of Indian womanhood, inspiring numerous literary, artistic, and visual adaptations. In modern scholarship, the contrast between her portrayals in the Mahabharata and Abhijnanashakuntalam is frequently highlighted, particularly in discussions of gender, agency, and narrative tone.

== Legend ==
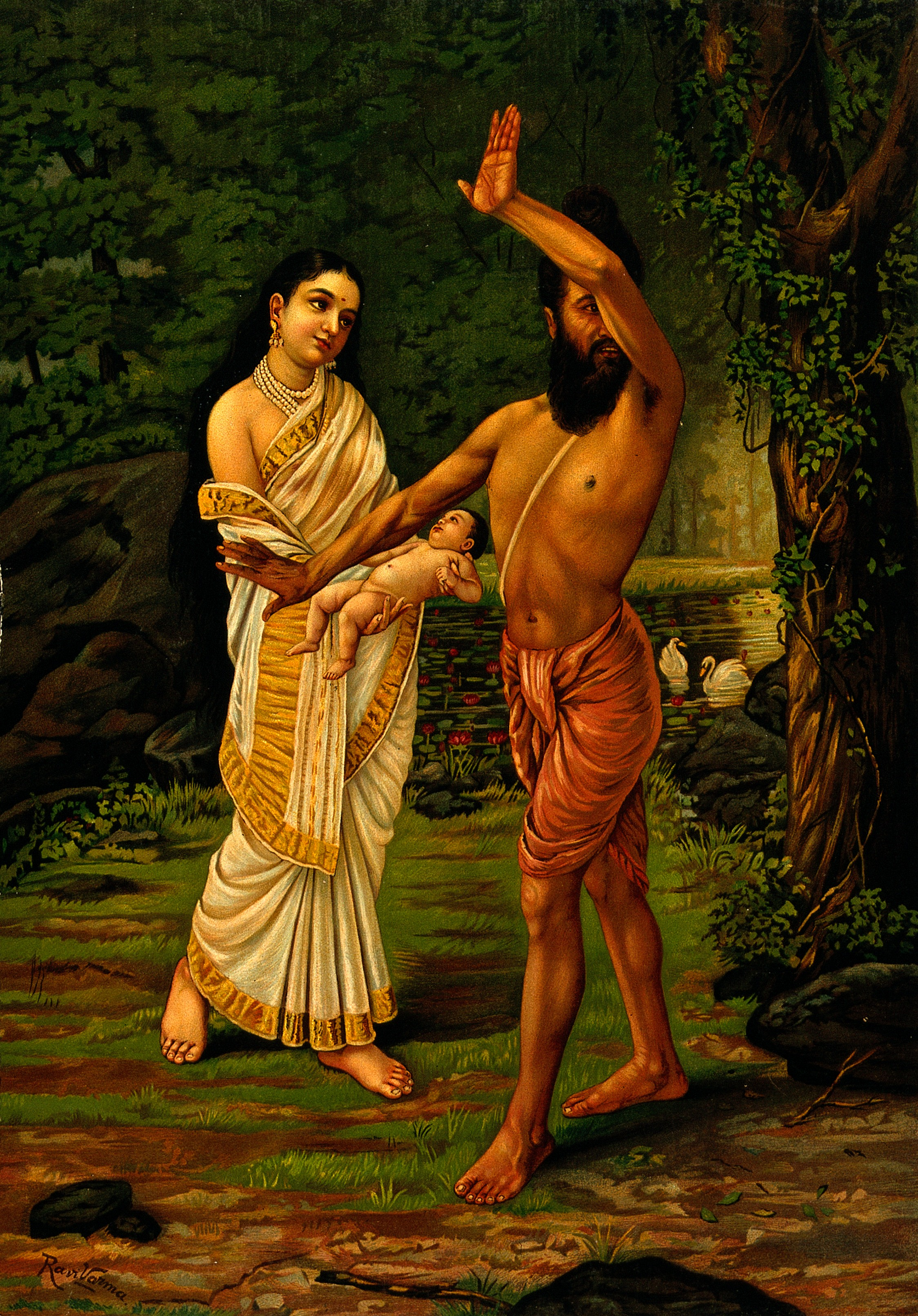
The Birth of Shakuntala, one of the most famous lithographs by Raja Ravi Varma, depicting Vishvamitra rejecting Menaka and his daughter.

There are two different stories of Shakuntala's life. The first version is the one described in Mahabharata, one of the two major Hindu epics traditionally attributed to the sage Vyasa. This story had been adapted as the play by the 4th–5th century AD poet Kalidasa.

=== Mahabharata ===
According to Vyasa's Mahabharata, Sage Vishvamitra undertakes intense penance to attain the status of a Brahmarshi. Concerned by the severity of his meditation, Indra (king of gods) fears a potential challenge to his authority and seeks to disrupt his penance. To this end, he dispatches Menaka, an apsara, to distract him. Menaka arrives at Vishvamitra's meditation site and engages him in conversation, ultimately leading him away from his ascetic practice. Vishvamitra and Menaka reside together for a period, during which a daughter is born. In time, Vishvamitra discerns Indra's intervention and resolves to resume his ascetic pursuits. He departs, and Menaka, before returning to heaven, leaves the child near the hermitage of Sage Kanva. Sage Kanva discovers the infant surrounded by śakunta birds and names her Shakuntala, signifying "one protected by śakunta".

In the Adi Parva of Mahabharata, Kanva says:

She was surrounded in the solitude of the wilderness by śakuntas,
therefore, hath she been named by me Shakuntala (Shakunta-protected).

Years later, Dushyanta, King of Hastinapur encounters Shakuntala in Kanva's hermitage while hunting in the forest. In the absence of Kanva, the two developed mutual affection and married according to the Gandharva tradition. After spending some time together, Dushyanta returned to his kingdom, and Shakuntala became pregnant.

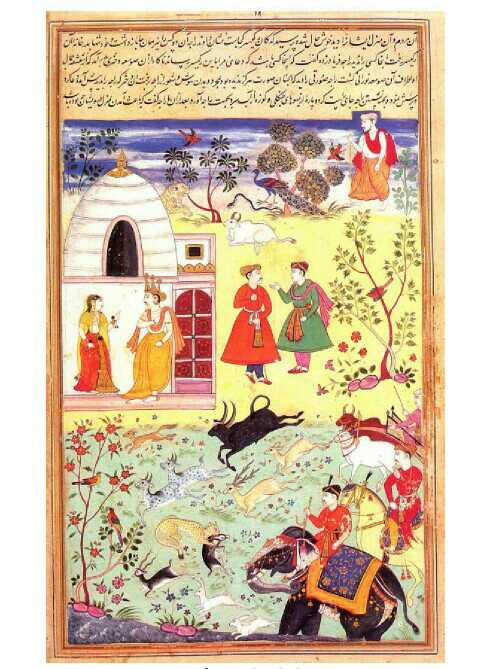
Dushyanta meet Shakuntala, from a folio of Razmnama, the 16th century Persian translation of the Mahabharata

Upon Kanva's return, he accepts the marriage as part of divine destiny. In due course, Shakuntala gives birth to a son, named Sarvadamana due to his ability to overpower everyone, including animals like lions. Seeing the boy's prowess, Kanva decides it is time for Shakuntala to present him to Dushyanta. Shakuntala, with her son, is escorted by Kanva's students and reaches the royal court and introduces him to the king, urging him to fulfill his promise and acknowledge their child as his heir.

Dushyanta, however, denies any memory of their union and dismisses Shakuntala's claim. Stunned, she quickly regains her composure and rebukes him for his dishonor. She reminds him that truth is the foundation of righteousness and warns that the gods, who witness all actions, will judge him. Despite her impassioned plea, Dushyanta refuses to accept the boy, mocking her lineage. At that moment, a celestial voice resounds from the heavens, confirming Shakuntala's words. It declares that the son is indeed Dushyanta's and must be recognized. The voice further proclaims that because the king is commanded to cherish him, the boy shall be named Bharata, meaning "the cherished one". Realizing his error, Dushyanta joyfully accepts his son and formally installs him as heir. Embracing Bharata, he seeks Shakuntala's forgiveness, explaining that he had only delayed recognition to ensure the child's legitimacy. Under Bharata's rule, the kingdom flourishes, and he becomes a legendary monarch, earning the title of Chakravarti, a universal ruler. His reign is marked by justice, prosperity, and grand sacrifices, including the horse sacrifice. From his name, the land of India comes to be known as Bharatavarsha, cementing his legacy for generations to come.

=== Abhijnanashakuntalam ===
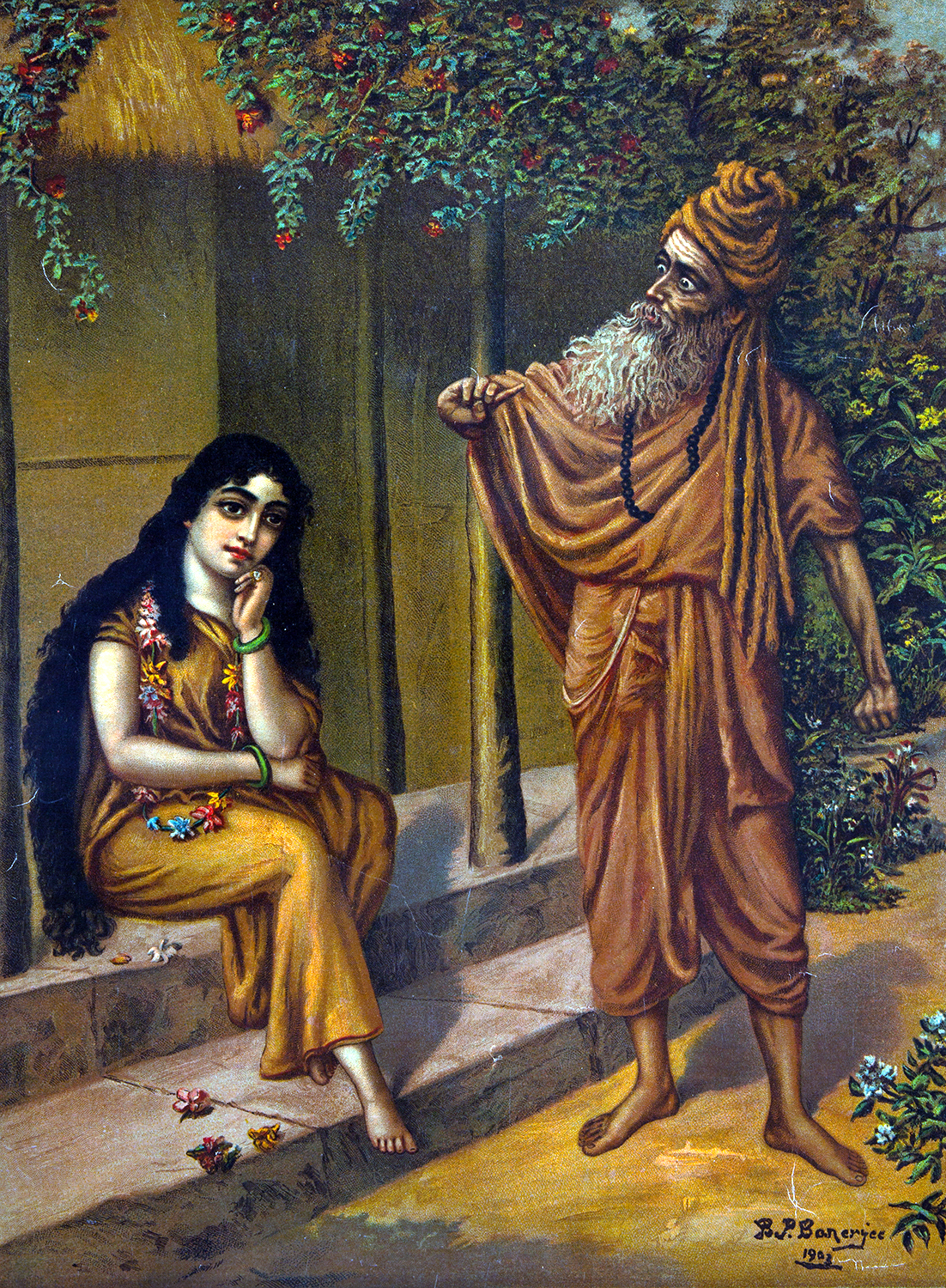
Kalidasa's version features much dramatized variant of the tale. One of Kalidasa's additions include the sage Durvasa cursing Shakuntala (pictured)

Kalidasa reworked the story of Shakuntala into a dramatic form, introducing additional elements such as a curse and a lost signet ring to create a more complex narrative. Many scholars consider the Kalidasa's version more literary acclaimed and influential.

In Abhijnanamshakuntalam, Shakuntala is the daughter of Vishvamitra and Menaka, and is raised in Kanva's hermitage alongside her companions Anasuya and Priyamvada. She encounters Dushyanta during a hunting expedition. Captivated by her beauty, grace, and modesty, Dushyanta learns from her Anasuya and Priyamvada that she is of royal birth despite her upbringing in the ashram. Enamored by her, Dushyanta courts Shakuntala, and their mutual attraction blossoms into love. Overwhelmed by his emotions, Dushyanta convinces Shakuntala to marry him through the gandharva rite, a form of spontaneous union that does not require formal rituals or parental approval. The two consummate their love, and Dushyanta promises to return for her after fulfilling his royal duties. Before departing, he gives Shakuntala a signet ring as a token of remembrance.

While deeply engrossed in thoughts of Dushyanta, Shakuntala inadvertently offends the irascible sage Durvasa by failing to notice his arrival. Feeling slighted by her inattention, Durvasa curses her, declaring that the one she loves will forget her entirely. Although her companions plead for mercy, the sage, unable to revoke the curse, grants a reprieve: Dushyanta's memory will be restored only when he sees the token of their love. Unaware of the full consequences of the curse, Shakuntala waits for Dushyanta's return. When Kanva learns of her condition, he prepares for her departure to Dushyanta's court, entrusting her to his disciples Sharadvata and Sharngarava. Along the way, while crossing a river, Shakuntala accidentally loses the signet ring when it slips from her finger and falls into the water, unnoticed.

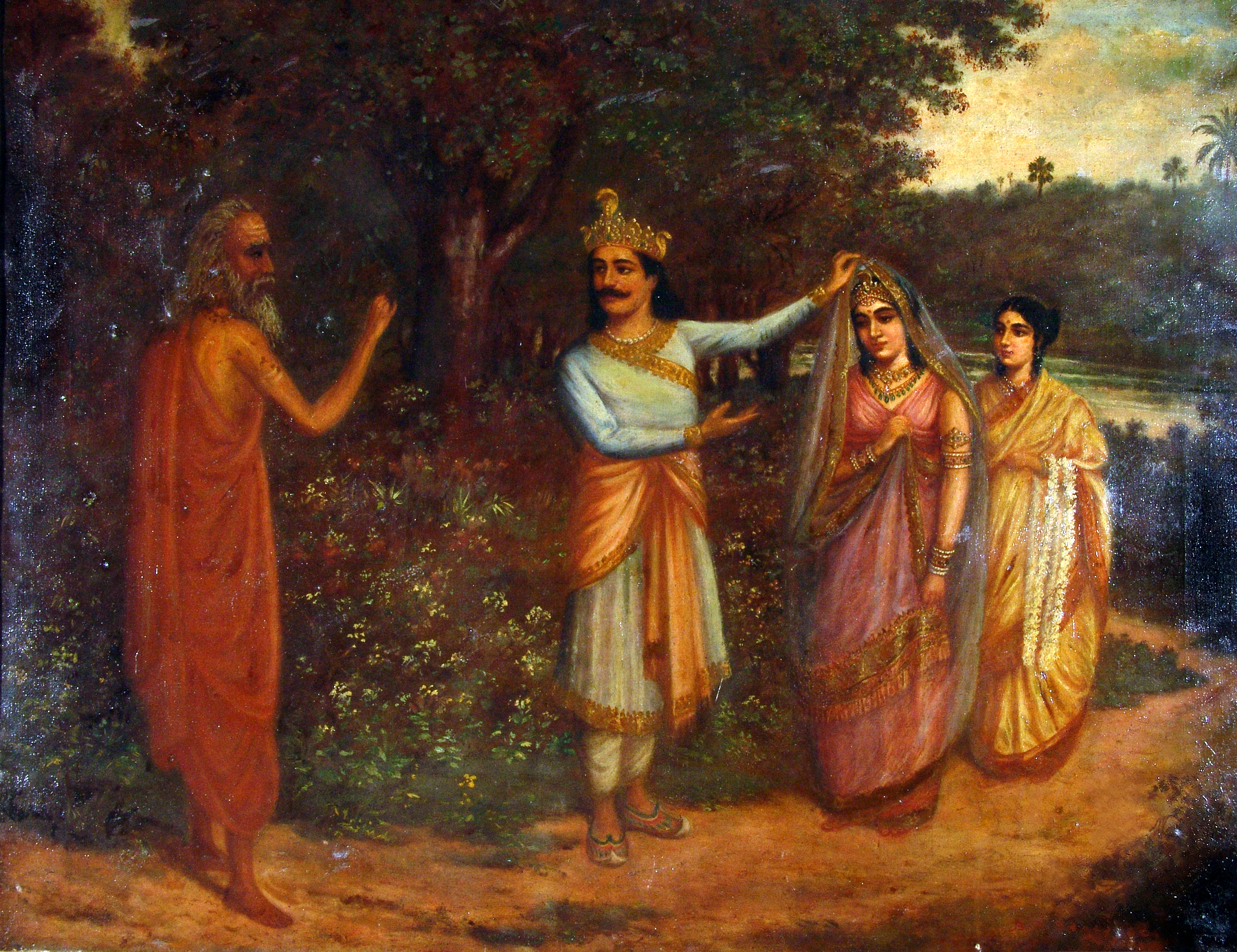
Shakuntala leaving for her husband king Dushyanta's palace

Upon reaching Dushyanta's palace, Shakuntala confidently presents herself as his wife. However, because of the curse, Dushyanta does not recognize her and denies any knowledge of their marriage. The courtiers regard her with suspicion, and without the ring as proof of her identity, her claims appear baseless. Humiliated and heartbroken, Shakuntala laments her fate. In an act of divine intervention, she is suddenly lifted away by celestial beings to her mother Menaka's realm in the heavens, sparing her further disgrace at court. Dushyanta, despite his rejection, is deeply unsettled by the encounter and feels an inexplicable sadness, though he cannot understand its cause.

Time passes, and one day a fisherman catches a fish in whose stomach he finds the royal signet ring. Recognizing it as Dushyanta's, he returns it to the king. The moment Dushyanta sees the ring, his memories flood back, and he is struck with immense guilt and sorrow. Realizing that he has wronged Shakuntala, he is tormented by remorse and desperately seeks a way to reunite with her, but she has vanished, leaving him to wander in anguish. In his despair, Dushyanta embarks on a campaign to defeat a group of demons, earning divine favor along the way. During his journey, he arrives at the hermitage of the celestial sage Marichi, where he unexpectedly encounters a young boy playing with a lion cub. The child, fearless and noble, immediately captures Dushyanta's attention. The boy, named Bharata, is revealed to be his own son—a fact Dushyanta had not known. The sage explains that Bharata is indeed his son and that Shakuntala has been living in the celestial realm all along. At last, Dushyanta and Shakuntala are reunited, their love restored and strengthened by the trials they endured. Now a mature and dignified woman, Shakuntala forgives Dushyanta, and they are finally recognized as husband and wife.

Ancient renditions of the myth of Shakuntala (2nd century BC, Shunga period)
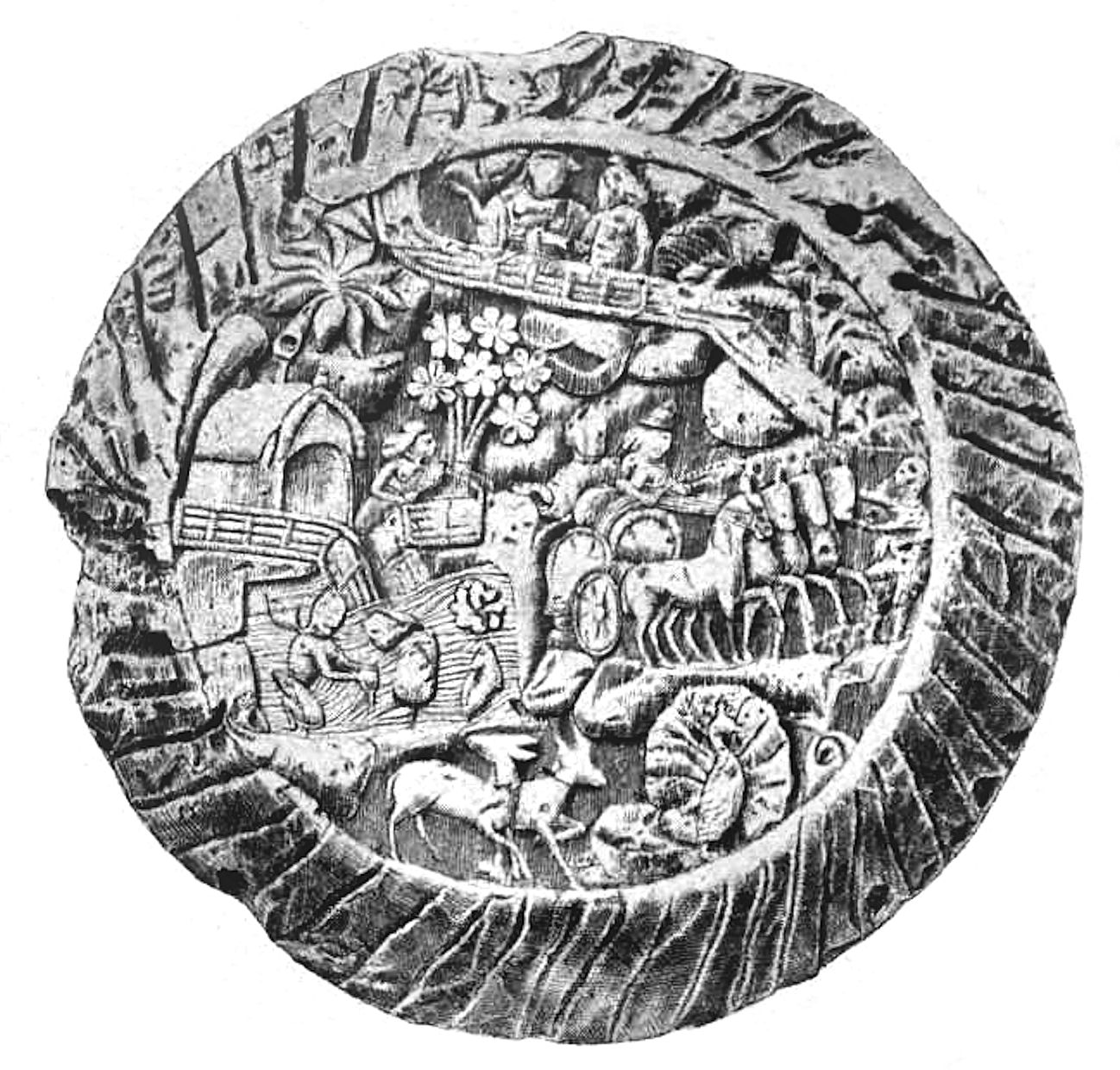
The Bhita plaque

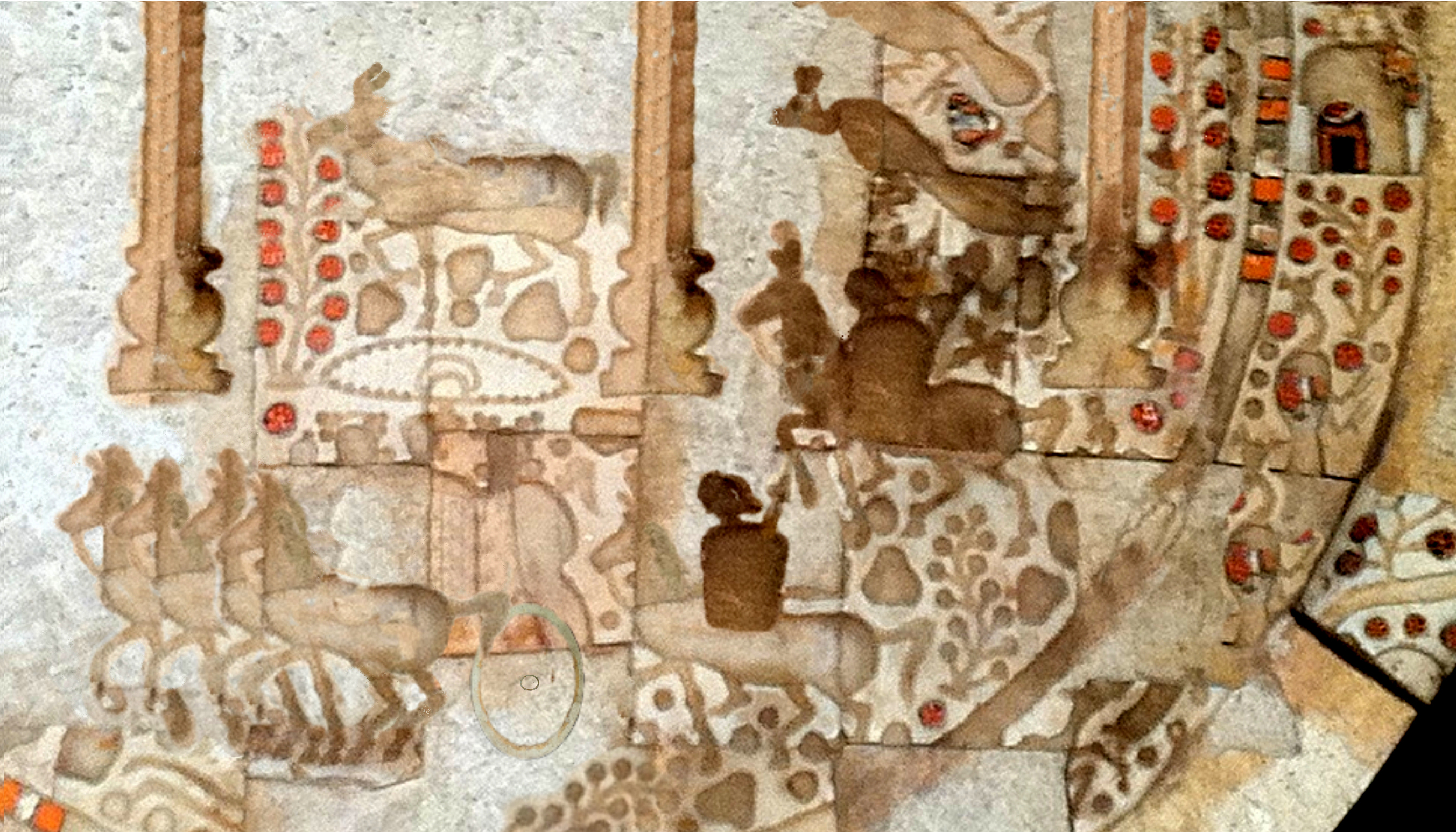
The Indian plaque of Ai-Khanoum

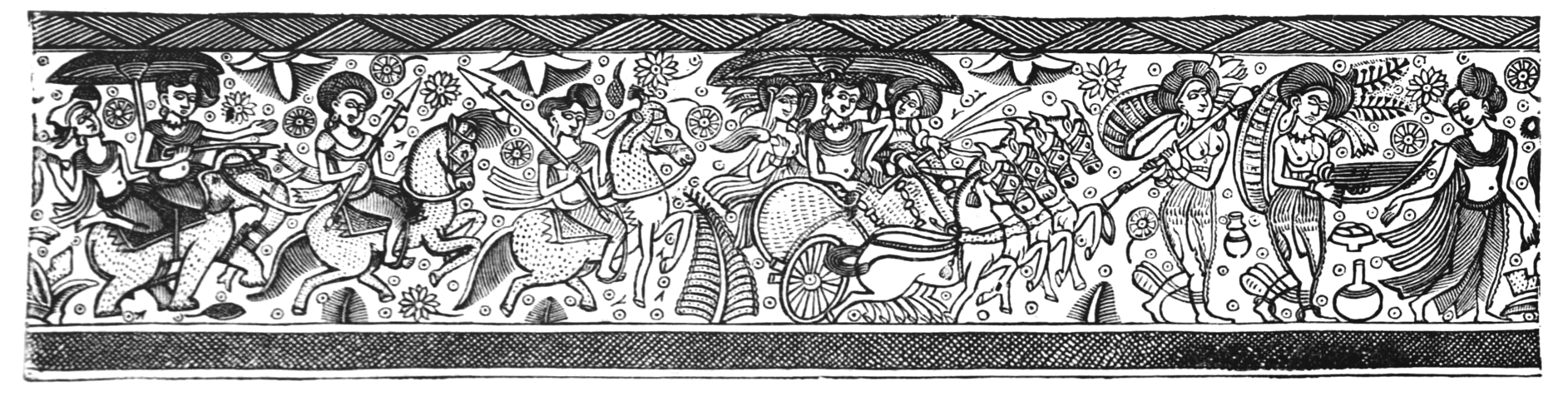
The Kulu Vase

== Influence ==
=== Arts ===
==== Raja Ravi Varma ====
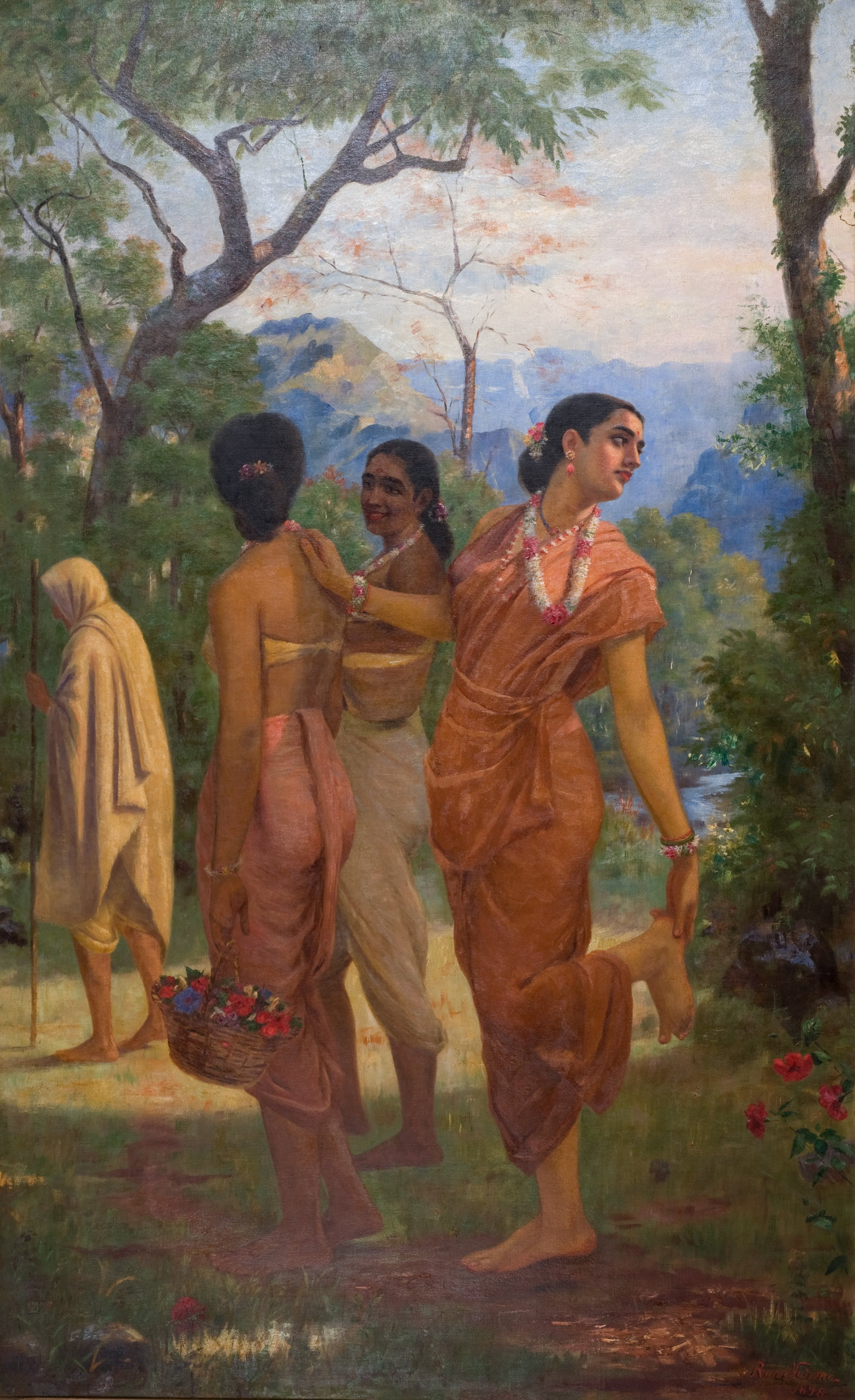
Shakuntala has inspired many artworks, including Raja Ravi Varma's Shakuntala looking for Dushyanta, depicting her pretending thorn removal from feet while looking for Dushyanta.

Raja Ravi Varma was widely praised for his ability to merge the Western academic painting style with Indian themes. In the 1870s, as he began creating narrative paintings, he drew inspiration from India's classical heritage—drawing upon the epics, Puranas, and Kalidasa's plays. His first major work featuring Shakuntala, Shakuntala Patralekhan (Shakuntala Writing a Love Letter to Dushyanta), was painted for the 1876 Madras exhibition. The painting, which depicted Shakuntala lying on the forest floor in a yellow sari, surrounded by her friends and animal companions, won a gold medal and garnered widespread acclaim. It was immediately purchased by the Duke of Buckingham, then Governor of Madras. Though the location of the original painting remains unknown, it was widely reproduced in books and lithographs, including the 1903 publication Ravi Varma: The Indian Artist. Given the colonial fascination with the Abhijnanasakuntalam narrative at the time, Varma was encouraged to create multiple renditions of Shakuntala. His later works included Shakuntala (1888, Maharaja Fatehsingh Museum, Baroda), Shakuntala (1898, Government Museum, Madras), and Shakuntala Looking for Dushyanta (1898, Shri Chitra Art Gallery, Trivandrum). One of his Shakuntala paintings was even selected as the frontispiece for Monier-Williams' 1887 edition of Kalidasa's play. His most famous painting, Shakuntala Looking for Dushyanta captures the moment when she feigns removing a thorn from her foot while actually glancing back to see if Dushyanta notices her.

Varma's works were equally admired by Orientalists and Indian nationalists. In 1895, Varma's first lithographic print, The Birth of Shakuntala, won the "Best Lithograph" prize at the Bombay Art Society's annual exhibition. The choice of this subject was highly symbolic; by this time, Shakuntala had come to represent an idealized vision of Indian womanhood. Within the context of colonial modernity, her birth was seen not just as the emergence of India's ancestral matriarch but also as a metaphorical rebirth of the ideal Hindu woman—an embodiment of the virtues that both Orientalists and Indian nationalists sought to define in the image of the "modern" Indian woman.

=== Sculpture ===
Camille Claudel created a sculpture Shakuntala.

=== Theatre, literature and music ===
==== Opera ====
Sakuntala is an incomplete opera by Franz Schubert, which was started in October 1820. In 1884 the first Opera of the 21-year-old Austrian composer Felix Weingartner had its debut performance in Weimar and was supported by Franz Liszt to bring it to stage. Italian Franco Alfano composed an opera named La leggenda di Sakùntala (The legend of Shakuntala) in its first version (1921) and simply Sakùntala in its second version (1952).

==== Ballet ====
- Ernest Reyer (1823–1909) composed a ballet Sacountala on a work by Théophile Gautier in 1838.
- The Soviet composer Sergey Balasanian (1902–1982) composed a ballet named Shakuntala (premiere 28 December 1963, Riga).

==== Other literature ====
Ishwar Chandra Vidyasagar created a novel in Sadhu bhasha, Bengali. It was among the first translations from Bengali. Abanindranath Tagore later wrote in the Chalit Bhasa (which is a simpler literary variation of Bengali) mainly for children and preteens.

By the 18th century, Western poets were beginning to get acquainted with works of Indian literature and philosophy. The German poet Goethe read Kalidasa's play and has expressed his admiration for the work in the following verses:

Willst du die Blüthe des frühen, die Früchte des späteren Jahres,
Willst du, was reizt und entzückt, willst du was sättigt und nährt,
Willst du den Himmel, die Erde, mit Einem Namen begreifen;
Nenn' ich, Sakuntala, Dich, und so ist Alles gesagt.

— Goethe, 1791
Translation:

Wouldst thou the young year's blossoms and the fruits of its decline
And all by which the soul is charmed, enraptured, feasted, fed,
Wouldst thou the earth and heaven itself in one sole name combine?
I name thee, O Sakuntala! and all at once is said.

— translation by Edward Eastwick

In 1808 Friedrich Schlegel published a German translation of the Shakuntala story from the Mahabharata.

=== Film and TV ===
A significant number of Indian films have been made on the story of Shakuntala. These include: Shakuntala (1920) by Suchet Singh, Shakuntala (1920) by S. N. Patankar, Shakuntala (1929) by Fatma Begum, Shakuntala (1931) by Mohan Dayaram Bhavnani, Shakuntala (1931) by J.J. Madan, Sakunthala (1932) by Sarvottam Badami, Shakuntala (1932), Shakuntala (1940) by Ellis Dungan, Shakuntala (1941) by Jyotish Bannerjee, Shakuntala (1943) by V. Shantaram, Shakuntala (1961) by Bhupen Hazarika, Shakuntala (1965) by Kunchacko, Sakunthala (1966) by Kamalakara Kameswara Rao, Stree by V. Shantaram.

The 2009 Indian television show, Shakuntala, was an adaptation of the play by Kalidasa.

Films and Television Shows depicting Shakuntala
Year	Films and Television Shows	Portrayed by	Directed by
1920	Shakuntala	Dorothy Kingdom	Suchet Singh
1920	Shakuntala		Shree Nath Patankar
1929	Shakuntala		Fatma Begum
1931	Shakuntala	Khurshid Begum	Mohan Dayaram Bhavnani
1931	Shakuntala		J.J. Madan
1932	Sakunthala	Surabhi Kamalabai	Sarvottam Badami
1940	Sakuntalai	M. S. Subbulakshmi	Ellis R. Dungan
1941	Shakuntala	Jyotsna Gupta	Jyotish Bannerjee
1943	Shakuntala	Jayashree	V. Shantaram
1961	Shakuntala	Amala Katarki	Bhupen Hazarika
1961	Stree	Sandhya Shantaram	V. Shantaram
1965	Sakunthala	K. R. Vijaya	Kunchacko
1966	Shakuntala	Saroja Devi	Kamalakara Kameswara Rao
1985	Anantyatra	Anuradha Patel	Jayoo Patwardhan, Nachiket Patwardhan
1985	Raja Rishi	Nalini	K. Shankar
1988	Bharat Ek Khoj	Pallavi Joshi	Shyam Benegal
1991	Brahmarshi Viswamitra	Madhumita	N. T. Rama Rao
2000	Gaja Gamini	Madhuri Dixit	M. F. Husain
2009	Shakuntala	Neha Mehta	Various
2021	Sakuntalam †	Payal Shetty	Dushyanth Sridhar
2023	Shaakuntalam	Samantha	Gunasekhar

== Sources ==
- Dorothy Matilda Figueira. Translating the Orient: The Reception of Sakuntala in Nineteenth-Century Europe. SUNY Press, 1991. ISBN 0791403270
- Romila Thapar. Sakuntala: Texts, Readings, Histories. Columbia University Press, 2011. ISBN 0231156553
- Vyasa. Mahabharata.
- https://m.youtube.com/watch?v=N5eTQewvteg&t=110s
