= Shakuntala (TV series) =

Indian mythological television series

- Promotional logo
- Based on: Shakuntala by Kālidāsa
- Directed by: Dharmesh Shah; Mukesh kumar Singh; Noel Smith; Swapnil Mahaling )
- Country of origin: India
- Original language: Hindi
- No. of episodes: 104

Production
- Running time: 24 minutes
- Production company: Sagar Pictures

Original release
- Network: STAR One
- Release: 2 February – 6 July 2009

Shakuntala is an Indian television series that premiered on 2 February 2009 and aired until 6 July 2009. The show was based on characters in Hinduism where Shakuntala (Sanskrit: शकुन्तला, Śakuntalā) is married to Dushyanta and the mother of Emperor Bharata. Her story is told in the Mahabharata and dramatized by Kalidasa in his play Abhijñānaśākuntala (The Sign of Shakuntala).

== Plot ==
The story is a fairy tale about a baby who was found by the Sage Kanva and given refuge in his ashram. He raises her like his own daughter. Shakuntala meets King Dushyanta who is completely smitten. He approaches her, wins her heart, and gives her his Royal seal, his Ring. Circumstances separate Shakuntala from King Dushyant, and she pines for her love to return.

== Cast ==
- Neha Mehta as Shakuntala
- Gautam Sharma as Rajkumar Dushyant
- Javed Khan as Maharaja Puru
- Aaina Mehta as Young Shakuntala
- Abhileen as Young Dushyant
- Shreya Laheri as Young Karuna
- Sunny Nijar as Karan
- Gagan Malik as Senapati Veer
- Madhura Naik / Payel Sarkar as Rajkumari Gauri
- Shabana Mulani as Rajkumari Kalki
- Vicky Batra as Rajkumar Mritunjaya
- Rohit Singh Rana as Rajkumar Arnav
- Salina Prakash as Rundi
- Nandani as Ragini (Gauri's Friend)
- Simran Khanna as Priyamvada
- Sonali K. as Anusuya
- Deepali Pansare As Gauri's Friend
- Digangana Suryavanshi as Young Rajkumari Gauri
- Vaishali Thakkar as Maharani Gandhari
- Jalina Thakur as Jeti maa Bai
- Payel Sarkar as Rajkumri Gauri
- Aaina Mehta as Young Shakuntala
- Digangana Suryavanshi as Young Gauri
