= Sakuntalai =

- Theatrical release poster
- Directed by: Ellis R. Dungan
- Screenplay by: T. Sadasivam
- Story by: Kalidasa
- Starring: M. S. Subbulakshmi; G. N. Balasubramaniam
- Cinematography: Caridi Cuttak
- Edited by: Ellis R. Dungan; G. K. Bhaskar
- Music by: Thuraiyur Rajagopala Sharma
- Art by: Nagoor
- Production companies: Rayal Talkie Distributors; Chandra Prabha Cinetone
- Distributed by: Rayal Talkie Distributors
- Release date: 12 December 1940
- Country: India
- Language: Tamil

Sakuntalai is a 1940 Indian Tamil-language film directed by Ellis R. Dungan and starring M. S. Subbulakshmi and G. N. Balasubramaniam.

== Plot ==
Sakuntalai is the story of the mythological queen Shakuntala, whose tale is told in the Mahabharata and dramatised by Kalidasa in the play Abhijñānaśākuntalam.

== Cast ==
Male cast

- G. N. Balasubramaniam B.A.(Hons.) as Dushyanta
- Serukalathur Sama as Kanwa
- S. R. Kalyanasundaram as Saradwata
- T. P. S. Mani as Durvasa
- K. Sarangapani as Madhavya
- N. S. Krishnan and T. S. Durairaj as Fishermen
- P. G. Venkatesan as Cartman

Female cast

- M. S. Subbulakshmi as Sakuntalai
- Radha as Bharata
- T. A. Mathuram as Priyamvada
- Sakuntala Bai as Anasuya
- Golden Saradambal as Gouthami
- M. S. Ramani as Sarangrava
- K. Thavamani Devi as Menaka

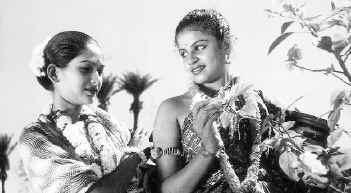
K. Thavamani Devi and M. S. Subbulakshmi in Sakuntalai

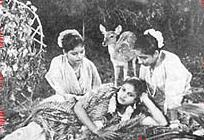
M. S. Subbulakshmi in Sakuntalai

== Production ==
Subbulakshmi and her husband T. Sadasivam formed Royal Talkies to produce their own films. They decided to make a movie based on Shakuntala's life and asked director K. Subramanyam, to direct the film. Subramaniam was not able to do so because of prior commitments and recommended Ellis Dungan to be hired instead. Sadasivam wrote the screenplay and Papanasam Sivan was hired to write the lyrics. Carnatic singer G. N. Balasubramaniam was cast as King Dushyanta. The comedic duo of N. S. Krishnan – T. A. Mathuram were also among the cast. Dungan introduced several new techniques to Tamil cinema in this film. The scene where Shakuntala loses her ring was shot in slow motion through a glass tank filled with water. In his autobiography (A Guide to Adventure: An Autobiography, Dorrance Publishing Company (2002)), Dungan wrote the following about his use of a European dancer for adding glamour to the film :

I hired a scantily dressed female dancer for the role of a water nymph. She was a young European girl in her late twenties, possessing a beautiful Venus-type figure, who performed acrobatic dances with a male partner in cabaret shows at the Connemara Hotel in Madras. In an unheard-of technique in Indian films, she came up out of a water tank and danced in her rather skin-tight one-piece bathing suit. Believe me, it created quite a bit of excitement among the Indian actors and film.

The completed film was 17,400 Feet in length (around 3 hours run time). The film advanced the popularity of singing lead actress M. S. Subbulakshmi.

== Soundtrack ==
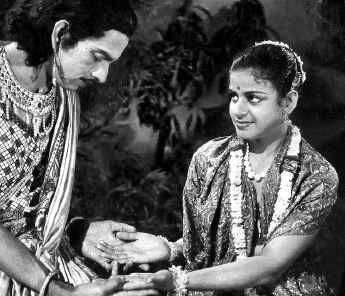
G. N. Balasubramaniam and M. S. Subbulakshmi in Sakuntalai

The music was composed by Thuraiyur Rajagopala Sarma while the lyrics were penned by Papanasam Sivan. There were a total of 24 songs in Sakuntalai. A couple of songs were longer than usual and the gramophone company had to issue special large sized records for them.

A partial list of songs in the film:

1. "Endhan Idadhu Tholum Kannum" – M. S. Subbulakshmi (Karaharapriya)
2. "Manamogananga Anangae" – M. S. Subbulakshmi, G. N. Balasubramaniam
3. "Premayil Yavum Marandenae" – M. S. Subbulakshmi, G. N. Balasubramaniam
4. "Engum Nirai Nadha Bramammae" – M. S. Subbulakshmi
5. "Vegudooram Kadal Thandi Povomae" – N. S. Krishnan, T. S. Durairaj
6. "Innaikku Kalaila Elundiruchu" – N. S. Krishnan, T. S. Durairaj
7. "Anandam En Solvaenae" – M. S. Subbulakshmi (Sindhu Bhairavi)
8. "Sugumara En Thabam" – M. S. Subbulakshmi (Behag)
9. "Pannedum Naalaai" – M. S. Subbulakshmi (NadhaNaamakriya)
10. "Manam Kulira, Ullam Kulira" – M. S. Subbulakshmi

== Reception ==
The film was released on 12 December 1940 and was a box office success.
