= Sakuntala (opera) =

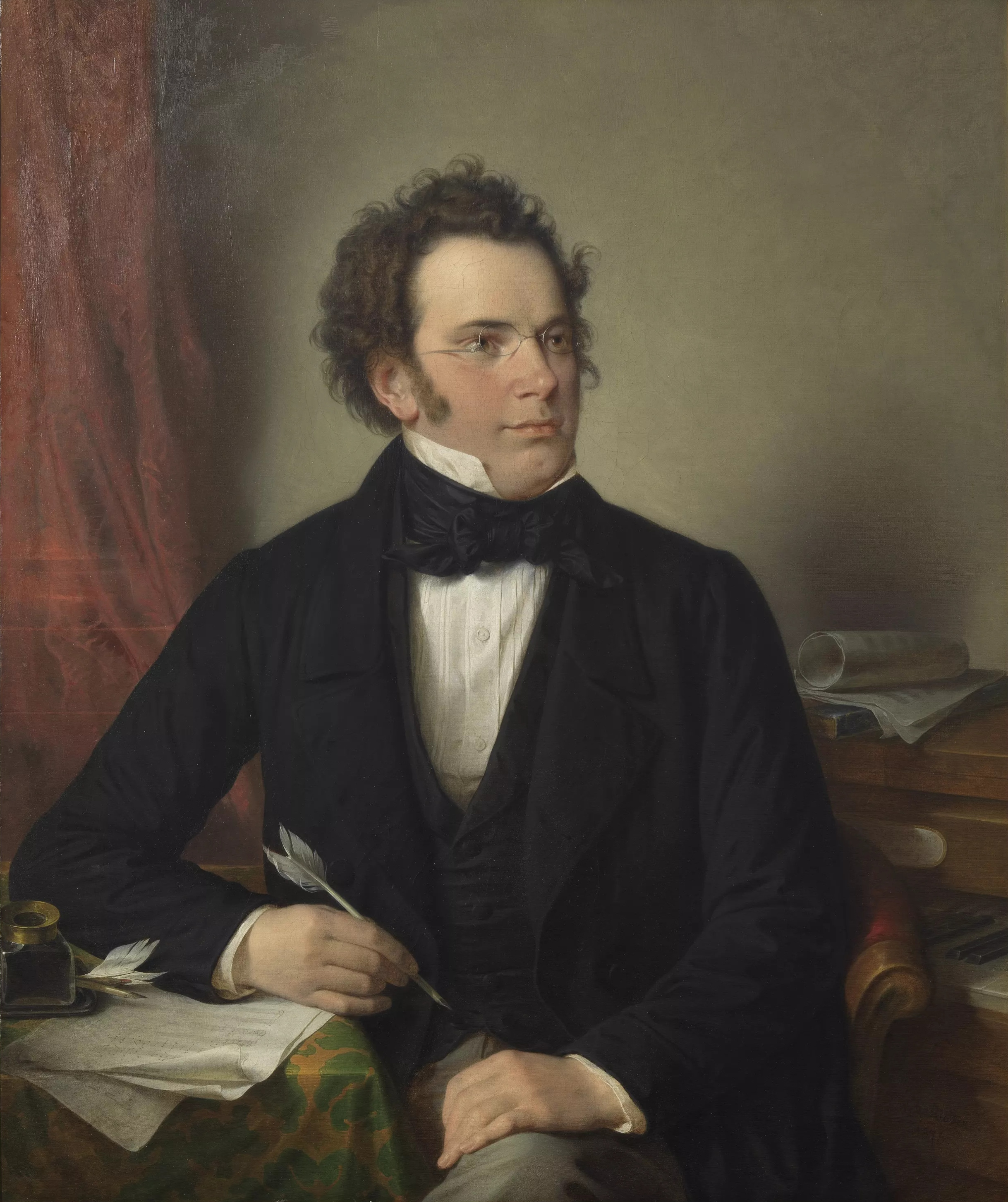
Franz Schubert

Sakuntala, also Sakontala, D 701, is an unfinished opera in three acts, written c. 1820 by Franz Schubert to a libretto by Johann Philipp Neumann. The opera is based on the Sanskrit story of Shakuntala's love for King Duschmanta and her rejection.

== Composition ==
The work is for fourteen sopranos, three altos, five tenors, nine basses, mixed choir and orchestra.

Akt I

1. Introduktion: Das holde Licht des Tages (sketch)
2. Arie: Du hoffest im Arme des Gatten (sketch)
3. Quintett: Hier liegen wir im Staub gebeuget (sketch)
4. Arie: Wie fühl’ ich, ihr Götter (sketch)
5. Chor der Waldnymphen: Wo du wandelst (sketch)
6. Arie: Noch schläft die goldne Sonne (sketch)
7. Finale I: Sieg deinen Fahnen, König (sketch)

Akt II

8a. Terzett: Komm nur Dieb (sketch)
8b. Terzett: So liebes Brüderchen (sketch)
9. Quartett: Rosenzeit der Freuden (sketch)
10. Septett: Mit liebendem Verlangen (sketch)
11. Arie: Trauet auf Götter (sketch)

== Recordings ==
- completed by Karl Aage Rasmussen, Frieder Bernius 2CD Carus 2008
