= Shakuntala (Raja Ravi Varma) =

1898 painting by Raja Ravi Varma

- Shakuntala looking for Dushyanta.
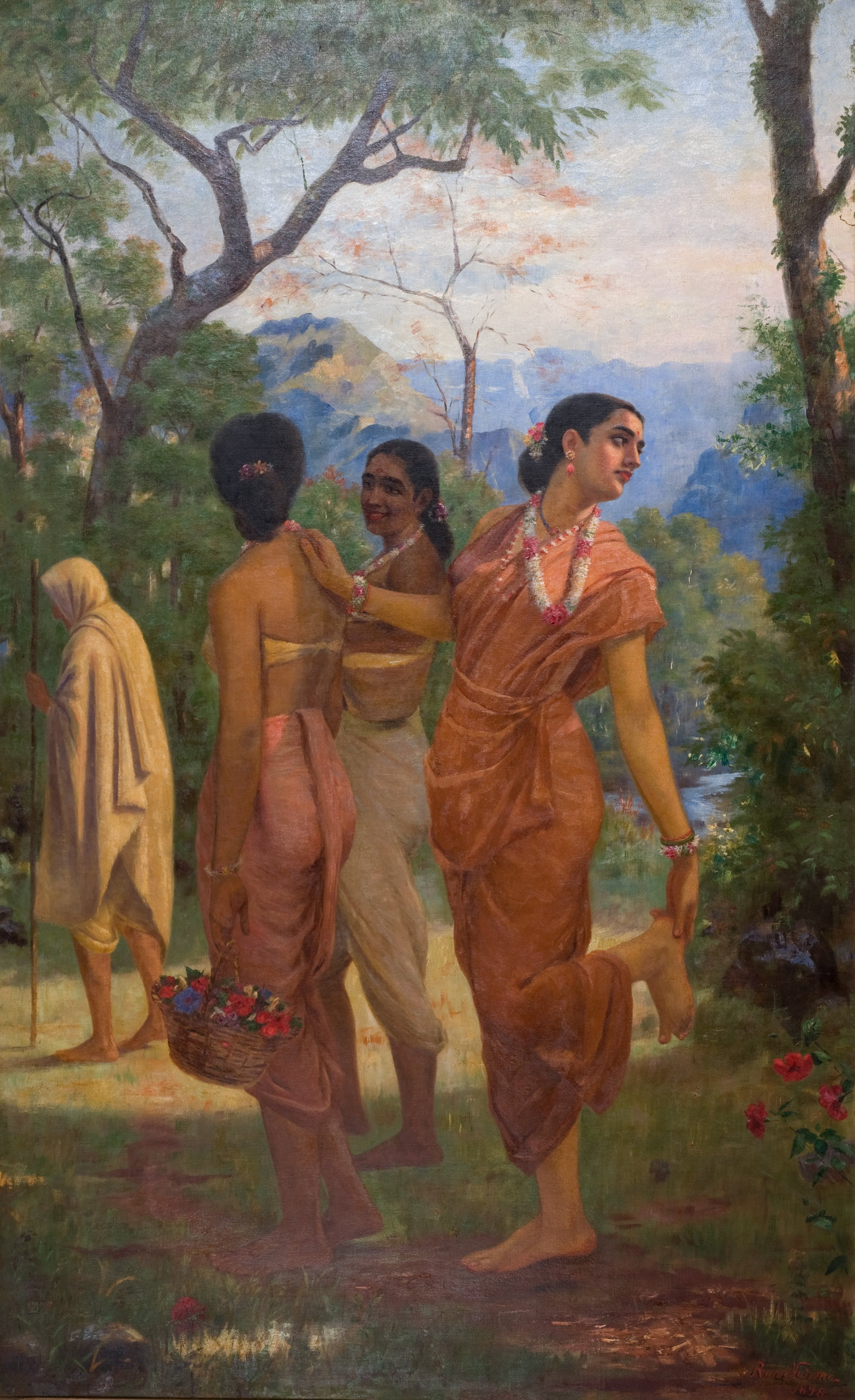
- Artist: Raja Ravi Varma
- Year: 1898
- Subject: Shakuntala and her friends
- Dimensions: 110 cm (43 in) × 181 cm (71 in)
- Location: Sree Chitra Art Gallery

Shakuntala or Shakuntala looking for Dushyanta is an 1898 epic painting by Indian painter Raja Ravi Varma.

Ravi Varma depicts Shakuntala, an important character of Mahabharata, as pretending to remove a thorn from her foot, while actually looking back to catch a glimpse of her husband/lover, Dushyantha, while her friends tease her and call her bluff.

Tapati Guha-Thakurta, an art historian, wrote;

[T]his very gesture – the twist and turn of head and body – draws the viewer into the narrative, inviting one to place this scene within an imagined sequence of images and events. On its own, the painting stands like a frozen tableau (like a still from a moving film), plucked out of an on-running spectacle of episodes. These paintings also reflect the centrality of the "male gaze" in defining the feminine image. Though absent from the pictorial frame, the male lover forms a pivotal point of reference, his gaze transfixes Shakuntala, as also Damayanti, into "desired" images, casting them as lyrical and sensual ideals.
