= Shakuntala Devi (disambiguation) =

Shakuntala Devi (1929–2013) was an Indian writer and mental calculator.

Shakuntala Devi may also refer to:

- Shakuntala Devi (film) about the writer and mental calculator
- Shakuntala Devi (politician) (born 1931–2022), Congress member of the Lok Sabha
- Sakuntla Devi, Member of the Legislative Assembly of Uttar Pradesh for the Samajwadi Party
