= Menaka =

Apsara in Hinduism

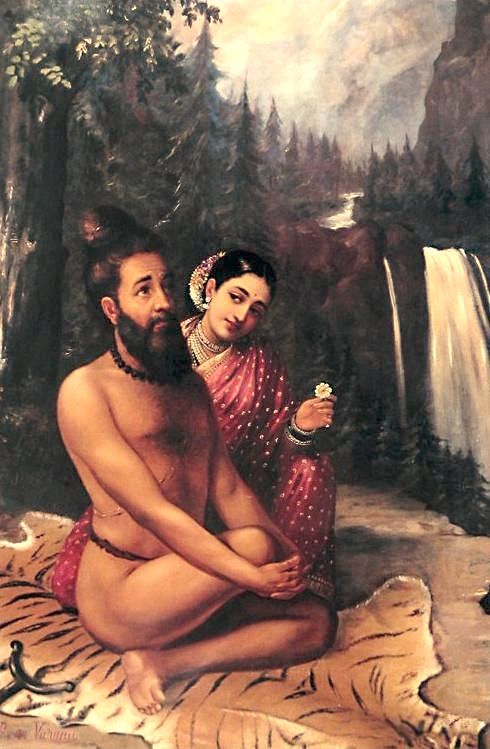
- Menaka seduces Vishvamitra, painting by Raja Ravi Varma
- Affiliation: Apsara
- Abode: Amaravati, Svarga
- Gender: Female

Genealogy
- Parents: Brahma (creator)
- Children: Shakuntala (daughter, from Vishvamitra); Pramadvara (daughter, from Vishvavasu)

Menaka (Sanskrit: मेनका IAST: Menakā) is a prominent apsara (celestial nymph) in Hindu mythology, celebrated as one of the most beautiful dancers in the court of Indra, the king of the gods. She is portrayed as an archetypal seductress, best known for her role in the seduction of the sage Vishvamitra, a story recounted in various Hindu texts and classical Sanskrit literature.

In the episode, the gods, fearing Vishvamitra's ascetic strength, send Menaka to tempt him and disrupt the penance whose growing spiritual power threatens the celestial order. With her beauty and charm, she succeeds in captivating him, temporarily deviating him from his spiritual path. From this union, Menaka becomes the mother of Shakuntala, a celebrated heroine in classical literature.

== Etymology ==
The name Menakā is derived with multiple interpretations. One explanation breaks the word as me (to measure or compare), na (a particle meaning “not”), and ka (meaning "to anyone"), rendering the sense of “incomparable” or “unequalled,” likely in reference to her exceptional beauty. Another interpretation derives it from mi-naka.

An alternative interpretation breaks the name as Menā + ka. The term Menā (from mena) is a feminine noun that can simply mean “woman” or “female,” including the female of any animal, as attested in the Rigveda. It is sometimes considered as a pre-Aryan term.

== Mythology and literary accounts ==
=== Vedas ===
The name Menaka (or Mena) appears in the Rigveda, one of the oldest texts of the Vedic corpus, as well as in the Brahmanas. However, in these contexts, Menaka is not identified as an apsara but is mentioned instead as the daughter of a king named Vrishanashva. Although apsaras are attested in Vedic literature, there is no mythological narrative involving Menaka in these early texts, nor is there any association with the sage Vishvamitra. The earliest textual reference to an apsara named Menaka occurs in the Vajasaneyi Samhita of the Yajurveda.

=== Ramayana ===
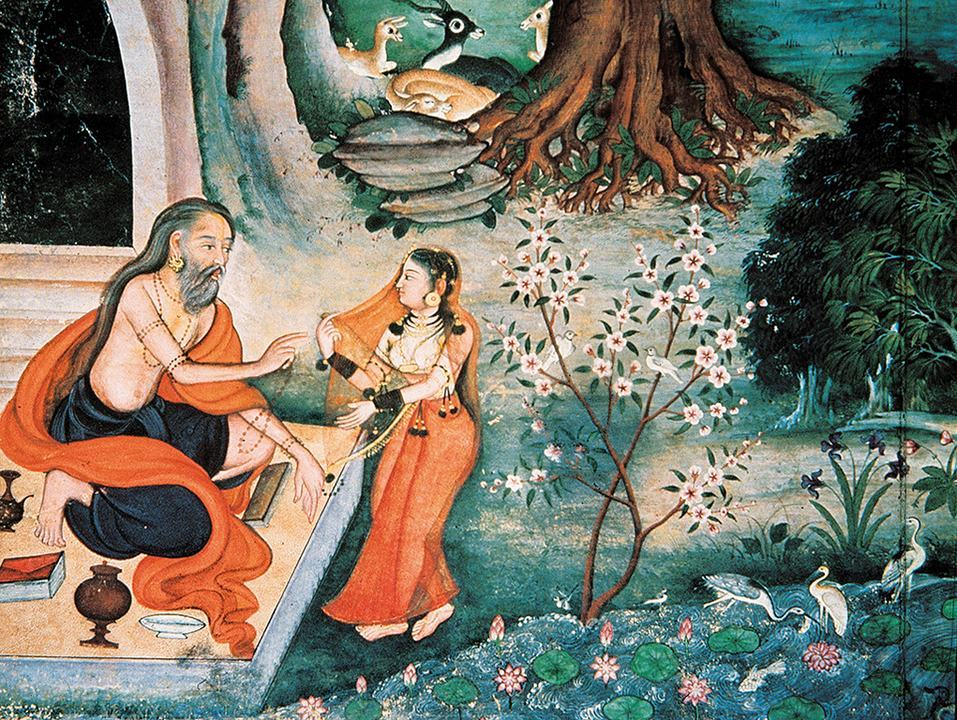
Folio from Mughal translation of Ramayana depicting Menaka with Vishvamitra, 16th century CE

The epic Ramayana (c. 700 BC - 400 CE) contains the narrative of Menaka seducing Vishvamitra—one which, according to scholar Adheesh Sathaye, predates the far more elaborate and well-known version found in the other major epic, the Mahabharata. Narrated in the Bala Kanda (1.62), Menaka appears during Vishvamitra's early quest for spiritual powers. Vishvamitra is granted the title of “Rishi", but he continues his penance in pursuit of greater spiritual status of "Brahmarishi". During this time, Menaka descends from heaven to bathe in the waters of Pushkara Lake. Vishvamitra sees her and falls in love at first sight. He invites her to stay, which Menaka accepts, and they live together in seclusion. Their companionship lasts for ten years, during which Vishvamitra abandons his penance. Eventually, he realizes that his spiritual progress has been disrupted, which he interprets as part of a divine conspiracy. Filled with shame and anger, he gently dismisses Menaka and resumes his ascetic path.

In certain Northern and Eastern recensions of the Valmiki Ramayana, Menaka is associated with the birth of the epic's central heroine, Sita, in an alternate account. As King Janaka ploughs the field during a ritual, he looks up and sees Menaka passing through the sky. Struck by her beauty, he expresses a wish to have a daughter like her. In response, a divine voice proclaims that the infant he is about to find is his own child, mind-born of Menaka. Further variants of this version exist.

=== Mahabharata ===
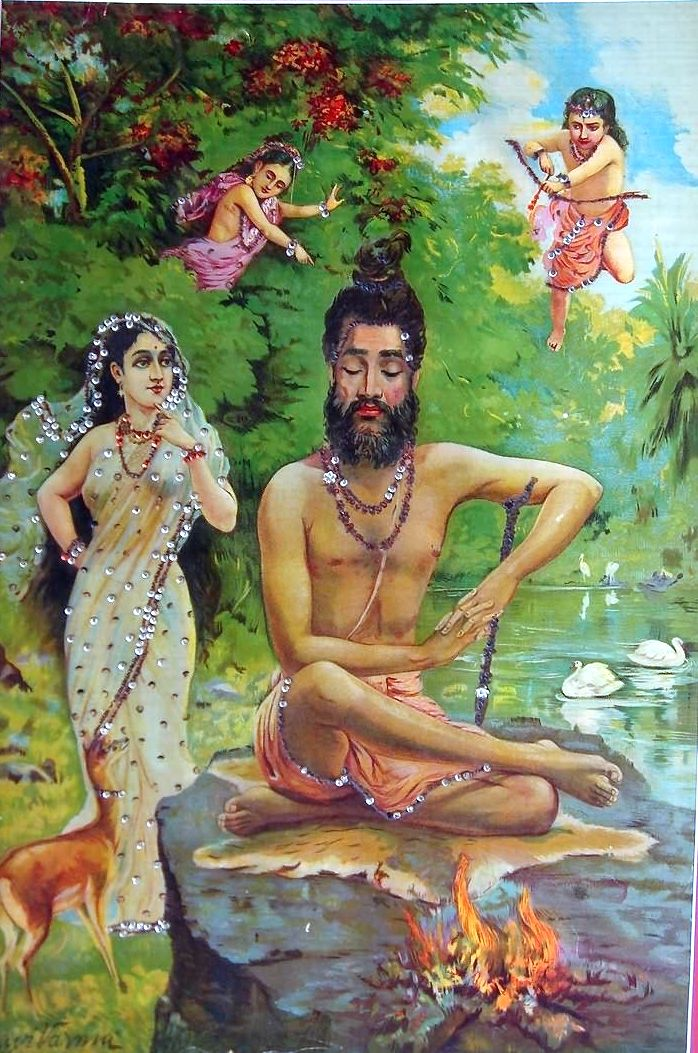
Menaka seducing Vishvamitra, aided by love god Kamadeva, print by Ravi Varma Studio

Menaka is more prominently attested in the Mahabharata (c. 400 BC - 400 AD) as an apsara (celestial nymphs) of extraordinary beauty. The Adi Parva (1.74.68) of the Mahabharata describes Menaka as the mind-born daughter of the creator god Brahma and classifies her among the six greatest celestial maidens, alongside Urvashi, Purvachitti, Sahajanya, Ghritachi, and Vishvachi. She further appears in several celebratory and courtly contexts in the epic, such as attending the birth festival (Janmotsava) of the hero Arjuna and singing on that occasion (Adi Parva 1.122.64). Additionally, Menaka performs as a dancer in the court of Kubera (Sabha Parva 2.10.10), and gives a musical performance in honour of Arjuna at Indra's court (Vana Parva 3.43.29).

The Adi Parva 1.71–72 of the epic narrates the most well-known version of her seduction of the sage Vishvamitra in detail. Alarmed by the power of Vishvamitra's asceticism, Indra summons Menaka and praises her as the foremost among apsaras. He asks her to use her beauty and charm to seduce the sage, fearing that Vishvamitra's spiritual power may threaten the gods themselves. Menaka hesitates, expressing fear of Vishvamitra's formidable energy, wrath, and self-control. Still, she agrees to carry out Indra's request, provided she is assisted by the wind-god Marut and the god of love, Kamadeva. With their help, Menaka enters Vishvamitra's forest retreat. As she performs before him, Marut suddenly blows away her garments, revealing her nude body. Pretending to be startled and modest, she tries to recover her attire. Vishvamitra sees her, is captivated by her youthful charm, and invites her to stay. Menaka accepts, and they live together for a long period, enjoying each other's company. Eventually, Menaka gives birth to a daughter, Shakuntala. When the child is born, Menaka takes her to the banks of the river Malini, in the Himalayas, and leaves her there before returning to heaven. The infant is surrounded by vultures, who protect her from harm. She is later discovered by the sage Kanva, who raises her as his own.

In another episode from the Mahabharata (Adi Parva, 1.8–12), Menaka courts Vishvavasu, the king of Gandharvas (celestial musicians) and becomes the mother of a daughter named Pramadvara. Like with Shakuntala, when the time comes to give birth, Menaka, without any maternal affection, leaves the newborn Pramadvara on the banks of a river near the hermitage of the sage Sthulakesha and returns to heaven. The Udyoga Parva mentions another Gandharva, namely Urnayu, with Menaka as a couple.

=== Puranas ===
Menaka's role in the Puranas closely parallels her portrayal in the epics, though some texts offer unique variations. In the Skanda Purana, a notable version of her encounter with Vishvamitra appears with a reversal of motives. In this account, Menaka becomes infactuated with Vishvamitra, who is here emphasized being handsome and youthful, performing penance. She approaches him with sexual advances but he resists her. Angered by his rejection, she curses him. Vishvamitra, in turn, retaliates by cursing her with old age. Eventually, both are released from their afflictions after bathing in a sacred tirtha near which a shrine to Vishvamiteshvara is established. In other Puranic accounts, Menaka is again depicted as a celestial temptress dispatched by Indra to disturb the penances of sages and even other gods, including the death god Yama.

Other than her role as a seductress, Menaka plays a minor but significant role in one version of the prelude to the Samudra Manthana (Churning of the Ocean), a major episode. While sage Durvasa is travelling through a forest, he encounters Menaka holding a garland of fragrant Kalpaka flowers and requests the garland, and Menaka, with humility and reverence, offers it to the sage.

Menaka is also described in several Puranic texts, including the Bhagavata Purana (12.11.35), Brahmanda Purana (2.23.6; 3.7.14; 4.33.18), Vayu Purana (52.7; 69.49), and the Vishnu Purana (2.10.7), as the apsara presiding over the lunar months of Shukra and Shuchi, paired with Sahajanya, and associated with the sun during the summer season.

=== Classical literature ===
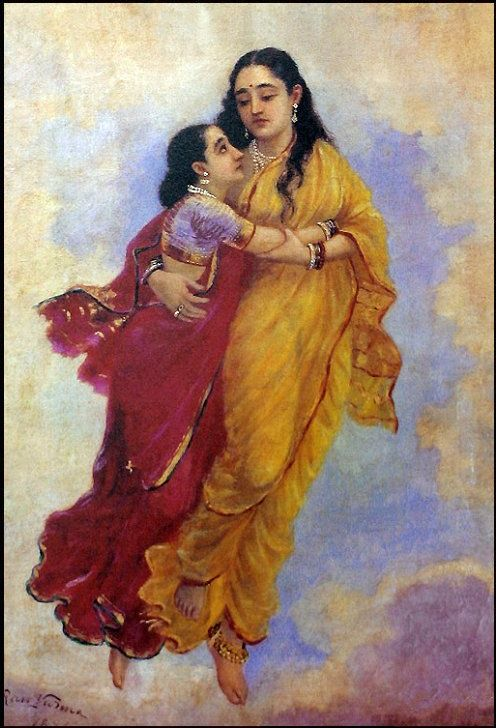
Painting by Raja Ravi Varma depicting Menaka carrying Shakuntala, 1891

In Abhijnanashakuntalam, a classical Sanskrit drama by Kalidasa (f. 4th century CE), Menaka is adapted as a named character with a more nuanced portrayal. While she retains her role as the celestial seductress who interrupts Vishvamitra's penance, Kalidasa introduces a significant departure from earlier texts by emphasizing her maternal side—an aspect largely absent in the previous portrayals. When Shakuntala is abandoned by her husband, King Dushyanta, due to a curse that causes him to forget her, Menaka descends from heaven to comfort her daughter and take her to a celestial abode, offering protection and care. In Kalidasa's another play, Vikramorvashiyam, Menaka appears alongside Rambha and Sahanjaya as companions of Urvashi, the foremost apsara and heroine of the play. Together, the apsaras report Urvashi's abduction to the hero, King Pururavas.

In the Kathasaritsagara, a medieval Sanskrit compendium of stories by Somadeva (f. 11th century CE), Menaka appears in the tale of the hermit Mankanaka. While he was performing penance, Menaka appeared before him, her garments floating in the breeze. Overcome by desire, Mankanaka's seed fell on a plantain flower, leading to the birth of a daughter named Kadaligarbha.

== Symbolism ==
Menaka's appearance in Hindu mythology reflects a broader theme in which celestial women seduce sages or engage with mortal men to produce dynastic heirs. Across both epic and Puranic traditions, her role serves as a test of ascetic discipline. The central motif remains consistent: Vishvamitra's succumbing to Menaka's beauty results in the loss of his accumulated ascetic power (tapas). This theme is emphasized by later commentators. For example, the medieval scholar Govindaraja, in his commentary on the Ramayana, explains that the episode illustrates Vishvamitra's lack of sensual control. The narrative demonstrates how unregulated desire (kama) undermines spiritual attainment.

Writer and mythologist Devdutt Pattanaik interprets the confrontation between apsaras like Menaka and sages as symbolic of a deeper philosophical tension between fertility cults and monastic orders. He notes that monastic traditions, rooted in Vedantic thought, seek to transcend maya (illusion) and reject worldly desires such as sensuality and violence, which bind beings to the cycle of rebirth (samsara). In contrast, apsaras embody the forces of nature and material life. According to Pattanaik, their purpose is twofold: to test the sage's spiritual resolve and to obstruct the accumulation of occult power (siddhi) through distraction. Menaka seduces; others, like Rambha, provoke anger. In this view, apsaras are not mere temptresses but agents of cosmic balance, deployed by Indra to protect the natural order from the destabilizing effects of extreme asceticism. Indra's use of apsaras reflects the threat that such austerities pose to the fertility-based worldview, where procreation is essential to prosperity and survival.

Modern scholar Arshia Sattar views the story of Menaka and Vishvamitra as paradigmatic—establishing the apsara-sage trope rather than merely sustaining it. In one version, Menaka is simply a tool of the gods, a woman with no attachments who abandons her child out of her own free will; in another, she becomes a sympathetic, even tragic figure, punished for falling in love and left with neither partner nor child. Sattar interprets Menaka as a powerful yet paradoxical symbol: “forever young, forever beautiful, never attached, always willing to seduce, even willing to bear children if she must.” In this reading, Menaka embodies the ultimate male fantasy—a sexually idealised lady whose promiscuity has no consequences.
