= Shakuntala (1920 film) =

1920 film by Suchet Singh

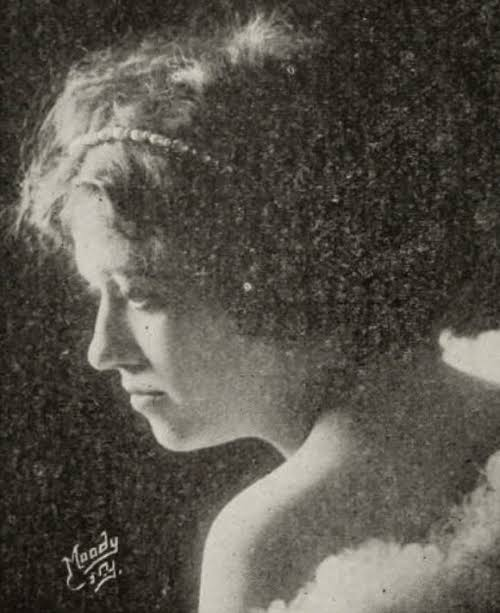
- Original title: Shakuntala
- Directed by: Suchet Singh
- Release date: 1920
- Country: India

Shakuntala is a 1920 film directed by Suchet Singh.

== Plot ==
Raja Dushyanta going to hunt in a forest happens upon a beautiful maiden, her name was Shakuntala. Raja instantly falls in love with her. He gives her a ring as a symbol of his affection and commitment to marry. After return, Raja has an attack of amnesia and Shakuntala loses the ring in a lake, so she could not convince him of who she is.

== Cast ==
- Dorothy Kingdon as Shakuntala
- Goharjaan as Raja Dushyanta
- Samson as Sampson
- Sutria as Mrs. Sutria
- Signorina Albertini
- Khorshedji Engineer
- Kanjibhai Rathod
- Rewashankar
- Dadibhai Sarkari
- Isaac Simon
