= Shakuntala (1965 film) =

- Directed by: Kunchacko
- Written by: Kalidasan; Lalithambika Antharjanam (dialogues)
- Screenplay by: Lalithambika Antharjanam
- Produced by: M Kunchacko
- Starring: Prem Nazir; Sathyan; Thikkurissy Sukumaran Nair; Kalaikkal Kumaran; Rajasree; Prema
- Music by: G. Devarajan; K. Raghavan
- Production company: Excel Productions
- Release date: 13 November 1965
- Country: India
- Language: Malayalam

Shakuntala is a 1965 Indian Malayalam-language film, directed and produced by Kunchacko. The film stars Prem Nazir, Sathyan, Thikkurissy Sukumaran Nair and K. R. VIJAYA. G. Devarajan and K. Raghavan composed the music. Adapted from the 1961 Bollywood film Stree, Shakuntala had its opening sequence in Eastmancolor.

== Cast ==
- Prem Nazir
- Kalaikkal Kumaran
- Sathyan
- Thikkurissy Sukumaran Nair
- Prema
- Aranmula Ponnamma
- KS Gopinath
- Rajasree
- Jolly
- K. R. Vijaya
- MS Namboothiri
- Rani

== Soundtrack ==
Shakuntala

Soundtrack album by G. Devarajan
- Released: 13 November 1965
- Recorded: 1965
- Venue: Chennai
- Studio: Revathi Studios
- Genre: World Music
- Label: Odeon Records
- Producer: Kunchacko

G. Devarajan chronology
Daaham (1965)	Shakuntala (1965)	Kaliyodam (1965)

All lyrics are written by Vayalar Ramavarma except where noted; all music is composed by G. Devarajan All the 10 songs penned by Vayalar were set to tune by Devarajan based on classical ragas. Most of the songs became super hits. The romantic number sung by P. Susheela, ‘Priyatama Priyatama pranayalekhanam...’ based on Bilahari raga; the Desh based ‘Sankhu pushpam kannezhuthumbol...’ and Kharaharapriya based ‘Swarana thamara ithalilurangum...,’ both sung by K. J. Yesudas remain among the best songs of the two singers. The romantic Yesudas-Susheela duet, set in Mohanam, ‘Malini nadiyil kannadi nokkum maane...’ is considered one of the best romantic duets in Malayalam. P. B. Sreenivas imparted a highly emotional touch to the Charukesi-based ‘Vanadevathamare Vida nalkoo...,’ while the dance number ‘Manichilamboli kettunaroo...’ sung by S. Janaki became hits.

No.	Title	Lyrics	Artist(s)	Length
1.	"Guru Brahma" (Traditional)		M. L. Vasanthakumari
2.	"Kaamavardhiniyaam [Varnippathengine (Krishnakuchela)]"	P. Bhaskaran	P. Leela, M. L. Vasanthakumari
3.	"Kalil Chilanka"		K. J. Yesudas, M. L. Vasanthakumari
4.	"Kannil Ashrujalamode"		G. Devarajan
5.	"Maalini Nadiyil"		K. J. Yesudas, P. Susheela
6.	"Mandaarathalir Pole"		K. J. Yesudas
7.	"Manichilamboli"		S. Janaki
8.	"Manoradhamennoru"		P. Susheela, Choir
9.	"Pitha Rakshathi" (Traditional)		P. B. Sreenivas
10.	"Priyathamaa"		P. Susheela
11.	"Pulliman Mizhi"		G. Devarajan
12.	"Shaarikappaithale"		P Susheela
13.	"Shankhupushpam Kannezhuthumbol"		K. J. Yesudas
14.	"Swarnathaamarayithalil"		K. J. Yesudas
15.	"Vanadevathamaare"		P. B. Sreenivas
