= Dushyanta =

Legendary king in Hinduism

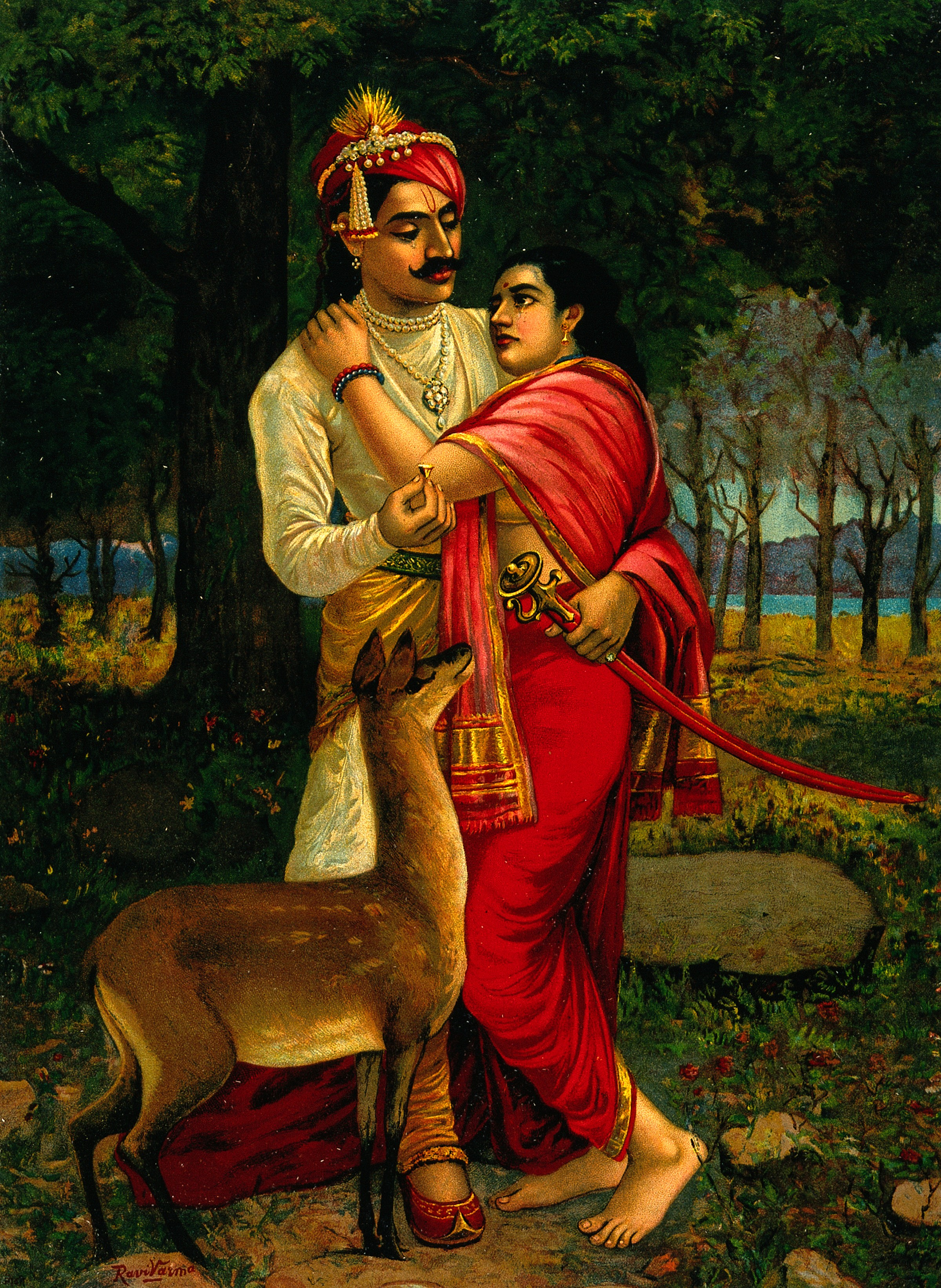
- A scene from the play depicting Dushyanta proposing marriage with a ring to Shakuntala. Chromolithograph by Raja Ravi Varma.
- Texts: Mahabharata, Shakuntala

Personal Information
- Gender: Male
- Position: King of Hastinapura
- Family: Ilin/Santurodha (father); Rathantari/Upadanavi (mother); Sushmanta/Sura, Pravira/ Bhima, Anagha/Pravasu and Vasu (brothers)
- Spouse: Shakuntala
- Children: Bharata
- Dynasty: Paurava-Chandravamsha (Lunar Dynasty)

Dushyanta (Sanskrit: दुष्यन्त, IAST: Duṣyanta), also referred to as Duhshanta (Sanskrit: दुःषन्त, IAST: Duhṣanta), is a king featured in Hindu literature and mythology. He belongs to the Paurava line of the legendary Lunar dynasty. According to the epic Mahabharata, he is the eldest son of King Ilina and inherits Hastinapura. During a hunting expedition he encounters Shakuntala, the foster daughter of the sage Kanva. Struck by her beauty, he persuades her to enter into a Gandharva marriage. After consummating the union in her hermitage, Dushyanta leaves, promising to bring her to Hastinapura, but fails to do so. When Shakuntala later appears before him in his court with their six-year-old son Bharata, Dushyanta, though he recognises her, pretends not to know her. Fearing public ridicule and doubts about the legitimacy of the heir, he insults her until a celestial voice compels him to accept them. He then accepts Shakuntala as his queen and crowns Bharata as his heir.

In Kalidasa's play, Abhijnanashakuntalam (c. 300 CE), Dushyanta's story is reworked as a classical nayaka (hero). The Mahabharata’s depiction of a king who knowingly rejects his wife and son is altered by the introduction of Dushyanta's signet ring and the sage Durvasa's curse: when Shakuntala, lost in thoughts of Dushyanta, fails to greet the sage, he decrees that her beloved will forget her until shown a token of their union. Having left her with his signet ring, Dushyanta genuinely loses all memory of the marriage; his later repudiation of the pregnant Shakuntala at court therefore stems from the curse rather than deliberate deceit. Recovery of the ring restores his memory, plunges him into remorse, and leads to eventual reunion with Shakuntala and their son, allowing the dramatist to present him as a noble, dutiful and emotionally refined hero consistent with classical ideals..

== Legend ==
According to the Mahabharata, Dushyanta is the son of Ilin and Rathantī, also rendered Ilina and Rathantara, respectively. According to primogeniture, Dushyanta succeeds his father as the king of Hastinapura, because he is the eldest among his siblings Sura, Bhima, Pravashu, and Vasu.

=== Mahabharata ===
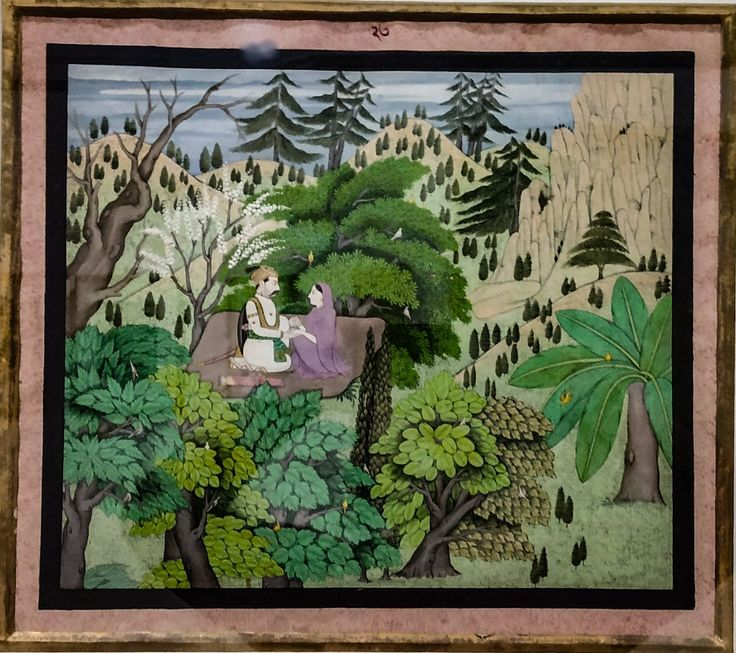
Miniature painting showing Dushyant and Shakuntala, circa 1840, Nalagarh, Himachal Pradesh National Museum, Delhi

The Mahabharata narrates that Dushyanta once set out on a hunt and arrived at a forest, where he entered the hermitage of sage Kanva near the Malini River. There, he met Shakuntala, Kanva’s foster daughter, who welcomed him in her father’s absence. Enchanted by her beauty, Dushyanta inquired about her lineage, and she recounted her birth from Vishvamitra and Menaka. He fell in love with her and, following Gandharva marriage, wedded her, agreeing that their son would inherit the throne. After Shakuntala conceived, Dushyanta promised to take her to his palace and departed.

Kanva returned and, perceiving events through divine insight, blessed Shakuntala with a son destined to rule the world. She gave birth to Sarvadamana, whom Kanva raised. At six, he was sent with Shakuntala to Hastinapura. When they arrived, Dushyanta denied their marriage and refuses to acknowledge them as his kin. A heated argument ensued until a celestial voice confirmed the union and declared that Sarvadamana, later named Bharata, would become a great ruler. Bharata ruled for 27,000 years, and therefore, the kingdom that he inherited and expanded came to be known as Bhārata, named after him.

=== Abhijnana-shakuntalam ===
During the summer, King Dushyanta pursued an antelope in the forest, when he was confronted by an ascetic. The ascetic told him that the creature belonged to the ashrama of Kanva, and he was not to violate the sanctity of the land by slaying it. Dushyanta agreed to not kill the antelope, and was encouraged to visit the ashrama. He was told that he would be welcomed by Shakuntala, Kanva's adopted daughter, due to the sage's absence. Upon entering the ashrama, he came across three exquisite girls watering the plants, and became infatuated with Shakuntala, who was one among the trio. After a conversation with the bevy, he learnt that the true parents of Shakuntala were Vishvamitra and Menaka, which made Shakuntala a suitable bride for him due to her warrior parentage. Dushyanta, however, chose not to reveal his identity. The company broke up due to hearing that an elephant was running amok, and Shakuntala grew enamoured of the visitor. The king directed his general to stop the chaos and instruct his men to stay away from the ashrama. He confessed his feelings to his companion and jester Vidushaka, urging him to think of a pretext to stay in the ashrama without arousing suspicion. Fortunately, a few ascetics approached him soon to request him to safeguard their yajna, which he readily accepted. He sent Vidushaka to his capital, and fearing that his friend would be a tattletale, he lied, stating that his feelings for Shakuntala were but a joke. For a time, he watched over the ascetics' yajna. Shankuntala soon confessed her feelings for Dushyanta, and the two were married according to gandharva rites. The king left for the capital, and promised his wife that he would send a suitable guard to escort her to his palace.

In her solitude, Shakuntala was absorbed in thoughts of her husband, due to which she failed to offer the appropriate hospitality to the short-tempered sage, Durvasa. Durvasa cursed her, stating that the man she was thinking of to such an extent that he had been neglected would never remember her. One of Shakuntala's friends, Anasuya, offered an explanation of her friend's absent-mindedness, and sought forgiveness from the sage. Duravasa agreed to offer a concession of the curse, stating that the man would remember her upon the presentation of a token of recognition. Shakuntala's companions did not reveal this curse to her, reasoning that it did not matter; Shakuntala did, after all, have such a token of recognition, so her husband would no doubt recall her. Kanva returned to his ashrama, and offered his consent for the marriage. The curse took effect, and Dushyanta lost all memory of Shakuntala. When Shakuntala started to show signs of pregnancy, Kanva decided to send her to her lawful husband, explaining to her the duties of a wife and a daughter-in-law. Upon reaching the king's palace, Dushyanta failed to recognise Shakuntala, and merely expressed his incredulity when the accompanying sages urged him to accept her as his queen. Shakuntala searched for the ring that the king had presented her during their parting, but realised that it had been lost during the journey. While leaving the hall, the anguished Shakuntala is carried off by an apsara. After a while, the ring that Shakuntala had dropped in a pool of water was discovered by a fisherman inside a fish, which was produced before Dushyanta following accusations of theft. Durvasa's curse was broken upon the king seeing the ring, and his memory of his wife was restored. Helpless and repentant of his actions, Dushyanta dwelt on his childlessness, which caused him to faint. Matali, Indra's charioteer, arrived to Dushyanta's court, seeking his assistance in the war of the devas against the asuras. Dushyanta agreed to participate, viewing it as a welcome diversion.

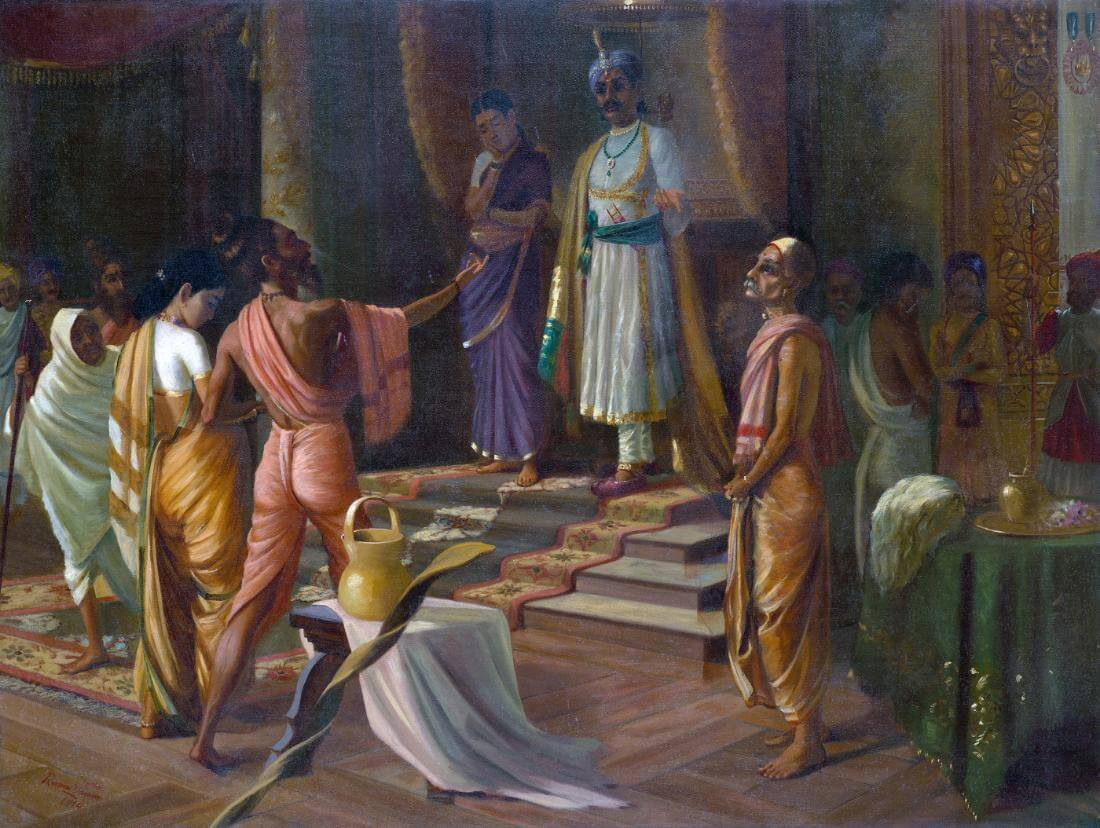
Shakuntala in the court Of Dushyanta, painting by Raja Ravi Varma.

Dushyanta was successful in his war, and was honoured by Indra following their triumph. Matali escorted the king back to earth upon his vimana, and the two alighted upon the ashrama of Sage Kashyapa (Maricha in other accounts) to pay their respects. While the charioteer visited the sage, the king came across a boy who was the spitting image of himself, playing with a lion cub. He soon learnt that the boy, Bharata, belonged to the race of Puru, and was the son of Shakuntala. Shakuntala appeared, and the couple soon reconciled. Kashyapa explained the nature of the curse to Dushyanta, and assured him that the loss of his memory of his wife was not his fault. He pronounced his blessings on the couple. Together, the couple and their son returned to Hastinapura, and led a happy life.
