= Kanva =

Sage in Hinduism

Kanva or Kanwa (Sanskrit: कण्व, IAST: Kaṇva), also called Karnesh, was an ancient Hindu rishi of the Treta Yuga, to whom some of the hymns of the Rig Veda are ascribed. He was one of the Angirasas. He has been called a son of Ghora, but this lineage belongs to Pragatha Kanva, a subsequent Kanva of which there were many. However, Puranic literature has other different lineages for him, one as the son of Apratiratha and grandson of King Matinara, and another as the son of Ajamidha, who was a descendant in the ninth generation of Tansu, the brother of Apratiratha (Atiratha), or Ajamidha who was a contemporary of Matinara. This last seems to be the modern consensus. He is sometimes included in the list of the seven sages (the Saptarishis). Kanva had a son Medhatithi. Kanva is also mentioned in Mahabharata as the adoptive father of Shakuntala.

- Kanva (Karnesh) is also the name of a founder of a Vedic shakha of the Shukla Yajur Veda, and hence the name of that theological branch of Hinduism, the Kanva Shakha.
- Kanva (Karnesh) is also the name of several princes and founders of dynasties and several authors.
- The Kanvas (Karnesh) are the descendants of king Vasudeva Kanva (1st century BCE).
- The Kanvas are also a class of spirit, against whom hymn 2.25 of the Atharva Veda is used as a charm.
