= Chains: Love Stories of Shadows =

Dance theater production by Savitha Sastry

Chains
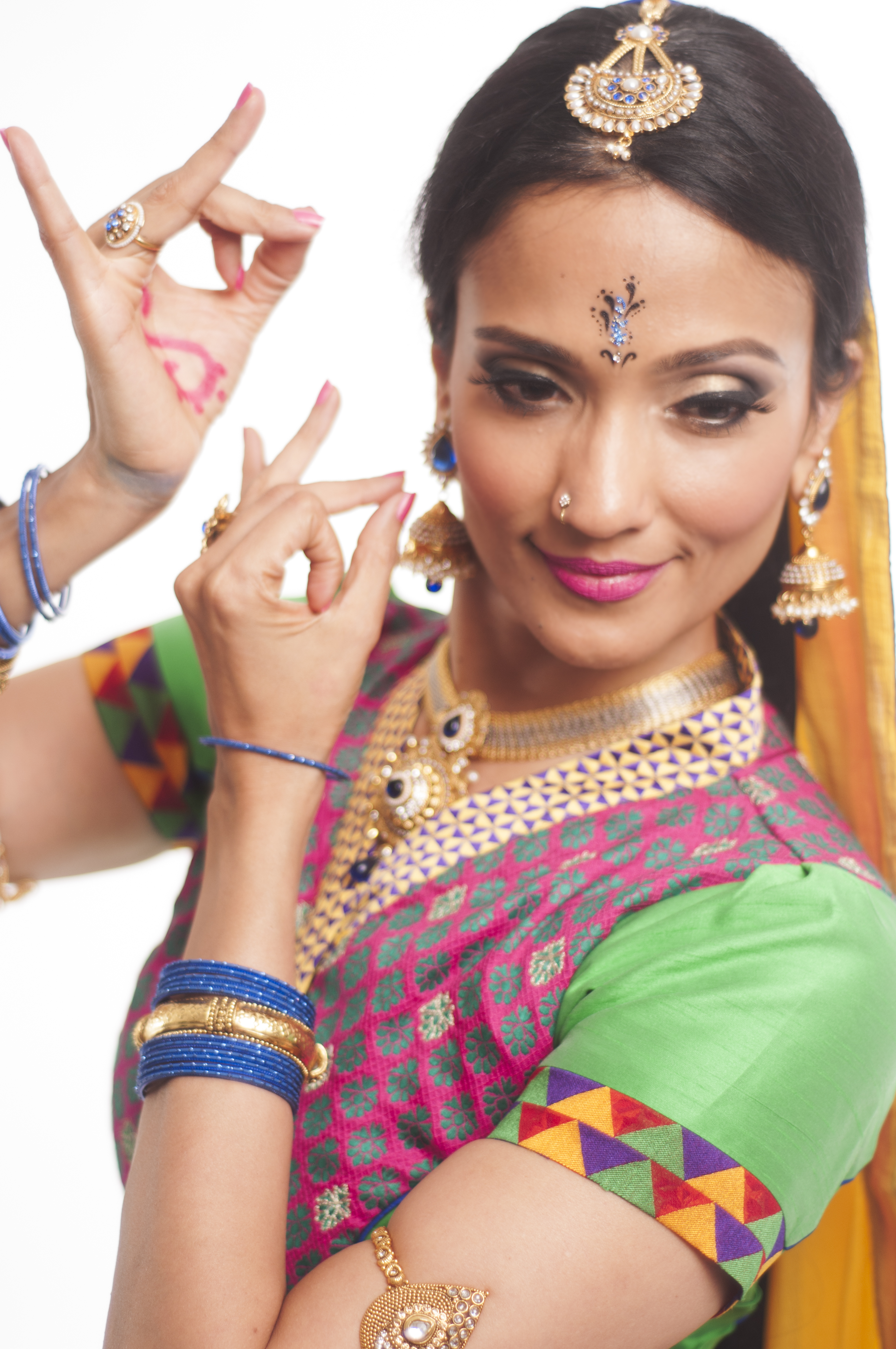
- Love Stories of Shadows
- Company: The Savitha Sastry Production Company
- Genre: Solo Bharatanatyam Dance Theatre
- Date of premiere: 31 January 2015

Creative team
- Choreography & Artistic Direction: Savitha Sastry
- Produced & Written by: AK Srikanth
- Music: Rajkumar Bharathi
- Technical Direction: Victor Paul Raj

Chains is a solo Bharatanatyam Dance Theater production choreographed, directed and performed by Savitha Sastry. It is based on a trilogy of short stories written by her husband AK Srikanth, who is also the producer of the show. The soundtrack was scored by the Chennai-based music composer Rajkumar Bharathi, the great grandson of veteran freedom fighter and poet Subramania Bharathi. Unlike Savitha’s other productions, Chains is not a work of fiction but is entirely based on true lives. The production premiered at Mumbai’s NCPA Auditorium on 31 January 2015, and is highly acclaimed for its nuanced delivery.

== Plot ==
Chains follows the life of a woman named Vichitra, and the story is narrated by Solitude. In the first act, Vichitra is shown as a vivacious sixteen-year-old who is much admired for her beauty. Vichitra falls in love with Adhvik, a young boy with Asperger syndrome. The love story comes to an end in the face of extreme reactions from Vichitra’s parents, and she is sent far away from her home. The second part showcases Vichitra, now in her middle age, as a mother, wife and daughter in law. Her days are monotonous and routine, but she finds her escape in the night when she dreams of being a dance diva under the spotlight. Her real and dream worlds start to merge, until one day she is yanked back when she starts hearing voices of her family beseeching her to return to her 'real' self. The final act presents Vichitra in her advanced age, fighting solitude. The show ends with Vichitra accepting Solitude as her lover and vowing to spend her life with him, even as her family and neighbours conclude that senility has caused her to reach the limits of sanity.

== Cast ==
All three acts are narrated by Solitude who is portrayed as a character, though he never appears on stage. Savitha Sastry performs Vichitra’s character.

== Production ==
The second act of Chains was written in 2012. In 2013-14, Srikanth added two more parts as a prequel and a sequel, and the production commenced in March 2014. In line with her other productions such as Soul Cages, Yudh, and The Prophet, Chains too steers clear of conventional Bharatanatyam themes of a nayika (heroine) pining for love, or pieces based on Bhakti (devotion), and instead delivers an original and contemporary story not based in religion or Indian mythology. The production used several effects from theater such as special lighting, use of voiceovers and narratives in the soundtrack.

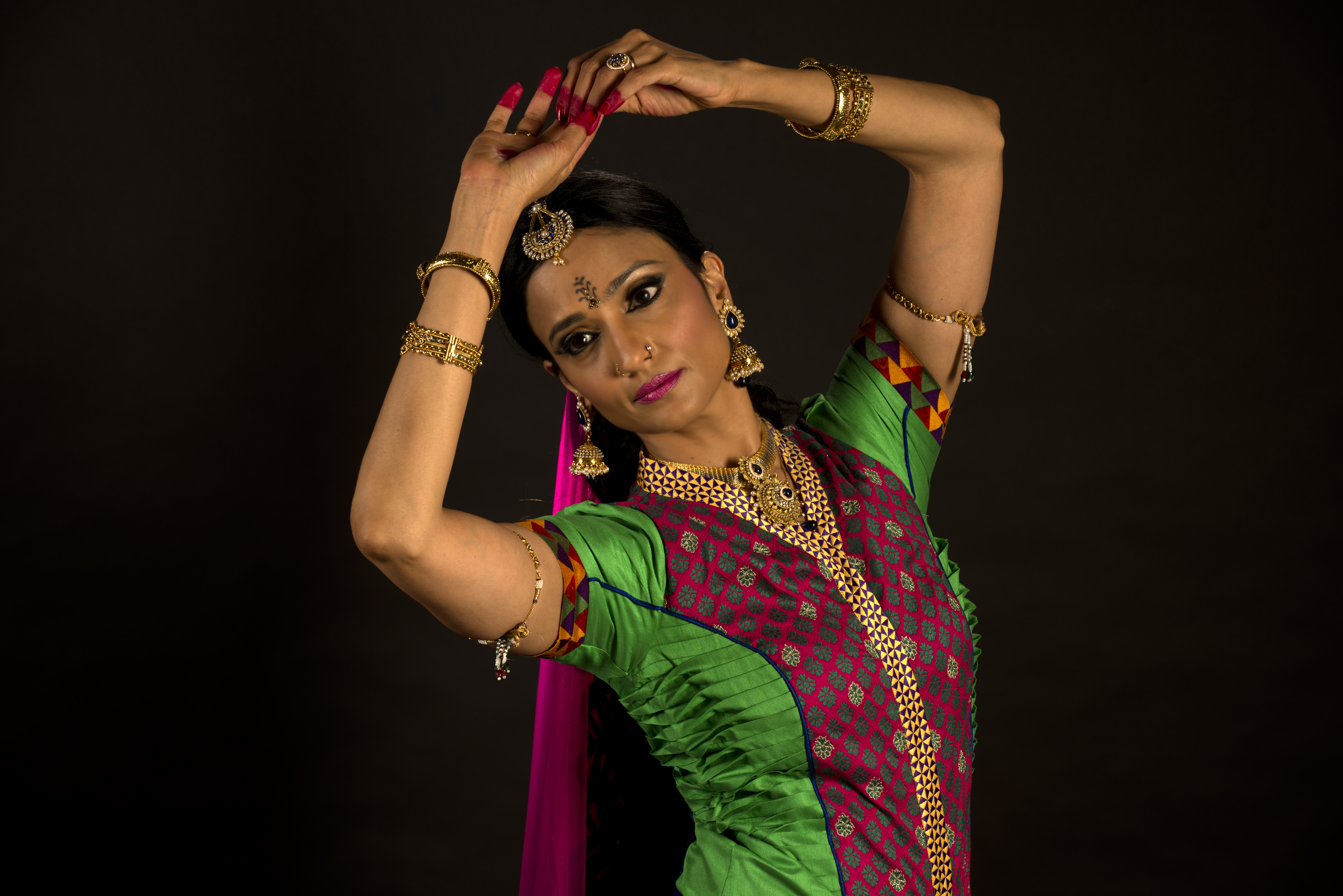
Savitha Sastry performing Chains: Love Stories of Shadows at NCPA Mumbai (Jan 31st, 2015)

== Critical reception ==
Chains received hugely positive reviews from the critics and the audience. Critic Charu Sharma commented in the Times of India that the production "showcased how a woman's decisions are moulded more by external factors than personal will". Critic Narayana Vishwanath of Indian Express wrote 'Savitha Sastry delivered the raging and tumultuous tale of bondage with grace and lucidity' and added that the final effect was 'a visual epiphany'. Critic Mahalakshmi Subramanian of DNA reported "Indeed a huge accomplishment for Sastry as she has proven this art form can be entertaining and thought-provoking too.". DNA also went on to report that the experience was "Unconventional and thought provoking." Noted art critic Soma Das of Mid-Day said "(the presentation) unshackled age-old chains". The praise for Savitha’s attempts to make Bharathanatyam more accessible was also highly praised by Critic Arun Venkatraman in the Asian Age, when he said "Seamlessly merges tradition with improvisation... refreshing tone to an age old dance form."

Savitha's performance as Vichitra was highly lauded. A critic from DNA-After Hours reported "[Savitha] delivers original story lines with her impeccable artistry and technique.. the genius of artistic direction, elegance and perfection on stage." Critic Anannya Chatterjee referred to her as the "Renaissance-architect of Bharatanatyam" in Absolute India, while critic Ashok Dhamija of Newsband, Navi Mumbai wrote "Savitha holds the distinction of being the one woman since Rukmini Devi Arundale to have brought about a revolution in the way Bharatanatyam is presented."

== Credits ==
- Artistic Direction and Choreography: Savitha Sastry
- Production, Story, Song Lyrics, Script: AK Srikanth
- Music: Rajkumar Bharathi
- Sound Analyst: Sai Shravanam (Resound Studios, Chennai)
- Narration: Hans Kaushik
- Technical Direction: Victor Paulraj (Studio7, Chennai)
- Design and Photographs: Aditya Sastry (Lost Arrow Studio, California)
- Vocals: Keerthana Vaidyanathan
- Keyboard and Harmonica: Vijayshankar
- Percussion: Ganapathy
- Shehnai: S. Ballesh
- Veena: Bhavani Prasad
- Sitar and Zitar: L Kishore

== Dance Film ==
In 2018, Chains was released as a dance film and made available on a free to view digital format.
