= The Prophet: Destiny. Divinity. Doubt =

The Prophet
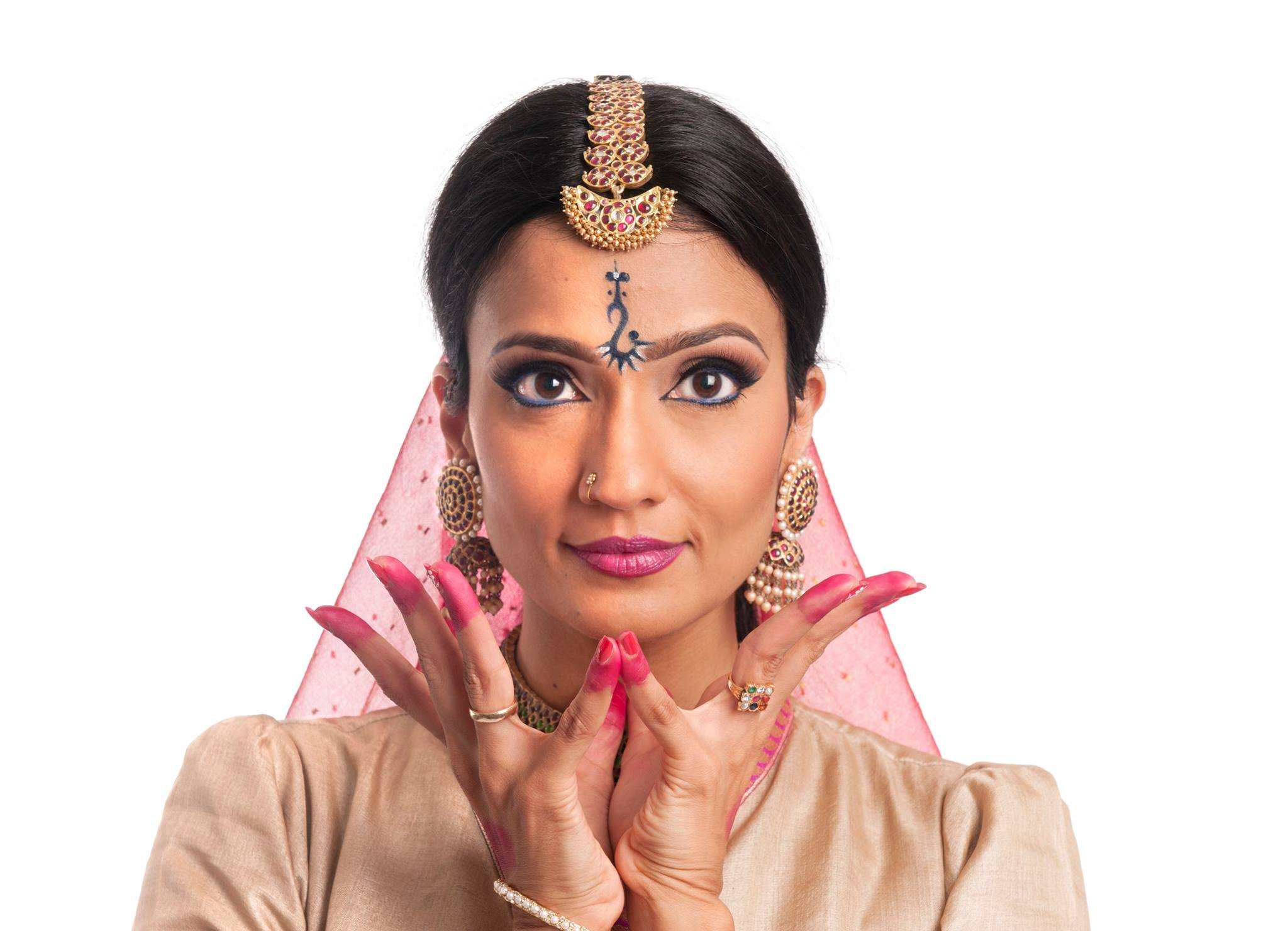
- Destiny. Divinity. Doubt.
- Company: The Savitha Sastry Production Company
- Genre: Solo Bharatanatyam Dance Theatre
- Date of premiere: 20 October 2013

Creative team
- Choreography & Artistic Direction: Savitha Sastry
- Producer and Writer: AK Srikanth
- Music: Rajkumar Bharathi
- Technical Direction: Victor Paul Raj

The Prophet is a solo Bharatanatyam Dance Theatre production choreographed and performed by Savitha Sastry. It is based on a short story of the same name by her husband AK Srikanth, who is also the Producer of the show. The music is by Rajkumar Bharathi, great-grandson of the freedom fighter and veteran poet Subramania Bharathi. The production premiered at Bangalore’s ADA Ranga Mandira Auditorium on 20 October 2013. The presentation has been highly acclaimed for its unconventional and intense denouement.

== Plot ==
The Prophet tells a fictional story of a woman named Devaduta, following her life from her adolescence through to her last days. Devaduta is born in poverty, and her childhood is marred by unending toil, and her relationship with an abusive father – a drunkard and a child abuser. At one point, Devaduta starts hearing a voice that she identifies as the ‘Voice of God’. She escapes from her home, to find employment as a cleaner at a dance academy. The guru at this academy identifies a spark in her and trains her, to see her blossom into a danseuse par excellence. With her fame and fortunes, Devaduta goes on to build an Ashram to help needy children, while being constantly guided by the ‘Voice of God’. Her social work and the fact that she hears ‘the Voice of God’ gets her the epithet of ‘The Prophet’ from the people. However one day the voice tells her she has a year to live, and this realization completely shatters the equanimity of Devaduta. The story goes on to explore the relevance of a Prophet in a world deemed to be created without hierarchies by God.

== Cast ==
The presentation is in the form of Devaduta’s narrative of her life. The character is played by Savitha Sastry.

== Production ==
Production of The Prophet was started in March 2013 around the time that Savitha Sastry’s previous production Yudh was being performed across India. In line with her other productions such as Soul Cages or Yudh, The Prophet too steers clear of conventional Bharatanatyam themes of a nayika (heroine) pining for love, or pieces based on Bhakti (devotion), and instead delivers an original and contemporary story not based in religion or Indian mythology. The production used several effects from theater such as special lighting, use of voiceovers and narratives in the soundtrack.

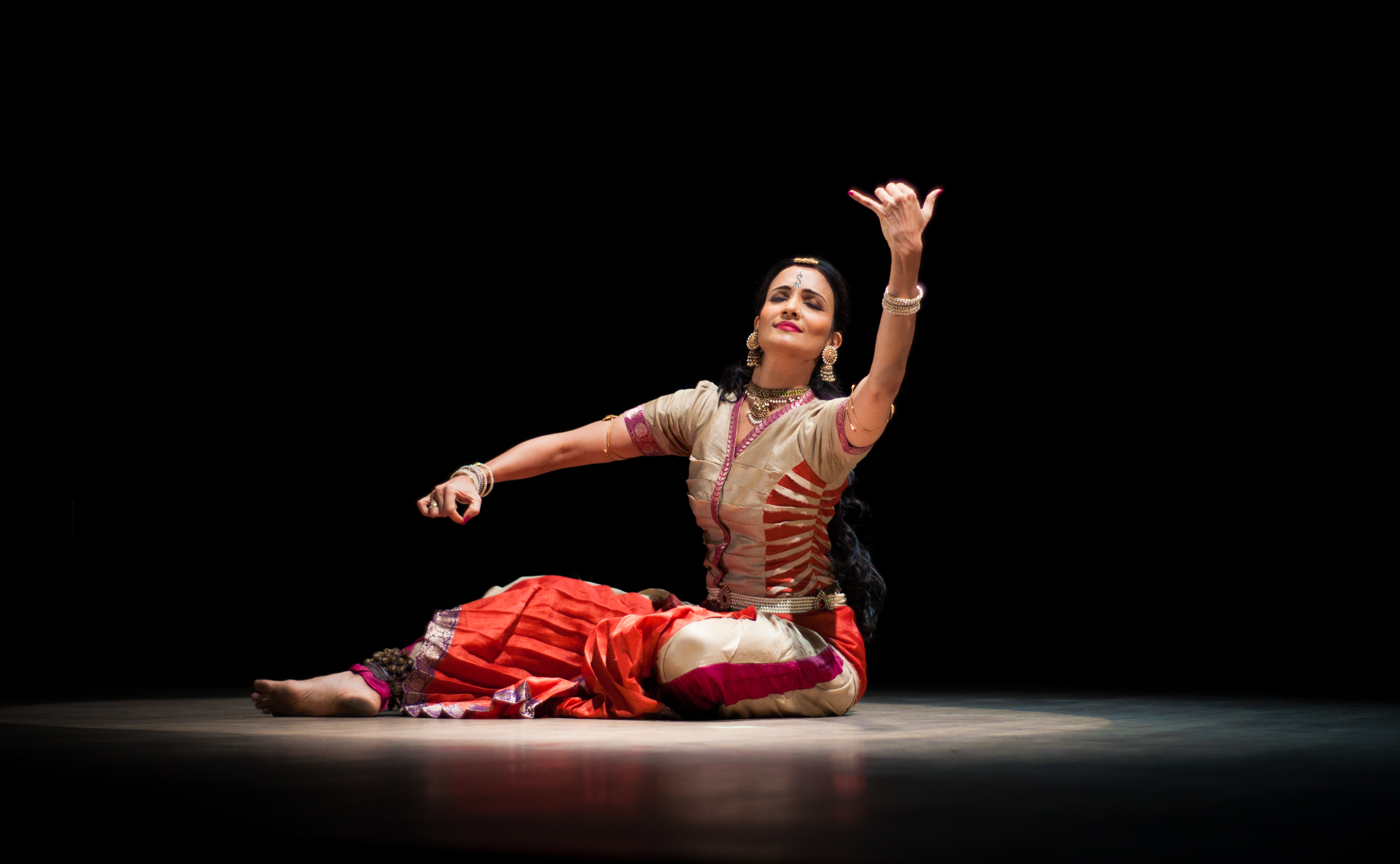
Savitha Sastry performing The Prophet at ADA Ranga Mandira, Bangalore (2013)

== Critical reception ==
‘The Prophet’ received overwhelmingly positive reviews from art critics. A review in the Indian Express praised it highly with the words "the production carries an intensity that will leave the audience thinking about it for a very long time" and goes on to say "the exquisite choreography and denouement add up to something far more than an evening of entertainment – it becomes an experience." Noted art critic Soumya Vajpayee of the Hindustan Times called Savitha "An innovator – widely credited for the way the genre is presented and perceived." Critic Lakshmi Ramakrishna of the Channel 6 magazine lauded the production with the words "Savitha and Srikanth have revolutionized Bharatanatyam". Critic Anannya Chaterjee of Absolute India noted in her review that "the audience were seen glued to their seats even after the curtain call". The Times of India recommended the Prophet calling it ‘an enigmatic recital’. Critic Boski Gupta of the DNA praised Savitha’s choreography with the words "…known for her beautiful renditions of classical dances in contemporary style."

== Credits ==
- Artistic Direction and Choreography: Savitha Sastry
- Production, Story, Song Lyrics, Script: AK Srikanth
- Music: Rajkumar Bharathi
- Lyrics Translation in Hindi: Dr. Amrendra Nath Tripathi
- Lyrics Translation in Tamil: Niranjan Bharathi
- Sound Analyst: Sai Shravanam (Resound Studios, Chennai)
- Narration: Govind Venkatesh and Sunanda
- Technical Direction: Victor Paulraj (Studio7, Chennai)
- Design and Photographs: Aditya Sastry (Lost Arrow Studio, California)
- Brand Design: Vinay Srinivasan (California)
- Vocals: Krithika Arvind (Tamil) & Savitha Shravanam (Hindi)
- Keyboard and Harmonica: Vijayshankar
- Mrdangam: Sundaresan
- Ghatam: Kartik
- Tabla and other percussion: Ganesh Rao
- Shehnai: S. Ballesh
- Veena: Bhavani Prasad
- Sitar and Zitar: L Kishore
- Violin and Strings: Embar Kannan (Carnatic), Yensone and group (Western)

== Dance film ==
In 2019, The Prophet was released in digital format as a free to view online dance film.
