= Sakuntalam =

- Directed by: Dushyanth Sridhar
- Produced by: Dushyanth Sridhar; Srinivas Kannaa under (Desika Daya Productions)
- Starring: Payal Vijay Shetty; Shubham Jaibeer Sahrawat; Y Gee Mahendra; T V Varadarajan; Mohanram
- Cinematography: Magi Natesh
- Edited by: B Lenin
- Music by: Rajkumar Bharathi(music Director), Sai Shravanam(Music producer)
- Production company: Desika Daya Productions
- Release date: 2022
- Running time: 96 minutes
- Country: India
- Language: Sanskrit

Sakuntalaṃ (Sanskrit Language: Śakuntalā) is a Sanskrit historical film directed by Dushyanth Sridhar, a renowned speaker, writer and researcher on Indian scriptures. It is an adaptation of Kalidasa's work Abhijnana Shakuntalam. The film is produced by Dushyanth Sridhar and Srinivas Kannaa under Desika Daya Productions. The movie stars debutants Shubham Sahrawat and Payal Shetty in the leading roles.

== Cast and Crew ==
Apart from the Director and producer, there are some key people who are associated with this film project. Rajkumar Bharati, the great-grandson of Subramania Bharathi, has composed the music while Sai Shravanam, the sound recordist of the Academy Award-winning film Life Of Pi, is the music producer for the film. Two-time National Award-winner AS Lakshminarayan has done the audiography and the editing of the film is done by five-time National Award-winner B Lenin. National Award Winner Pattanam Rasheed is the makeup artist in the film. The costume designer of the film is a Chennai-based textile designer Lakshmi Srinath.

- Payal Vijay Shetty as Sakuntala
- Shubham Jaibeer Sahrawat as Dushyanta
- Siri Chandrasekhar as Anasuya
- Subhaga Santhosh as Priyamvada
- Pavithra Srinivasan as Gautami
- Y Gee Mahendra as Kanva
- T V Varadarajan as Vaikhanasa
- Mohanram as Durvasa
- Renjith-Vijna as Vishwamitra-Menaka
- Sanjeev S as Sharngarava
- R Lakshminarayanan as Shardvata
- Raaghav Ranganathan as Madhavya
- C Lakshmi Kumar as Bhadrasena
- S M Sivakumar as Somarata
- Ramya Ramnarayan as Rajamata
- Maanas Chavali as Syala
- Govindasamy as Purusha
- K Balaji and K Bharathwaj as Tapasvi
- Shambhavi Jagadish as Tapasvini
- Dwarkesh Srivatsan as Raivataka
- Master Vishnu Kaushik as Bharata(Sarvadamana)
- C S Karthic Kumar as Suta
- Harish as Matali

== Critical Response and Accolades ==
At the Rajasthan International Film Festival held at Jodhpur, the movie won the Special Viewers' choice award for Best Regional Feature Film. Tejas Punia in Bollywoodlocha awarded 4 stars for the movie while saying, "Sridhar has made his debut movie in a very beautiful manner, no matter how many times you have read this work, you will want to watch this movie".
