= Color symbolism =

Use of color for symbolic purposes

Color symbolism in art, literature, and anthropology is the use of color as a symbol in various cultures and in storytelling. There is great diversity in the use of colors and their associations between cultures and even within the same culture in different time periods. The same color may have very different associations within the same culture at any time. Diversity in color symbolism occurs because color meanings and symbolism occur on an individual, cultural and universal basis. Color symbolism is also context-dependent and influenced by changes over time. Symbolic representations of religious concepts or articles may include a specific color with which the concept or object is associated.

== Common associations ==
=== Red ===
Red is a primary color across all models of colour space. It is the color of blood. It is often associated with love, passion, and lust but also danger and aggression. It is frequently used in relation to Valentine's Day. It can also be used to signify danger or warning, but it is also associated with importance. For instance, it is used for stop signs and fire engines. In contemporary China, red is often used to symbolize good luck or happiness, and is used for many holidays or weddings. However, red and black frequently appear in ancient Chinese tombs in graves—as red was associated with death at the time. Red was also associated with death in ancient Egypt, as mummies were wrapped in cloth dyed with hematite. As such, Osiris—god of the afterlife and underworld—was known as the "lord of the red cloth." Historically, the color red has been associated with communism alongside symbols like the hammer and sickle.

=== Blue ===
Blue is a primary color across all models of color space. It is the color of the ocean and the sky; it often symbolizes serenity, stability, inspiration, or wisdom. It can be a calming color, and symbolize reliability. The decision of many businesses and organizations to use darker shades of blue may be derived from the respectability associated with navy blue, which in turn was chosen by naval armed forces to help clothes resist weathering at sea. In the Catholic Church, the Virgin Mary is most often depicted wearing blue, to symbolize being "full of grace" by divine favor. Blue is widely used for baby boys' clothes or bedrooms, although the reason blue is so strongly associated with boys is debated. Blue can also represent sadness and depression ("they have the blues").

=== Yellow ===
Yellow is a primary color in many models of color space, and a secondary in all others. It is a color often associated with sunshine or joy. It is sometimes used in association with cowardice or fear, i.e., the phrase "yellow-bellied". Yellow can also be associated with sin, contamination, or sickness. Children tend to like this color, and it is used to market products to children; it is also used for warning signs, school buses and taxi cabs since it is such a bright, noticeable color. Blonde hair is often associated with sex. In India, yellow symbolizes peace and knowledge, and is associated with Krishna.

=== Green ===
Green is a primary color in many models of color space, and a secondary in all others. It is most often used to represent nature, healing, health, youth, or fertility, since it is such a dominant color in nature. It can be a very relaxing color but is also used in the US to symbolize money, greed, sickness or jealousy. Saying that someone is "green" means they are inexperienced or new. Green is also commonly associated with environmentally-friendly politics (e.g., the green party).

=== Orange ===
Orange is a secondary color across many models of color space. Symbolically, orange is a stimulating color. It is often associated with amusement, extroversion, fire, energy and activity. Relatedly, redheads—people with ginger-orange or reddish hair—are stereotyped as fiery and intense. Orange is the color most closely associated with autumn and its leaves. It is one of the most attention-grabbing colors in human vision, and is often used to attract the eye (traffic cones, safety vests, etc.).

=== Black ===
Black is a primary color across all models of color space. In Western culture, it is considered a negative color and usually symbolizes death, grief, or evil but also depression. People often wear black for mourning, although this practice is not as widespread as it was in the past. People also wear black as a fashion statement, as in the hearkening saying that a given color "is the new black."

=== White ===
White is a primary color across all models of color space. It most often symbolizes perfection, faith, innocence, softness, and cleanliness. White can also be associated with money and power—since fabrics such as wool and cotton have historically needed laborious processing to appear whiter. Brides often wear white dresses to symbolize purity. However, in some Asian cultures, white represents death and/or mourning.

=== Pink ===
Pink is a prominent secondary or tertiary color in many color space models. It is associated with softness, sweetness, love, and immaturity. In the late 1800s, pink was gender-coded for boys and blue was gender-coded for girls—despite the color coding swapping over the past century. Del Giudice (2012) argues that pink-blue gender coding has been broadly consistent in the UK and the US since it appeared around 1890.

=== Purple ===
Purple is a secondary color of color space. It is commonly associated with power. The laborious expense of creating Tyrian purple led to purple's association with excess and royalty. Likewise, historically, murasaki—a deep purple of Japan—was deemed off-limits to ordinary people. As part of Victorian flower symbolism, the color of heliotrope's purple flowers often was used by grieving widows during their deceased spouse's funerals to symbolize devotion.

=== Brown ===
Brown is a shade of yellows, oranges, and reds. It is historically and prehistorically common in art due to its natural abundance through clay minerals. Since bright, vibrant colors have been harder to come by throughout history and therefore seen as more valuable, brown had been a symbol of poverty. St. Clair also claims that more recently, though, in response to a cultural distaste for conspicuous wealth, brown has gained popularity as a more humble color. For example, brown was common as a natural, earthy color in the Arts and Crafts movement as a counter-cultural response to Victorian magnificence. Khaki became a symbol for military clothing after the British armed forces began using this color for camouflage in the Indian subcontinent during the late 1800s.

== In marketing ==
Color plays an important role in setting expectations for a product and communicating its key characteristics. Color is the second most important element that allows consumers to identify brand packaging.

Marketers for products with an international market navigate the color symbolism variances between cultures with targeted advertising. Car manufacturer Volkswagen ran a commercial in Italy with a black sheep in the middle of a larger flock symbolizing those who owned a VW Golf as unique and self-assured among a crowd of others who were not. In several cultures around the world, a black sheep represents an outcast and is seen as something undesirable, while in Italy, a black sheep represents confidence and independence.

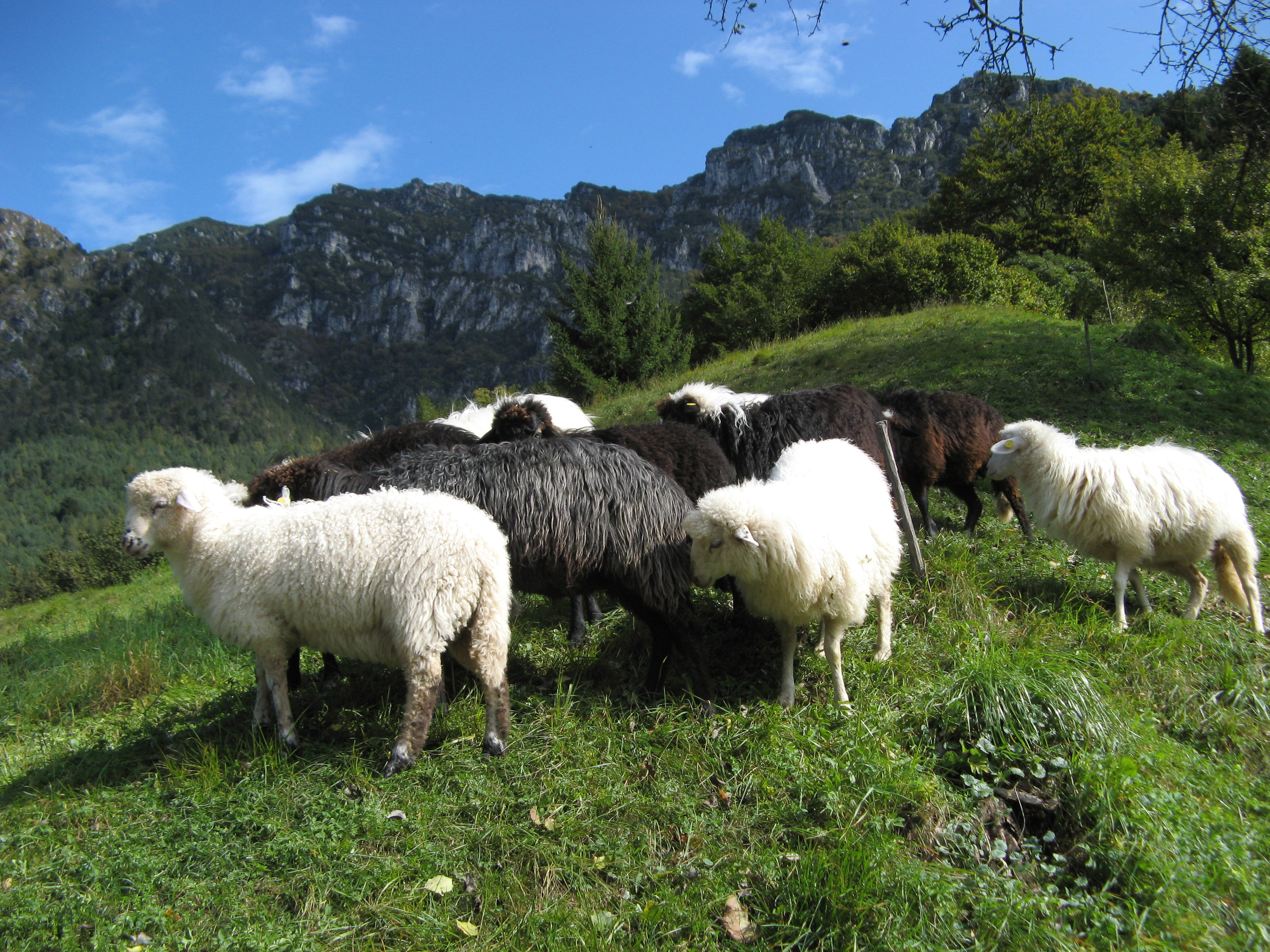
A flock of black and white sheep grazing in the Italian countryside

There are many additional variances in color symbolism between cultures. Cold is symbolized by blue in East Asia, the US, and Sweden while warmth is symbolized by yellow in the US and by blue in The Netherlands. Sometimes the meanings of colors are in stark opposition across geographic boundaries, requiring products marketed to specific demographics to account for those changes across different markets. For instance, femininity is symbolized by blue in The Netherlands and pink in the US, whereas masculinity is symbolized by blue in Sweden and the US, and red in the UK and France. In some instances color symbolism in marketing is constructed. The sales volume of a company whose product is defined by the name of its color is susceptible to the symbolism and association of that name — in one example, a company selling a paint color named "off white" more than doubled its sales simply by renaming the same color "ancient silk".

== Conceptualizations of colors cross-culturally ==
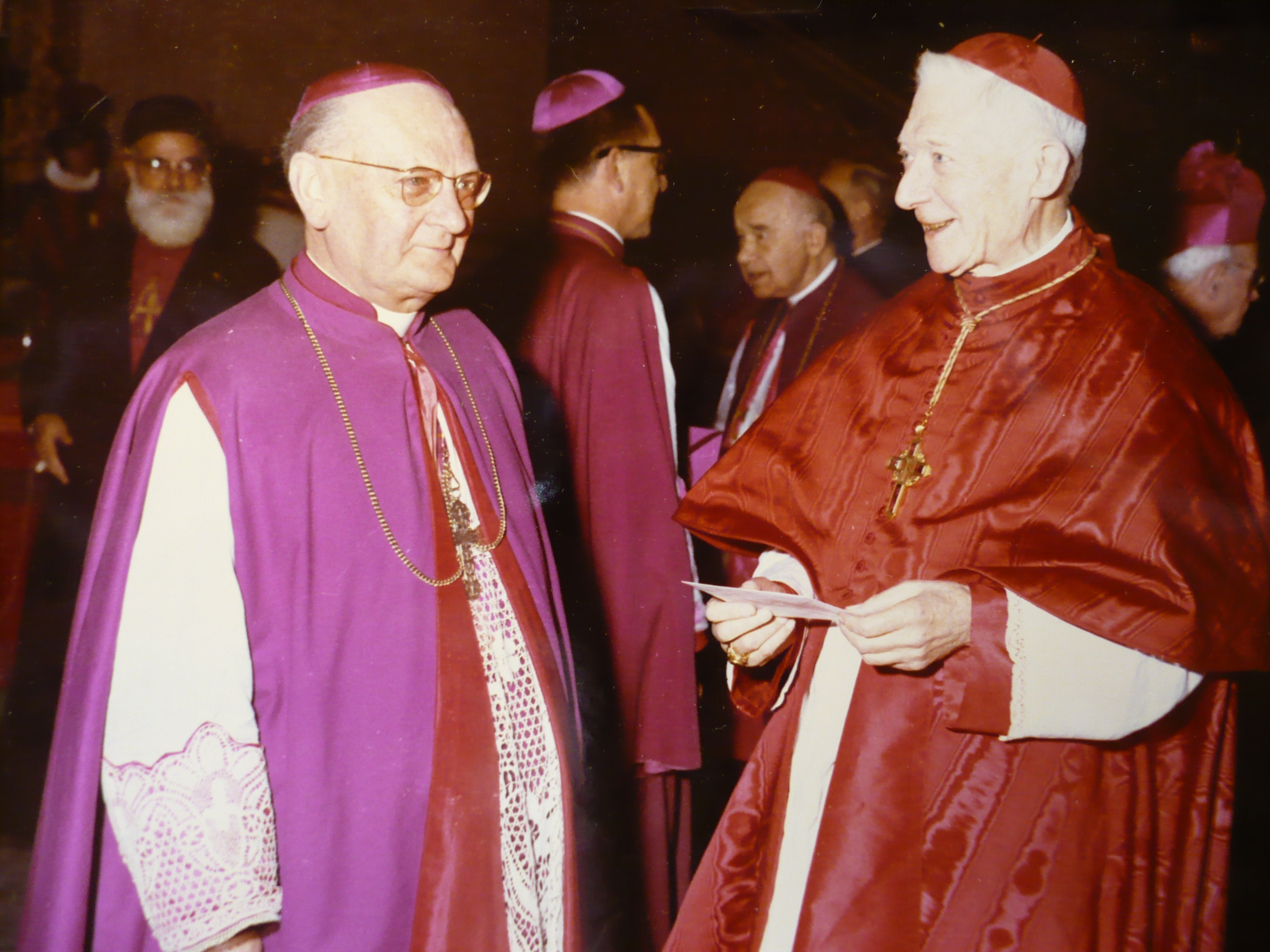
A Catholic archbishop and cardinal in choir dress. Bishops traditionally wear purple, cardinals red.

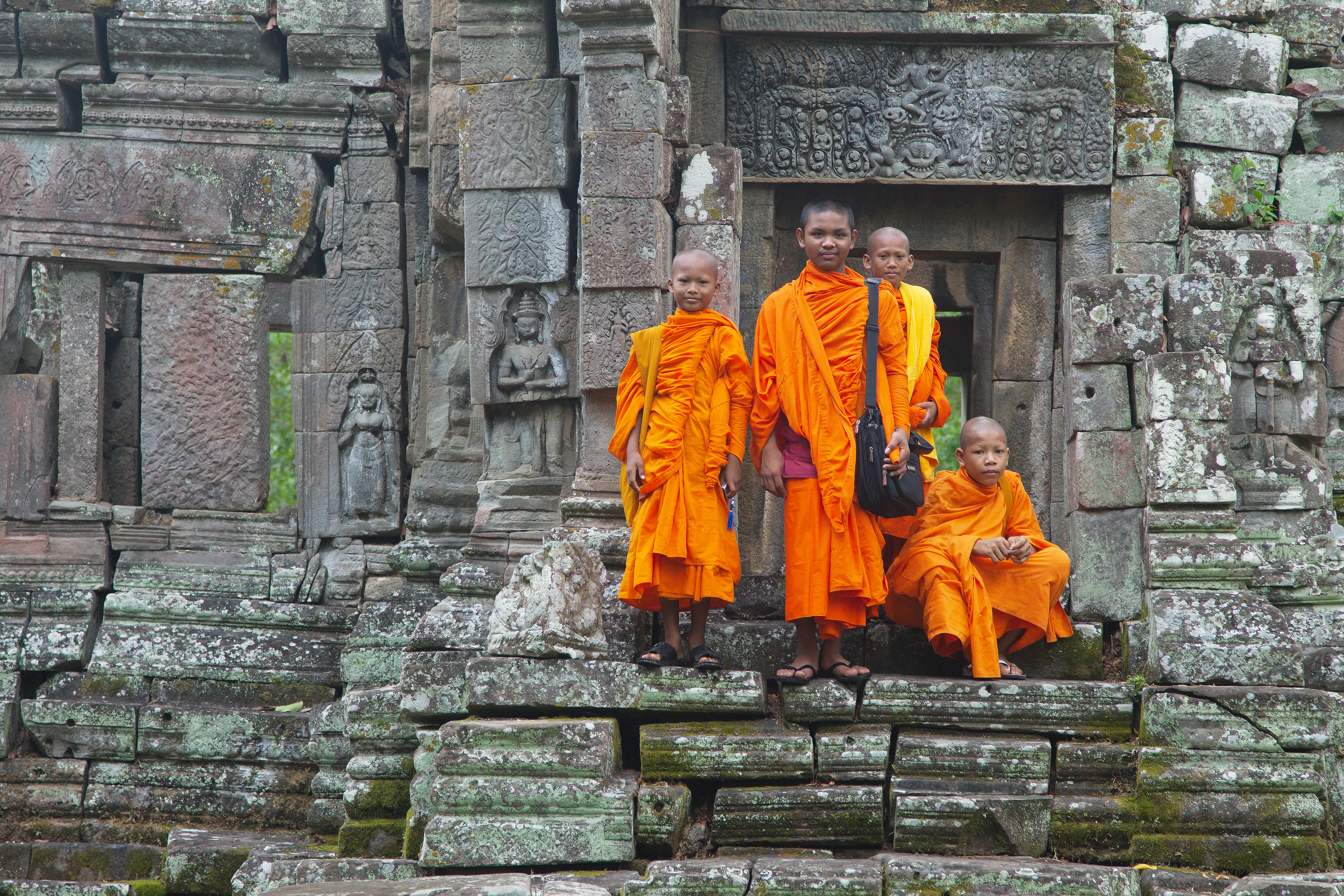
A group of young Buddhist monks in Cambodia. Orange, symbolizing enlightenment, is an important color in Buddhism.

Color symbolism has changed over time. Between the 5th and 17th centuries, interpretations of color were largely related to religious contexts. Blue was symbolic of heaven and white of purity. Today, purity is still symbolized by white in Australia and the US but by blue in other countries like India. Similarly, the church influenced the perception of colors like crimson and purple. Largely because the dyes for these colors could only be sourced from precious pigments, religious figures like Madonna, Cardinals and the Virgin were seen in scarlet and purple. Today, purple symbolizes evil and infidelity in Japan, but the same is symbolized by blue in East Asia and by yellow in France. Additionally, the sacred color of Hindu and Buddhist monks is orange. The Renaissance was also a time in which black and purple were colors of mourning. Today, mourning or death is symbolized by white in East Asia, black in the US, and blue in Iran, while happiness is symbolized by white in Australia and NZ, and yellow in China.

There is a general disagreement over whether reactions to color and their symbolism are a result of cultural conditioning or of instinct. Several studies concluded that color is part of the social learning process because of the significant symbolism within the culture. High quality, trustworthiness, and dependability are symbolized by blue in the US, Japan, Korea and green and yellow in China—as well as purple in China, South Korea, and Japan. Because of these variances, critical cues vary across cultures. Warning signs are coded differently as a danger is symbolized by green in Malaysia and red in the US and Mexico. The same color of green symbolizes envy in Belgium and the US, but envy is symbolized by yellow in Germany and Russia, and purple in Mexico. Even the colors that denote powerful emotions vary. Love is symbolized by green in Japan, red and purple in China, Korea, Japan, and the US. Unluckiness is symbolized by red in Chad, Nigeria, and Germany. Luckiness is symbolized by red in China, Denmark, and Argentina. The traditional bridal color is red in China and white in the US. Ambition and desire are symbolized by red in India.

One example in which different conceptualizations of color may lead to confusion is the coloring of upward or downward trends in international quoted prices; whereas in most of the world green or blue is used to denote an upward trend and red is used to denote a downward trend, in mainland China, Japan, South Korea, and Taiwan, the reverse is true. This confusion often leads to Western media outlets using incorrect or reversed headline images to accompany reports of a major economic upturn or downturn in an Asian market.

== History ==
Prior to its being widely studied in a scientific context, color symbolism was theorized upon by curious individuals in other humanities. These early theoreticians include German polymath Johann Wolfgang von Goethe (in his Theory of Colours) and Russian abstract artist Wassily Kandinsky (in his Concerning the Spiritual in Art, among others). Although color treatises such as these are often unscientific (Kandinsky, for instance, was heavily influenced by Theosophy), they occasionally find resonance with artists, philosophers and others working in "softer" subjects.

== See also ==
- Color code
- Color psychology
- Color term
- Color theory
- Political color
- The Colors Trilogy
- Three Colours trilogy
