= Artistic symbol =

Representation that conveys deeper meaning

In works of art, literature, and narrative, a symbol is a concrete element like an object, character, image, situation, or action that suggests or hints at abstract, deeper, or non-literal meanings or ideas. The use of symbols artistically is symbolism. In literature, such as novels, plays, and poems, symbolism goes beyond just the literal written words on a page, since writing itself is also inherently a system of symbols.

Artistic symbols may be intentionally built into a work by its creator, which in the case of narratives can make symbolism a deliberate narrative device. However, it also may be decided upon by the audience or by a consensus of scholars through their interpretation of the work. Various synonyms exist for this type of symbol, based on specific genre, artistic medium, or domain: visual symbol, literary symbol, poetic symbol, etc.

== Examples ==
Some symbolism appears commonly in works of poetry, fiction, or visual art. For instance, often, a rose symbolizes beauty; a lion symbolizes strength; and certain colors symbolize national flags and thus, by extension, certain nations. The latter is specifically an example of color symbolism.

While symbols can recur within or even across cultures, other symbols recur only in the context of one particular work. For instance, scholars widely consider references to blood in the play Macbeth by William Shakespeare to be symbolism for the main character's violent behavior and his accompanying guilt. In the novel The Great Gatsby by F. Scott Fitzgerald, the image of huge bespectacled eyes on a billboard may be interpreted as symbolizing the gaze of God.
