= Dushyanth Sridhar =

Indian film director and writer

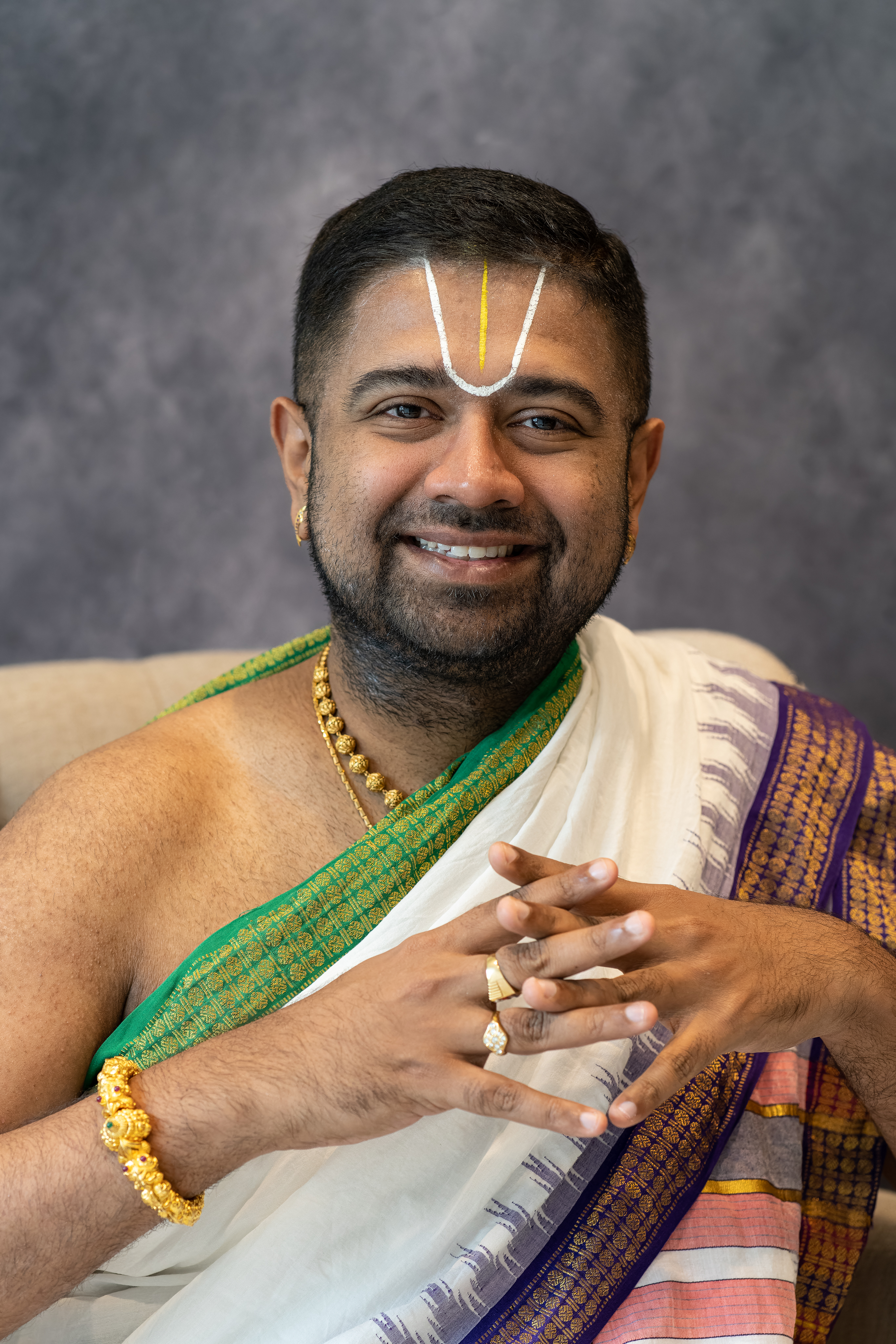
- Born: Dushyanth Sridhar; September 19, 1986 (age 40); Bengaluru, Karnataka, India
- Education: NSN Matriculation Higher Secondary School; BITS Pilani
- Website: https://www.desikadaya.org/

Dushyanth Sridhar is a speaker, and delivers talks on Hindu spiritual topics, including the Ramayana, Mahabharata, Bhagavata Mahapurana, Vishnu Purana, Divya Prabandham, and the lives and works of Hindu saints. He renders traditional pravacana (discourses), is a harikatha exponent, author, director and actor.

He manages Deśika Dayā, a charitable trust that carries out cultural and spiritual activities.

== Education ==
Dushyanth Sridhar completed his schooling from NSN Matriculation Higher Secondary School and completed his graduation in Chemical Engineering and postgraduation in Chemistry from BITS Pilani.

=== Gurus and Acaryas ===
He has learnt Śrī Bhāṣyam, Gītā Bhāṣyam, Rahasya Traya Sāram, Bhagavad Viṣayam, Śatadūṣaṇī and Tirunetuntāṇṭakam from ācāryas like Villivalam Śrī Nārāyaṇa Mahādeśika, Nāvalpākkam Śrī Rāmānuja Tātācār, Cetlur Śrī Śrīvatsānkācār, Nelvoy Śrī Soumyanārāyaṇācār, Villur Śrī Karuṇākarācār and Devanārvilāgam Śrī Sāranāthācār.

== Talks and Discourses ==
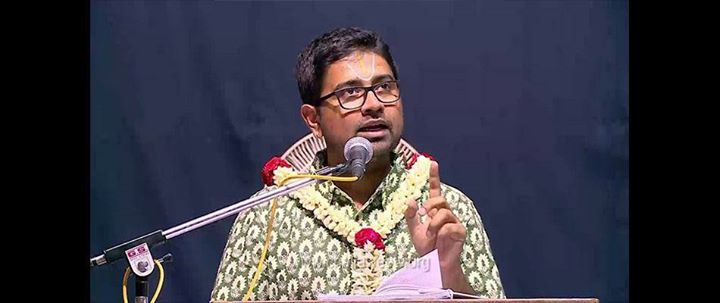
Sridhar delivering a discourse

Dushyanth Sridhar has delivered over 3,500 discourses across 23 countries.

== Productions ==
He has conceptualized and produced classical dance productions including ‘Agre Paśyāmi’, ‘Rāmāyaṇa Sudhā’, ‘Śrīnivāsam Prapadye’ and ‘Araṅganin Pādaiyyil’.

== Movies ==
=== Actor ===
Dushyanth Sridhar acted as the protagonist in the Maṇipravāla movie 'Vedānta Deśika', produced and directed by veteran film-maker Muktha Srinivasan (2018). The movie was a portrayal of the life of Swamy Vedanta Desika. He learnt maṇipravāla (a mixture of Tamil and Sanskrit, spoken in earlier times), and wrote the storyline and dialogues for the movie.

=== Director ===
Dushyanth Sridhar directed the Sanskrit movie Sakuntalam, starring Payal Vijay Shetty and Shubham Jaibeer Sahrawat. At the Rajasthan International Film Festival held at Jodhpur, the movie won the Special Viewers’ Choice award for Best Regional Feature Film.

== Web-tele series ==
=== Special appearance ===
Year	Title	Role	Notes	Ref.
2023	Periyavaa	Himself(episode 14 &15)	aired in Web channel in Bombay Chanakya's FastFlix; later re-aired in Sri Sankara TV channel.	

== Books ==
Dushyanth Sridhar authored a coffee-table book titled ‘Vedānta Deśika – the peerless poet-preceptor’ for the JSJS trust (2018).

In 2024, he published ‘Rāmāyanam – Vol 1’ (HarperCollins). In it, Dushyanth presents the Ramayana as a dialogue between Narada and Valmiki.

== Yatras (Heritage Tours) ==
In the last decade, Dushyanth Sridhar has organized heritage tours to 200 temples with over 3,500 yātrīs. The yātrās have been organized to Divya Desams and Abhimana Sthalams in India, Bhutan, Cambodia, Nepal, Indonesia and Sri Lanka. During these yātrās, he has rendered discourses (in Tamil) on ancient Hindu scriptures, and details of the visiting sites, in both aspects viz. religion and architecture.

== Religious activism ==
=== PIL filed over Tirupathi Laddu Adulteration ===
On 19 September 2024, a massive controversy erupted when the Chief Minister of Andhra Pradesh, Chandrababu Naidu, claimed that, during the administration of the former Chief Minister, Y.S. Jagan Mohan Reddy, the ghee used for Tirupati laddu offered by the Sri Vekateswara Swamy Temple, Tirumala to its devotees included beef tallow, fish oil, and pig lard in its ingredients. The news of adulteration of the offerings that would be sanctified and offered to devotees sparked outrage, with many accusing the authorities of disrespecting religious sentiments.

On 24 September 2024, Dushyanth Sridhar, along with historian and author Vikram Sampath, filed a Public Interest Litigation (PIL) in the Supreme Court of India, to move the Court to establish accountability in Hindu temples managed by government bodies, and to divest government / bureaucratic hold over temples.

== Awards and Recognitions ==
2023	Rāma Bhakti Prachāra Mani Title by SASTRA Satsangh T S Balakrishna Sastrigal Award of Excellence by TSB Family National Health Award by AYUSH TV Pravacana Vachaspati Title by V Narayana Iyer Memorial Trust
2023	Vāk Vilāsa Amrita Ratnam Title by Amara Bharati Publications Sri Chandrasekharendra Saraswati National Eminence Award from SIES Institution
2022	Sat-sampradāya Prachāra Kesari Title by Sri Hayagreeva Vidyā Peetam Bhāratiya Sanskriti Jāgran Puraskār Title by Carnatica Archival Centre
2021	Pravachana Ratna Mani Title by Poundareekapuram Srimad Andavan Ashramam
2018	Sarva Kalā Chudāmani Title by Sri Hayagreeva Vidyā Peetam Notable Alumnus Award from NSN Group of Institutions
2016	Harikathā Bhārati Title by Bhārat Kalāchār Young Achievers Award from Rotary International
2014	Bhāgawata Bhāswan Sri Anjan Nambudiri Memorial Award by Mahālingapuram Sri Ayyappan Bhakta Sabhā
2012	Global ‘30 under 30’ Award from BITSAA International
