= Savitha Sastry =

Indian dancer

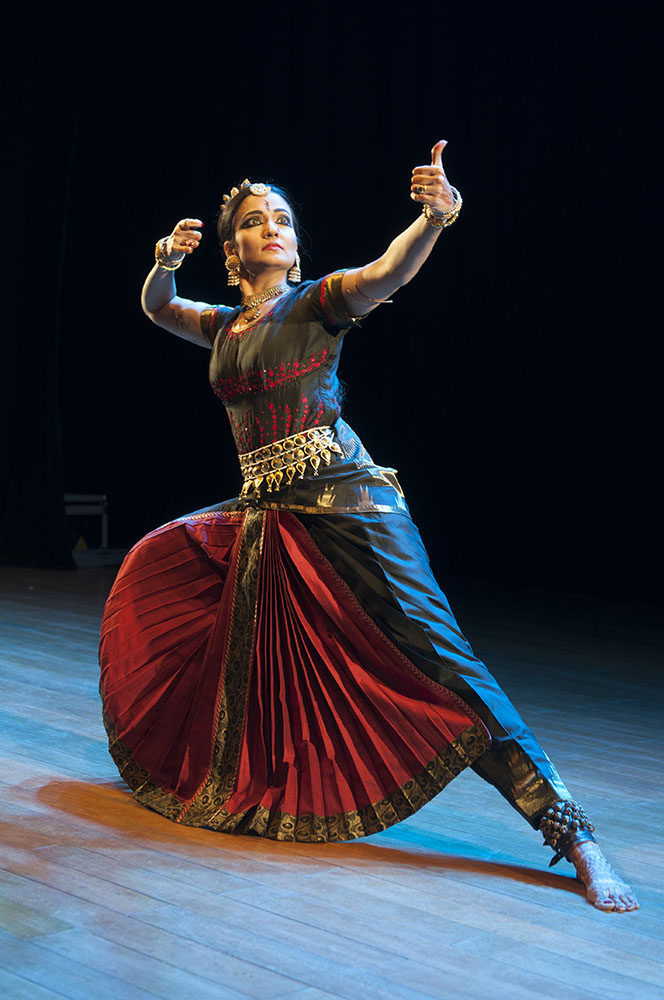
- Sastry performing Yudh at the Music Academy Chennai (2013)
- Born: Savitha Subramaniam; 11 August 1969 (age 57); Hyderabad, India
- Education: Stella Maris College, Chennai
- Occupations: Bharatanatyam choreographer and dancer
- Years active: 1981–present
- Spouse: AK Srikanth
- Website: savithasastry.com

Savitha Sastry (born 11 August 1969) is an Indian dancer and choreographer best known as an exponent of Bharatanatyam. She is known to experiment with the format of traditional Bharatanatyam by using the techniques of Bharatanatyam to showcase theme-based productions based on novel stories, not based on Indian mythology or religion. Her innovations have been described as 'path breaking' by critics. and she is considered to be a 'renaissance architect' who 'holds the distinction of being the dancer to have brought out a revolution in the way Bharatanatyam is presented after Rukmini Devi Arundale'.

== Early life and education ==
Savitha Subramaniam was born in Hyderabad, and later lived in Mumbai before her family relocated to their home town of Chennai. She started her training in Bharatanatyam under the tutelage of Guru Mahalingam Pillai at the Sri Rajarajeswari Bharatha Natya Kala Mandir in Mumbai, and later with Adyar K Lakshman and the Dhananjayans in Chennai. She did her schooling at the P.S Senior Secondary School in Chennai, and her graduation from Stella Maris College.

In 1986, she featured as the lead dancer in the Tamil film Ananda Tandavam, a production of her Guru Adyar K Lakshman. She pursued her master's degree in the United States, where she majored in neuroscience.

== Bharatanatyam ==
Through the 1980s, 1990s and the first decade of the millennium, Sastry had performed mostly traditional repertoires of Bharatanatyam. She produced and choreographed a few full length presentations such as Krishna: The Supreme Mystic and Purushartha during this phase.

She is credited to have a high degree of technical proficiency in her kinetics of the dance form in being able to deliver it with the grace and technique demanded of Bharatanatyam performers. Sydney-based critic Hamsa Venkat referred to "Savitha's crisp nritta (pure dance), clean lines and flawless aramandi was a breath of fresh air, and truly inspirational for students of dance." The Audition Panel of the San Francisco Ethnic Dance Festival described her dancing with the words "Moves like a temple sculpture come to life".

== Notable productions ==
By 2009, Sastry departed from performing traditional margams (the traditional order in which classical dance is performed), and started her work on theme based productions. Sastry is noted for the use of contemporary and original story lines in her performances and her portrayal of multiple characters as a solo performer in them, which is a marked departure from the traditional Bharatanatyam theme of the nayika (the heroine) pining for love or pieces based on Bhakti (devotion) alone. Some of her notable productions include Music Within (2010), Soul Cages (2012), The Prophet: Destiny. Divinity. Doubt and Chains: Love Stories of Shadows (2015).

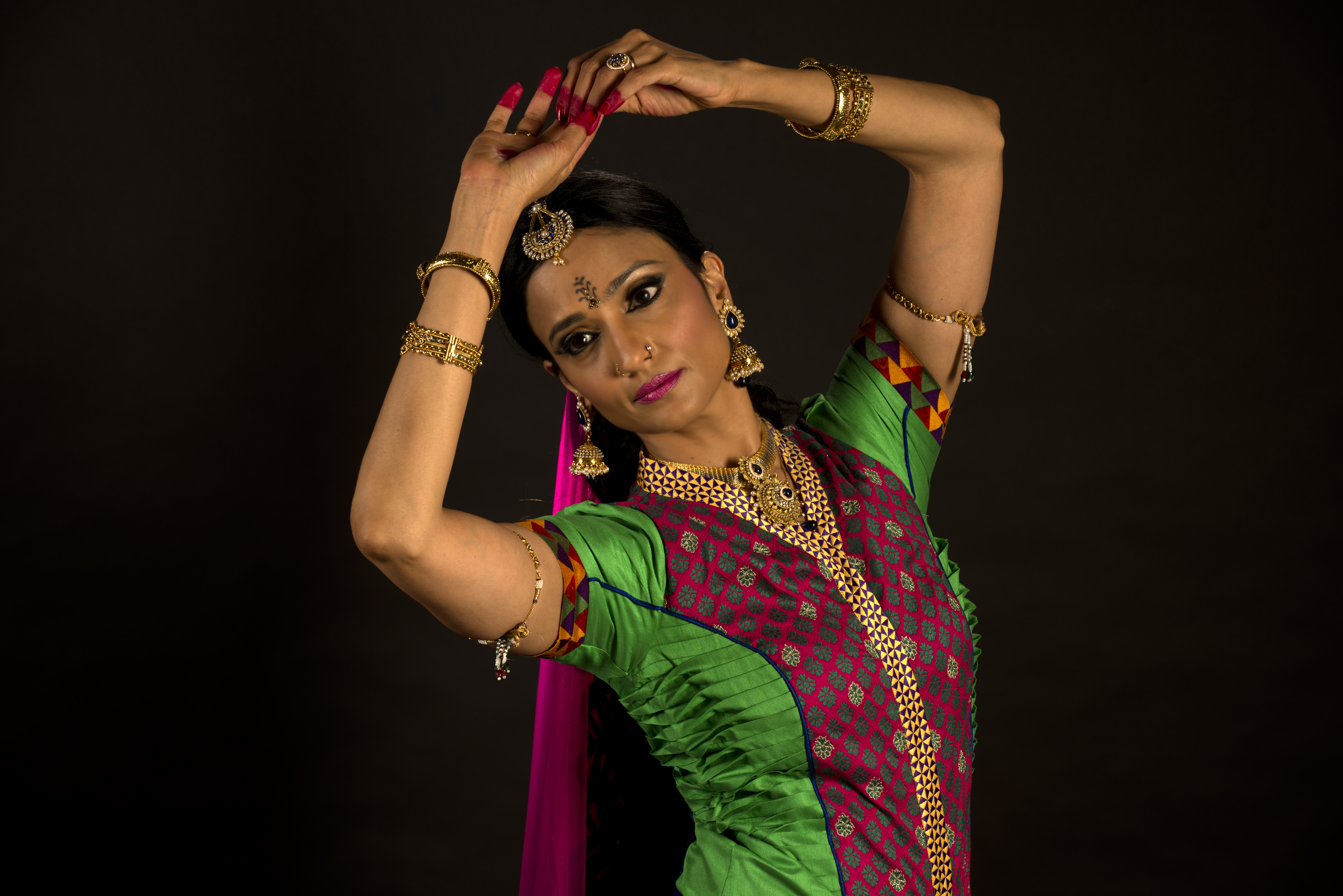
Sastry performing Chains: Love Stories of Shadows at NCPA Mumbai (2015)

Sastry has been critically lauded not only for her technique, but also for her innovations in the art form to take it to a wider audience. A profile story in the Times of India reported "(Savitha) has merged contemporary content with the centuries old dance form to create a unique niche"

Critic Fozia Yasin of the Asian Age notes that Sastry "aims to bring about a renaissance in the traditional art form by marrying the aesthetics of Bharatanatyam with the power of an intelligent and novel story-line." Critic Nonika Singh of The Tribune wrote, "Knocking down pigeonholes as she breaks free, she hopes to inspire more and more aspiring dancers to soar along, in the vast expanse of tradition minus the baggage of restrictive thinking!" Critic Yamini Walia of the Afternoon Despatch & Courier reports that "her path breaking work has been recognised as a renaissance by critics and audiences all over the world."

All her productions have been based on short stories by her husband, AK Srikanth, and the soundtrack for the productions have been composed by Rajkumar Bharathi, the great grandson of the veteran poet Subramania Bharathi. These have been performed in the Indian Subcontinent, Australia, South East Asia, the Middle East, Africa, Europe and the Americas, and the productions have met with critical and popular acclaim. Another hallmark of Sastry's presentations is a Q & A session that she and Srikanth have with the audience at the end of the performance where the audience discuss the presentation with the performer and writer. Critic Lakshmi Ramakrishna of the Hindu praised this teamwork with the words "The husband – wife duo has struck a chord with audiences in conveying deeply philosophical thoughts with striking simplicity, élan and elegance"

She has been labeled the "Dancing Storyteller" by the popular press following these productions.

== Digital productions ==
Since 2018, Sastry and AK Srikanth have been releasing their productions on free to stream digital platforms to take their work to a world audience. They also produce short classical dance videos that narrate a unique story, on the same lines of popular music videos. The short films have been nominated in over 50 film festivals across the world.

Their first release, The Descent was based on the story of a fallen superstar, and dealt with themes of depression. The film was awarded the Best Short Film 2019 at the Calcutta International Cult Film Festival, The Top Shorts Awards, the Near Nazareth Festival and the Best Global Short. It was also nominated at the John Abraham International Short Film Festival, the 5th Jaipur Film World 2021, Venice Film Awards, Cannes Short Film Festival, FilmFest by Rogue Dancer, Open Window International Film Challenge, Conceptsion International Film Awards, Mumbai 9th Indian Cine Festival 2021, the 11th Dada Saheb Phalke Film Festival 2021, Florence Film Awards, and the First Time Filmmaker Sessions.

2020 and 2021 saw Srikanth and Savitha releasing their much acclaimed Colors Trilogy. The series of three films was based on the colors of the Indian National Flag - Green, White and Saffron. The stories juxtaposed the ideals behind these colors as envisaged by the Founding Fathers of Indian independence, with the lives of women in modern day India. The first part of the trilogy, Colors: Green is said to have been inspired by the life of Srikanth's mother. The second part - White is a biographical account of the story of her shift from traditional Bharatanatyam to the theme based productions she is famous for. The concluding part Saffron is a dystopian premise that portrays a prison that houses women that are deemed more successful than their men.

The series was hugely acclaimed, with Critics in Business Standard reporting "Writer AK Srikanth's story, while here as a short film, comes to life as it was written. And it is that much richer as an experience for all." DNA reported "The story is a befitting tribute to the strength and courage of a woman"

Beyond the Rains, the short film based on AK Srikanth's short story The Girl in the Bubble was released on Valentine's Eve in 2022. The film is said to be structured like a Haiku, and is noted for its delicate portrayal of the emotion of love. In June 2022, Savitha and Srikanth released their short film Dvija to critical acclaim. Dvija is based on a short story by Srikanth titled The Shrine, and was inspired by Ueda Akinari's Harusame Monogatari. The release of this film coincided with ten years of their production company.

September 2022 saw the release of 'Arangetram', a humorous take on the aspirations of the Indian middle class and their dreams. Critic Monika Monalisa of the Indian Express called the film "a breezy family entertainer, a genre that is hard to come by these days" A review by ANI commented that "While this short film enters around the character played by Savitha, every supporting actor also has quirks and eccentricities that makes the whole characterisation believable, and yet joyous." The review went on to add that "This short film is a throwback to the cinema of breezy comedies by stalwarts such as Amol Palekar, Hrishikesh Mukherjee and Basu Chatterjee." In March 2023, they released the second of their 'Families Trilogy' titled 'Filter Coffee'. Critic Monika Monalisa of the Indian Express described the film as one that would "remind the viewers of the breezy light-hearted films of the 70s."

In July 2023, Savitha launched her film 'Slow Rivers', also starring Bollywood thespian Ashish Vidyarthi. A review in the Indian Express described the film as "a story around the relationship between an artiste and her art, a mind-bender that paints its canvas through the real and the unreal." Critic Zeba Khan in her review of the film on WION commented that "Actor Ashish Vidyarthi and the protagonist Savitha Sastry star together for the first time, in roles that crackle with power every time the two appear on screen together. The confrontation between the two goes far beyond just their roles, into philosophies of the relationship between art and the artiste."

October 2023 saw the duo release their love story 'The Ghost of the Lighthouse', co-starring actor Jamie Alter, the son of Tom Alter. Critic Zeba Khan, in a review in WION described the film as "a touching vignette into the life of everyday people in small towns." Critic Pooja Das described the cinematography with the words "Breathtaking views of rolling hills, beautiful seaside beaches, and crashing waves on the shore."

In 2024, the couple released the cinematic version of their debut stage performance from 2012 - Soul Cages. Critic Prashant Tamta writing for DNA commented that the film "at its core, looks at the equilibrium between life and death." News Voir reported via the Print that "The film explores the delicate balance between life and death, weaving a story that is philosophically rich, extremely moving, and yet at the same time easy to understand.

The release of their first full length feature film 'A Song for Eresha' is scheduled for 2025. Co-starring debutante Mayurakshi Sen, Mekha Rajan and Arshya Lakshman in key roles, the film has been described as 'Poetry in Motion' by an ANI Press Report following a preview screening. Critic Neha Kirpal writing for The Hindu commented that the film seamlessly blends classical Indian dance with story telling.

== Dance theatre productions ==
- Purushartha (2002)
- Sacrifice (2003)
- Krishna – The Supreme Mystic (2006)
- Music Within (2010)
- Soul Cages: The story of Life, Death & Beyond (2012)
- Yudh – Three Perspectives, One Truth (2013)
- The Prophet: Destiny. Divinity. Doubt (2013)
- Chains: Love Stories of Shadows (2015)
- In God's Country (2015)
- Music Within - the Group Presentation (2020)

== Documentaries ==
- Elysian Pursuits: The Digital Years (2022)
- Elysian Pursuits: The Journey of Savitha Sastry (2015)
- Sex, Death & the Gods - a BBC documentary (2011)

== Short films ==
- The Descent (2019)
- Awakening (2019)
- Colors Trilogy: Green (2020)
- Colors Trilogy: White (2021)
- Colors Trilogy: Saffron (2021)
- Beyond the Rains (2022)
- Dvija (2022)
- Arangetram/ Rangapravesha (2022)
- Filter Coffee (2023)
- Slow Rivers (2023)
- The Ghost of the Lighthouse (2023)
- Soul Cages (2024)

== Feature films ==
- A Song for Eresha (2025)

== See also ==
- Indian women in dance
