= Yudh: Three perspectives, one truth =

Yudh
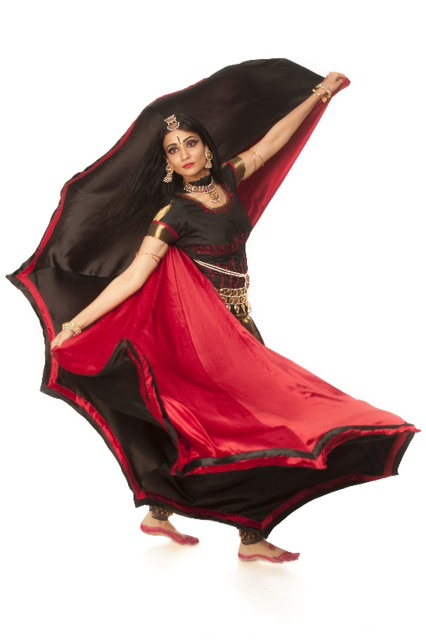
- Three Perspectives, One Truth
- Company: The Savitha Sastry Production Company
- Genre: Solo Bharatanatyam Dance Theatre
- Date of premiere: 2 February 2013

Creative team
- Producer & Writer: AK Srikanth
- Direction & Choreography: Savitha Sastry
- Music: Rajkumar Bharathi
- Technical Direction: Victor Paul Raj
- Costumes: Joy Antony

Yudh (the Battle) is a solo Bharatanatyam Dance Theatre production choreographed and performed by Savitha Sastry. It is based on a short story of the same name by AK Srikanth, and featured music by the Chennai-based music composer Rajkumar Bharathi, the great grandson of the veteran poet Subramania Bharathi. The production premiered on 2 February 2013 at Mumbai’s NCPA Auditorium and has since played all across India. The presentation was received with critical and popular acclaim.

== Plot ==
The central premise of Yudh is based on around the story of a young girl Pavitra, who is kidnapped from a park and never heard off again. Her grieving parents have spent their lives trying to come to terms with the loss of their child. The story then shifts to offering other perspectives to this incident, through the eyes of Satan and of God. In essence, the story implies that the war between Satan and God is now fought in the minds of humans, with both of them trying to exert their influence on the human. It concludes that the winner of this war between God and Satan is eventually determined in the human mind, even though humans may not be aware of this eternal battle, or the reason why they have to endure suffering for no fault of theirs.

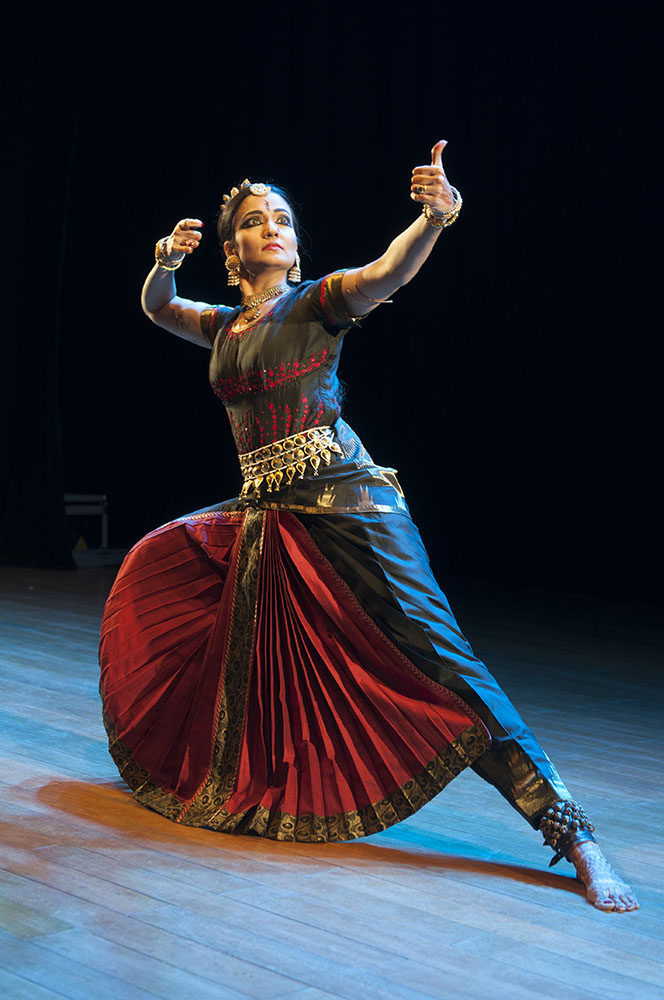
Savitha Sastry performing Yudh at the Music Academy Chennai (2013)

== Cast ==
The characters in the performance include Satan, God, the little girl Pavitra and her parents. Savitha Sastry plays all the characters.

== Production ==
Yudh continued Savitha’s attempts at communicating original stories not based on religion or Indian mythology through Bharatanatyam, in the lines of her previous productions Music Within and Soul Cages. Like Soul Cages, Yudh too steered clear of traditional Bharatanatyam themes of the nayika (the heroine) pining for love or pieces based on Bhakti (devotion) alone. The production used several effects from theater such as special lighting, use of voiceovers and narratives in the soundtrack.

== Critical reception ==
Yudh received largely positive reviews from critics. In particular, the storyline, the music and the choreography were well appreciated. SD Sharma, renowned critic from the Hindustan Times called it a "scintillating solo dance spectacle." Critic Arundhati Pattabhiraman of the Sunday Herald wrote "her art, with its breath of fresh air, is promising and insightful." A review of Yudh in the Deccan Herald praised it highly with the words "The stunning act was an interesting amalgamation of dance, lights and music, and moved the audience to tears." Conan Mendoza, the art critic from Deccan Chronicle was laudatory of Savitha’s attempts at changing the traditional nature of Bharatanatyam, and wrote " She is like a breath of fresh air in a circuit that focuses predominantly on adherence. She is no rebel, but charts her own course."

== Credits ==
- Producer and Writer: AK Srikanth
- Artistic direction and choreography: Savitha Sastry
- Music and lyrics: Rajkumar Bharathi
- Technical direction and lighting: Victor Paulraj, Studio7
- Sound analyst: Sai Shravanam, Resound India
- Costume design: C A Joy, Joy Dressers
- Makeup: Huda Amini, New Delhi
- Design and photographs: Aditya Sastry, Lost Arrows Studio, California
- Narration: Hans Kaushik, Akhila Ramnarayan, Govind Venkatesan, Varun Iyer
- Vocals: Krithika Arvind & Srikanth
- Keyboard: Vijayshankar
- Mrdangam: Vijayaraghavan
- Tabla: Ganapathy
- Veena: Bhavani Prasad
- Sitar and zitar: Kishore
- Flute: Vishnu
- Violin: Embar Kannan; Yensone and group
- Recording studio: Resound India, Chennai

== Dance Film ==
In 2019, Yudh was released as a dance film and made available on a free to view digital format.
