= Rajkumar Bharathi =

Indian classical singer and composer

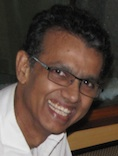

Background information
- Born
- Origin: India
- Genre: Indian classical music
- Occupations: Singer, composer

Rajkumar Bharathi is a classical singer and composer from India. He is the great-grandson of the renaissance poet Subramanya Bharathi. Rajkumar is an Electronics and telecommunications engineer graduated from the College of Engineering, Guindy, Chennai. Rajkumar Bharathi a native of Chennai stands today as one of the most popular artists of his generation. He has also got a great following in the Indian state of Karnataka owing to his pleasing style of rendering Dasara Padagalu.

== Music training ==
Rajkumar Bharathi was introduced to music by his mother Lalitha Bharathi at the age of 5. He was also trained later under the tutelage of classical musicians like Valliyur Gurumurthy, M. Balamuralikrishna and T. V. Gopalakrishnan. For Rajkumar Bharathi it was but natural to be associated with Music owing to his families keen interest in art and literature. By the instructions of his master T. V. Gopalakrishnan, Rajkumar decided to quit his job in an R&D division and devote his time for classical music.

== Performer ==
Rajkumar Bharathi has given Classical Carnatic music concerts throughout India and abroad. He has traveled across USA, Canada, U.K. Gulf countries, Sri Lanka, Singapore, Malaysia, Australia and New Zealand. He has many audio cassettes and CDs to his credit. He has also rendered all the 18 chapters of Srimad Bhagavd Gita, in 4 volumes produced by Ramakrishna Math. He was also a member of the Madras Youth Choir, one of the oldest Indian choral groups formed under the aegis of the late music director M. B. Sreenivasan. He has sung in films – Tamil, Telugu, Kannada, Malayalam, Sanskrit and Tulu and was the leading Indian singer along with Sharon Rose the widely respected Black American singer in the adventurous venture, the Asian Mafia – a daring interplay between Indian and Pop style singers. Rajkumar conducts workshops every summer for the London-based Carnatic music students and has performed Jugalbandi concerts with Ramesh Narayan, Parameshwar Hegde and Sanjeev Abyangar. He has given performance in the prestigious Canadian India Festival to celebrate the Golden Jubilee of Indian Independence, in 1997.

== Musical Excellence ==
Music lovers have admired him for his style of singing with clear diction and enunciation of lyrics (Sahithya Bhava). Rajkumar Bharathi's sound knowledge, imagination, and aesthetic presentation are sought after by many composers. He is also appreciated for his skill in understanding phrasing (the way the elements of a particular work are interrelated including articulation, melodic construction, and links), harmony (scales, intervals, and chords), and variation (melodic and rhythmic) while composing tunes for dance. He is also known for his creative explorations and improvisations as every composition of his is believed to be distinctive from the other.

== Awards ==
Rajkumar Bharathi has been honored by several Awards. A few of them are listed below.

- Outstanding Young Person Award by the Rotary Club of South Madras.
- Sangeetha Gana Sudha Nidhi by Thyagaraja Samithi, Anantapur.
- Sangeetha Sudhakara by Sri Sringeri Sankaracharya, Sringeri Math.
- Asthana Vidwan of Shri Datta Peetham, Mysore and Sri Sringeri Math, Sringeri.
- Gana Kala Bharathi by Hindu American Temple and Cultural Centre, NJ, USA.
- Outstanding Young Musician Award by Maharajapuram Viswanatha Iyer trust, Madras.
- Kalki Award for Young Musician by the Kalki Magazine, Madras.
- Central Excise Award for Young Achiever by the Central Excise Department, Government of India.
- Sahitya Priya Award by Jankalyan Trust, Madras.
- TTK Award – TTK Award
- Kalaimamani Award - 2018

In 1950, the Music Academy instituted the Certificate of Merit, given to senior musicians who had made a mark in the field as icons and gurus. This in the 1980s was named the TTK Award in memory of TT Krishnamachari, former Union Minister and industrialist, who was a great patron of the arts and who as Vice-President of the Music Academy did much to make its auditorium a reality. Two senior performing artistes are selected annually for this award.

== Films ==
Rajkumar Bharathi has also sung in Tamil, Telugu, Kannada, Malayalam, Sanskrit and Tulu Films. He however later stopped signing for films for he derived more joy in singing classical music.

Songs	Film	Industry	Director
Nenjil Uramum inri	Ezhavathu Manithan	Tamil	L. Vaidyanathan
Keladaa Manida	Bharathi (film)	Tamil	Ilayaraja
Thanni Eraikkaiyile	Irayilukku Neramachu	Tamil	S A Rajkumar
Chandiranai paartha	Brahmacharigal	Tamil	M. S. Viswanathan
Bharathikku oru kannamma	Sankari	Tamil	V. Kumar
Nilavu Vandhu neeraada	Chiranjeevi	Tamil	M. S. Viswanathan
Pon Veenaiye	Kakitha Odam	Tamil	Shankar Ganesh
Thamarai ilaiye thoodhu sellayo	Thangakalasam	Tamil	M. S. Viswanathan
Mareyalaare	Antharala	Kannada	L. Vaidyanathan
Preethi lokada	Parameshi Prema Prasanga	Kannada	G.K. Venkatesh
Nakka haage natisabeda	Undoo hoda kondoo hoda	Kannada	Vijayanand

== Composer ==
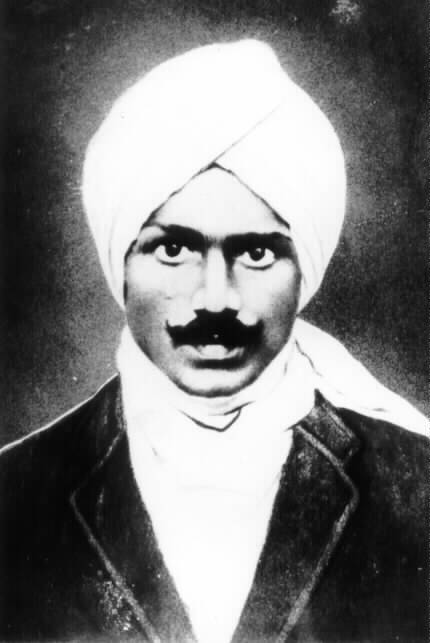
Rajkumar Bharathi has composed tunes for the poems written by his great-grandfather Subramanya Bharathi (pictured)

Rajkumar is also composer and music director and is involved in composing music for Audio CD's, thematic presentations and also for fusion projects. He also has composed many Varnams, Thillanas and Padams especially for dance projects. As the great-grandson of the poet Subramanya Bharathi, Rajkumar Bharathi has tuned many of his great-grandfather's lesser known compositions and presented them in the Classical Carnatic forums.

He has composed the title music and the background music for the tele-serial 'Ramana Oli' depicting the life history of Bhagavan Ramana Maharishi. This was telecast in the Indian TV Channel for about 14 weeks.

=== Music composition for Dance ===
Rajkumar Bharathi has also composed songs for Bharata Natyam Margams. He has done many music compositions for Rangoli productions a foundation for Arts and Culture. Some of his compositions are listed below.

- Anubhava (1994)
- Creation Myth (1995)
- Mustard Seeds (1996)
- Soorya Kanti (1997)
- Sacred Geometry (2002)
- Patanjali (2008)

He has also composed music for dance ballets like

- Angahara Dance Ensemble – LA, USA Panchatantra – Folk tales From Kerala – Based on the compositions of Maharaja Swathi Thirunal.
- Indian Performing Arts, MA, USA Gotha – based on the life of Saint Andal.
- Srishti Dance Company – UK Holy Chakras – Thematic presentation about Shrichakra and the Yantras.
- Vipanchi Dance School, India and Bharatiya Vidya Bhavan, London Kadirkama Kuravanji – Based on the compositions of the late Maha Vidwan Veeramani Iyer of Sri Lanka
- RASA Dance School, India Bharathi Kanda Sakthi – Based on Bharathi's songs, Goddess Sakthi, Ramana Maharishi.
- Vaishnavi Dance Academy – TX, USA Kuttrala Kuravanji – based on Lord Muruga's marriage.
- SruthiLaya – TX, USA Great Kings of India

His musical compositions for Savitha Sastry's dance theatre productions have also met with critical and popular acclaim. These are

- Music Within (2010)
- Soul Cages (2012)
- Yudh (2013)
- The Prophet (2013)
- Chains: Love Stories of Shadows (2015)
- In God's Country (2015)
- The Descent (2019)
- Awakening (2019)
- The Colors Trilogy (2020–21)

He was nominated for the prestigious Lester Horton Dance Award for Outstanding Achievement in Composing Music for Creation Myth, a dance ballet for the UCLA Centre for Performing Arts (University of California, LA, USA) in 1995.
