= The Colors Trilogy =

Indian films

Colors: Green
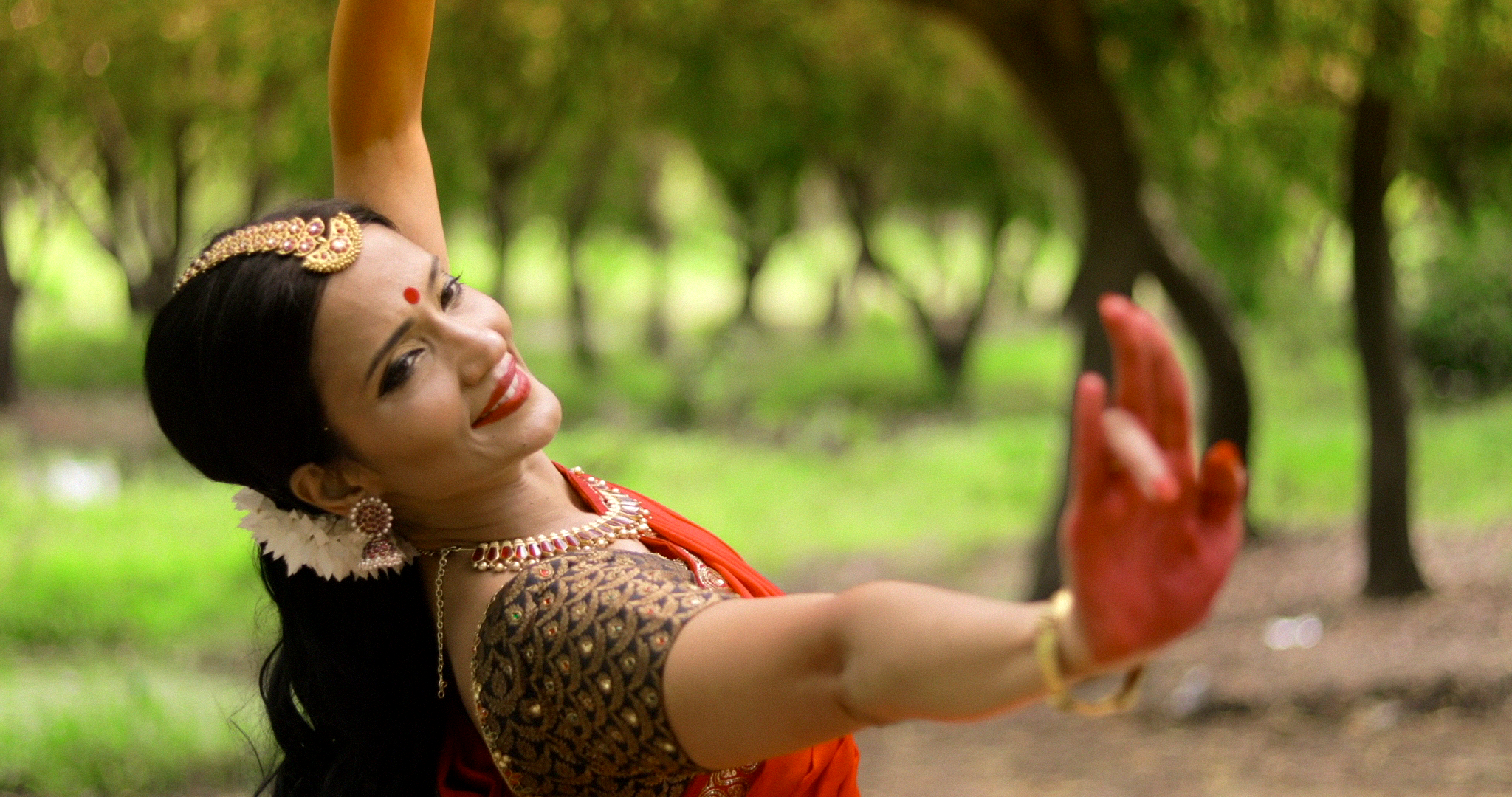
- Savitha Sastry in Colors Green
- Company: The Savitha Sastry Production Company
- Genre: Solo Bharatanatyam Dance Theatre
- Date of premiere: 25 September 2020

Creative team
- Choreographed and Performed by: Savitha Sastry
- Written & Directed by: AK Srikanth
- Music: Rajkumar Bharathi

The Colors Trilogy is a series of short films with themes based on women juxtaposed with the ideologies behind the three colors of the Indian National Flag. The trilogy is delivered through the Indian classical dance form Bharatanatyam. The films Green was released in 2020, and the second and third films White and Saffron were released in 2021.

The films were choreographed and performed by Savitha Sastry. They were written and directed by her husband AK Srikanth. The soundtrack was scored by Rajkumar Bharathi, All three films have won awards in several international film festivals.

== Green ==
Green (2020) was the first release in this series. The colour Green in the flag represents prosperity, and the film examines prosperity in women with relation to their freedom of choice.

The protagonist of the film is portrayed to be in an affluent and seemingly happy family, living with her husband, mother in law and two daughters. However, there are signs of discontent in her as she wishes to pursue her own dreams of being a dancer, while everyone else thinks she is already successful as she has taken up the responsibility of caring for the family and the children.

Critic Ayesha Tabassum of the Indian Express wrote that "The 15-minute film, the first in a trilogy, which explores the role of women, creatively uses Bharatanatyam as a medium. Shilpa SR of the Hindu wrote that the film "delves into the workings of a woman's mind"

The film has also won several nominations across film festivals.

- Won - Best Film on Women: Calcutta International Cult Film Festival
- Won - Best short fiction: 6th International Film Festival of Shimla
- Finalist - Best Director: Tokyo International Short Film Festival
- Finalist - Best Short Film: Seoul International Short Film Festival
- Finalist - Best Short Film: Near Nazareth Festival
- Nominated - Best Short on Female empowerment: New York Tri-State International Film Festival
- Nominated - Best Short Film: Golden Bridge Istanbul Short Film Festival
- Nominated - Best Short Drama: Asians on Film Festival of Shorts
- Nominated - Best Short Drama: Open Window International Film Challenge
- Nominated - Best Short Film: Mediterranean Film Festival Cannes
- Nominated - Best Films up to 20 Mins: 6th Jaipur Film World 2021
- Nominated - Best Short: Festival Angaelica

Colors: White
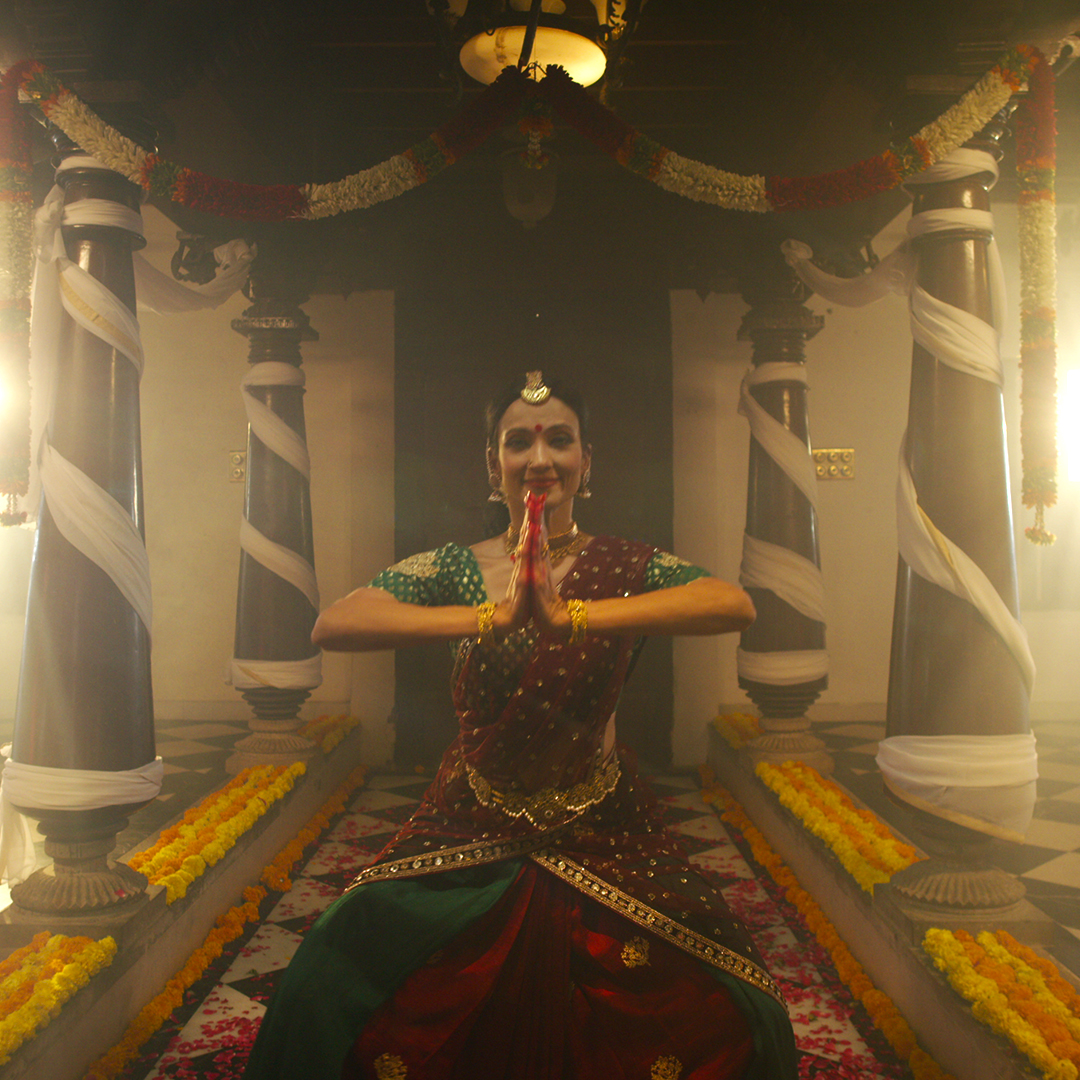
- Savitha Sastry performing Colors: White
- Company: The Savitha Sastry Production Company
- Genre: Solo Bharatanatyam Dance Theatre
- Date of premiere: 30 April 2021

Creative team
- Choreographed and Performed by: Savitha Sastry
- Written & Directed by: AK Srikanth
- Music: Rajkumar Bharathi

== White ==
"White" (2021) is the second film in the trilogy. White in the flag represents truth and peace. This film is an artistic autobiography of Savitha Sastry and follows her journey from being a traditional Bharatanatyam dancer, to one who uses the dance form to narrate novel stories.

Critic Ayesha Singh of the Indian Express wrote that Savitha "finds herself at the top of the virtual game". Critic Manvi Pant of eShe goes on to say "Bharatanatyam dancer and choreographer Savitha Sastry's experiments with traditional dancing techniques and her innovations in the field have been widely recognised by critics and peers alike. Known for pushing boundaries, Savitha is a pioneer in taking the dance out of its mythological and religious moulds, and using it to narrate novel stories". Critic Roshni Chakraborthy of India Today said "The now-renowned dancer is breaking the mythology and devotion-based art form of Bharatanatyam out of its box and widening its scope with breath-taking stories that capture the audience". Critic Monika Monalisa of the "Indian Express" praised Savitha's performance with the words "The world celebrates International Dance Day on April 29, but for city-based Bharatanatyam dancer Savitha Sastry, every day is a celebration of this art form. Sastry is riding the wave of success of her film Colors: White"

The film has gone on to receive nominations at multiple film festivals.

- Won - Best Director, Short: New York International Film Awards
- Won - Best Director: Rosarito International Film Festival, Mexico
- Finalist - Best Director: New Wave Short Film Festival, Munich
- Finalist - Best International Narrative Short: Toronto Independent Film Festival of Cift
- Finalist - Best Short Film: L'Âge d'or International Arthouse Film Festival, Kolkata
- Nominated - Best Director: Paris Film Festival
- Nominated - Best Short Film: Lift-Off Online Sessions, UK
- Nominated - Best Dance Film: Paris Play Film Festival

Colors: Saffron
- Company: The Savitha Sastry Production Company
- Genre: Solo Bharatanatyam Dance Theatre
- Date of premiere: 28 August 2021

Creative team
- Choreographed and Performed by: Savitha Sastry
- Written & Directed by: AK Srikanth
- Music: Abhay Nayampally

== Saffron ==
"Saffron" (2021) is the third and concluding film in the trilogy. Saffron in the Indian National Flag represents courage. This film follows the protagonist in a dystopian future where women deemed more successful than men are placed in a 'cell' with their memories erased, for the rest of their natural lives.

The short film was highly lauded for its intense delivery. The Mumbai-based daily DNA called it "a befitting tribute to the strength & courage of a woman as the color ‘Saffron’ in the Indian Flag is a symbol of Strength and Courage" in its edition of September 8, 2021, and went on to praise Savitha Sastry's portrayal "The eyecatcher of the short film is Savitha Sastry. She has beautifully portrayed her role and is winning a lot of applause for her brilliant performance." Writer and Director AK Srikanth was lauded for the script, with Business Standard reporting "Writer AK Srikanth's story, while here as a short film, comes to life as it was written. And it is that much richer as an experience for all."

The film has also won nominations in several festivals, including

- Finalist - Best Drama - Lake Placid Film Festival 2021
- Won - Best Music (Abhay Nayampally) - 10th Delhi Shorts International Film Festival-21
- Won - Best Director - Calcutta International Cult Film Festival
- Nominated - Best Short - 7th Art Festival of Miami
- Nominated - Best Short Indian Film - Ayodhya Film Festival
