= Sai Shravanam =

Indian sound engineer, composer and producer

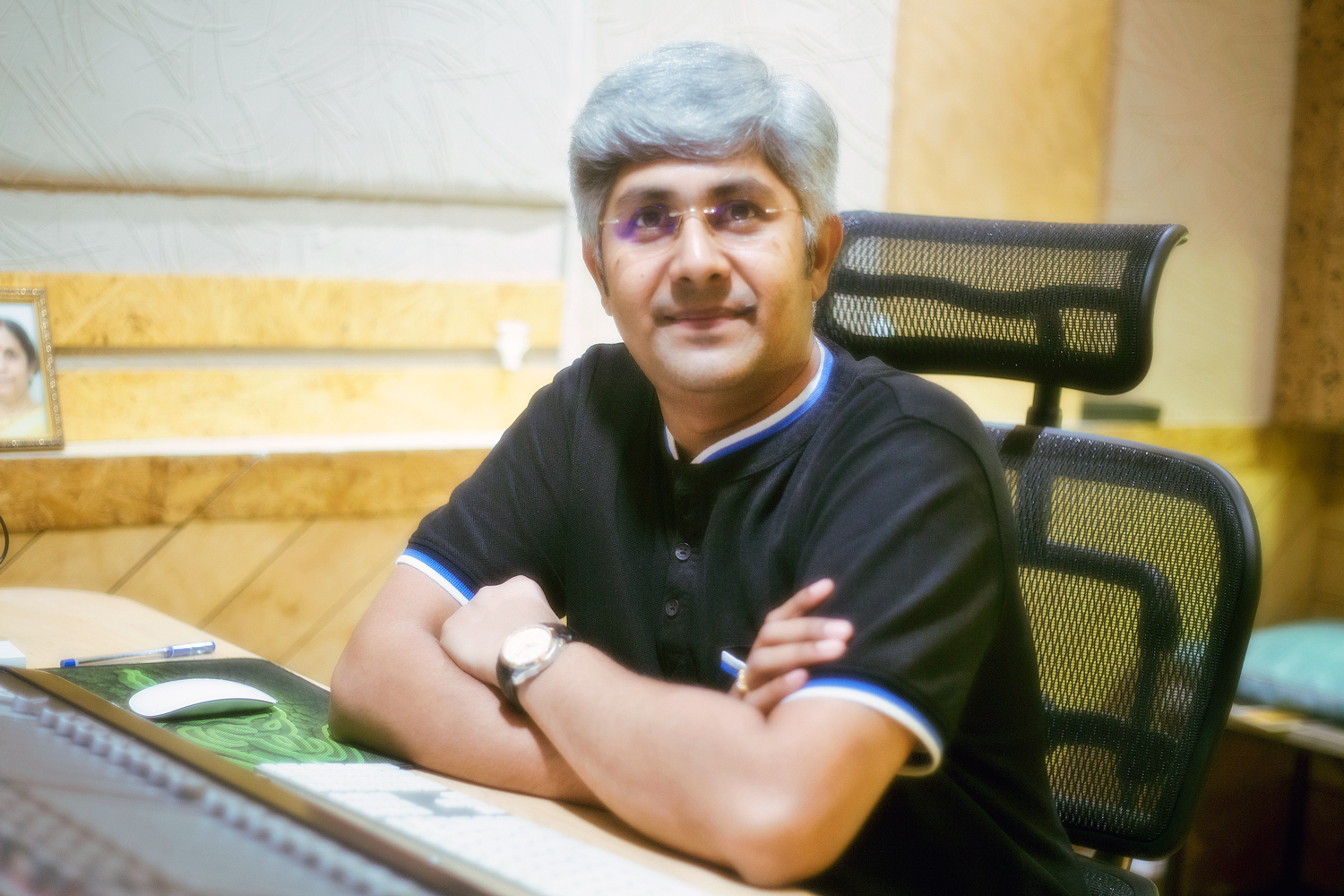
- Sai Shravanam
- Born: 25 June 1981 (age 45); Chennai, Tamil Nadu, India
- Occupations: Record producer, audio engineer, musician
- Website: saishravanam.com

Sai Shravanam is an Indian music producer, recording and scoring engineer. He is a self trained tabla player and one of the few classically trained sound engineers in the country. He is the owner and founder of Resound India in the city of Chennai.

== Early career ==
Sai Shravanam was a child music prodigy and devotee of Sathya Sai Baba. He demonstrated musical abilities from age six. While watching a TV commercial for tea featuring tabla virtuoso Ustad Zakir Hussain, Sai Shravanam was deeply influenced by the music, leading his parents to buy him his first tabla set. Four years later, Shravanam was noticed by maestro Zakir Hussain. He received early percussion lessons from Hussain and his brother, Fazal Quereshi.

The Times of India has recognized him as a rare engineer who has focused his career on recording, archiving, and producing classical Indian music. Since 2004, Sai has been actively involved as a musician, sound engineer, and producer for a variety of film projects, classical music albums, documentary films, and dance theater productions. In the Indian film industry, Sai has collaborated extensively with composer A.R. Rahman.

== Main works ==
- His debut commercial album as a musician, music director, and music producer, "Confluence of Elements," was released in 2007, with vocals by Bombay Jayashri.
- In 2012, he was a Sound Recordist/Additional Engineer for the Academy Award-winning film Life of Pi by 20th Century Fox, directed by Ang Lee.
- In 2015, in the film The Man Who Knew Infinity directed by Matthew Brown, Sai Shravanam was credited uniquely as an Indian Music Producer, arranger, Musician, and Sound Recordist.
- Sai Shravanam is credited for music production and sound design in the dance theatre production Thari - the Loom. The 75-minute program is about the use of thread in the Bharatanatyam dance form. Sai Shravanam recorded the sounds of silk and cotton looms in Kanchipuram, India, and used these recordings and the rhythmic patterns of the weavers in his soundtrack. The soundtrack was also influenced by the classical Indian dance, Bharatanatyam.

== Awards ==
- 1996 – Ugadi Puraskar Awards- Child prodigy For Tabla
- 2017 – Sangeet Natak Akademi Award Yuva Puraskar – Music for Dance
- 2021- Kalaimamani award by TamilNadu Government.

== Discography ==
- Tamasha, the soundtrack album, composed by A. R. Rahman
- As sound analyst in Chains: Love Stories of Shadows the soundtrack album, composed by A. R. Rahman.
- Lingaa (soundtrack)
- Confluence of elements album composed and produced by Sai Shravanam sung by Bombay Jayashri
- Kaaviya Thalaivan (soundtrack)
- As Sound Analyst in Yudh: Three perspectives, one truth.
- Sai has worked on the movie Kabali, music by Santhosh Narayanan
- Mixed and Mastered Music of Server Sundaram, music by Santhosh Narayanan
- Worked in Mersal, music by A. R. Rahman
- Worked in Kaala, music by Santhosh Narayanan
- Worked in Bigil, music by A. R. Rahman
- Mixed and mastered the single Enjoy Enjaami by Dhee, featuring Arivu and produced by Santhosh Narayanan
- Worked in Chhaava, (2025), music by A. R. Rahman
