= Soul Cages: The Story of Life, Death and Beyond =

Soul Cages
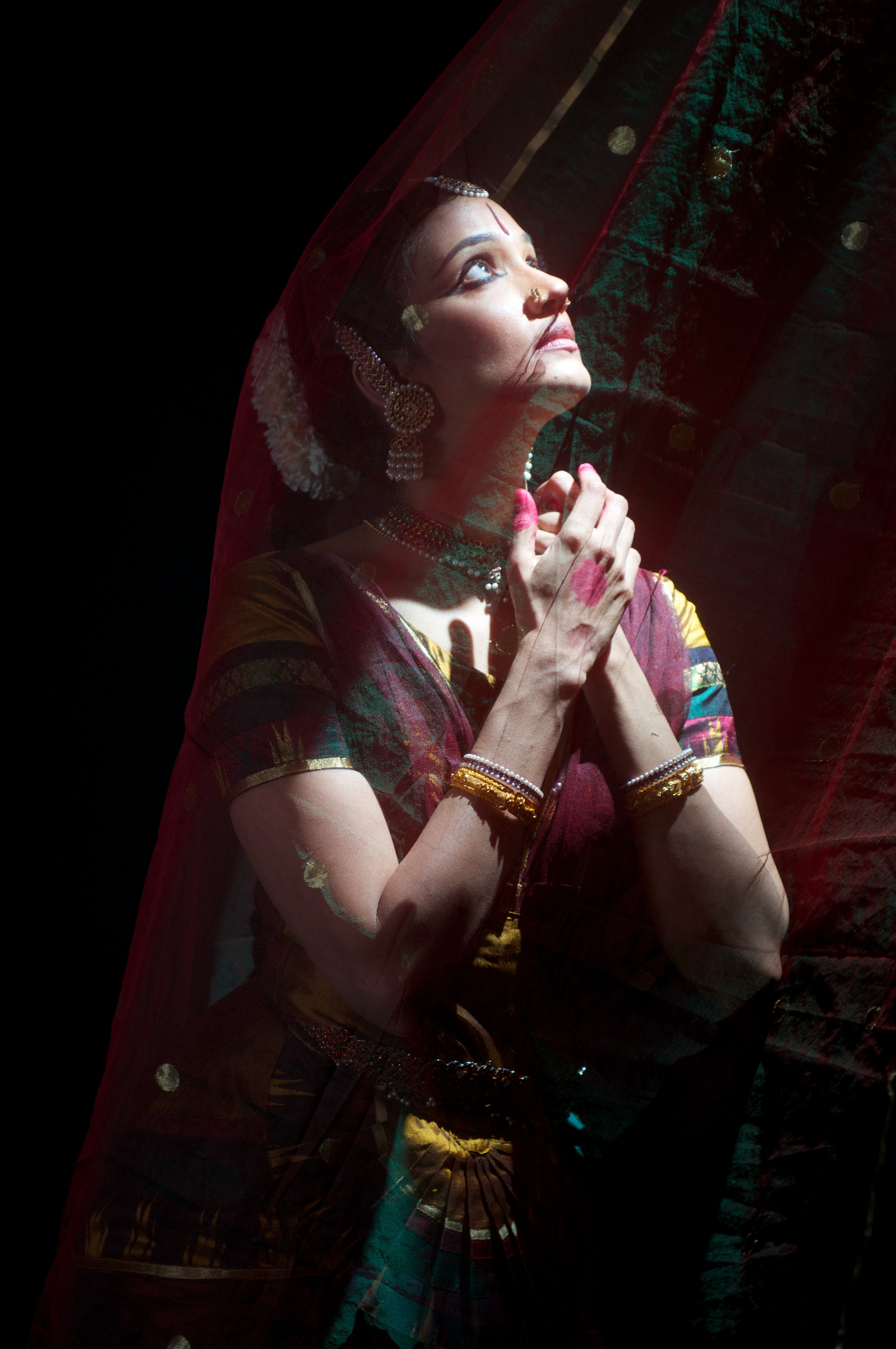
- The Story of Life, Death & Beyond
- Company: Sai Shree Arts
- Genre: Solo Bharatanatyam Dance Theatre
- Date of premiere: 28 Jan 2012

Creative team
- Producer & Writer: AK Srikanth
- Direction & Choreography: Savitha Sastry
- Music: Rajkumar Bharathi
- Technical Direction: Victor Paul Raj
- Costumes: Joy Antony

Soul Cages is a solo Bharatanatyam Dance Theatre production choreographed and performed by Savitha Sastry. It is based on a short story of the same name by AK Srikanth, and featured music by the Chennai-based music composer Rajkumar Bharathi, the great grandson of the veteran poet Subramania Bharathi . The production premiered on 28 January 2012 at New Delhi’s Kamani Auditorium, and has since played in over 20 cities. The presentation was received with critical and popular acclaim.

== Plot ==
Soul Cages follows the journey of a six-year-old child, who dies in her sleep and is taken to heaven by an angel. In heaven, the child encounters the enigmatic King of Death, who is amused by the child’s delight in seeing the wonders of heaven, and engages with the child by playing with her. However, the tone of the story changes at the point where the child realizes that the beauty of heaven holds no meaning to her in the absence of her loved ones. The child figures out a way of having her mother and sister join her in heaven. While the child is delighted to have them close to her again, the King of Death is left in great consternation at the fact that two lives ended on Earth before their time. The presentation follows his attempts to stop the child from bringing more of her loved ones to heaven. The dance drama ends on a bitter-sweet note on the omnipotence of the natural laws of life and death.

== Cast ==
All characters were played by Savitha Sastry, with voice-overs for each character played over the soundtrack in English.

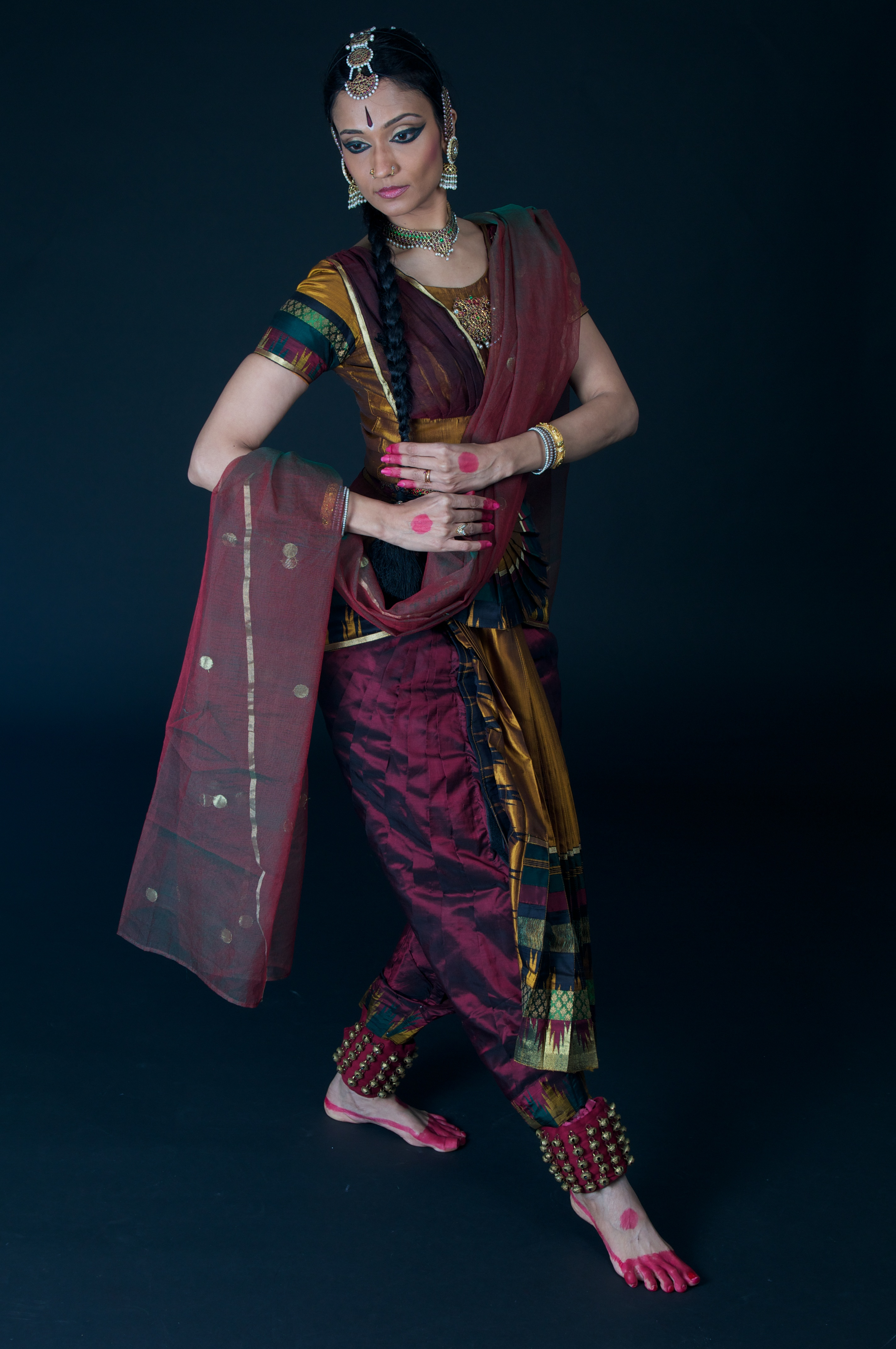
Savitha Sastry performs her dance theater production 'Soul Cages: The story of life, death & beyond' (2012)

== Production ==
Soul Cages marked a departure from traditional Bharatanatyam themes of the nayika (the heroine) pining for love or pieces based on Bhakti (Devotion) alone. While the dance itself was based on Bharatanatyam, the production used several effects from theater such as special lighting, use of voiceovers and narratives in the soundtrack, and the use of an original story not based out of Indian mythology or religion.

== Critical reception ==
Soul Cages received largely positive reviews from critics. In particular, the attempt to bring Bharatanatyam to a wider audience was well appreciated. At The Hindu, critic Shilpa Sebastian noted "Savitha Sastry’s choreography in Soul Cages strips the traditional Bharatanatyam performance of lyrics, to keep a universal appeal". Noted Dance Critic Satish Suri of Narthaki described Soul Cages as "a unique presentation exploring the dichotomy of life and death structured on the imagery and narrative of a story told with the grace and fluidity of classical Bharatanatyam." Ayesha Singh of the Indian Express called it "a renaissance in Bharatanatyam". SD Sharma of Hindustan Times noted, "The magnificence and splendour of Bharatanatyam was brought alive". He further added that the production was "a treat to watch for its innovative trends...a captivating, cohesive dance bonanza". Savitha’s performance was also critically lauded. Critic Tapati Chowdurie of The Statesman said "her aramandis are enviable and her movement on stage fluid poetry.". Critic and writer Pramita Bose of the Asian Age credits Savitha in her review with the words "renders this solo act with much sophistication and finesse to enthral the astute audience and a horde of avid lovers of dance. A critical appraisal of such a unique and spectacular performance reads that while a clout of discerning connoisseurs of the artform will be bewitched by the subtle nuances employed in Sastry’s presentation, the uninitiated novice will but madly fall in love with the art by merely watching it."

== Credits ==
A Sai Shree Arts Production

Artistic Direction: Savitha Sastry & AK Srikanth

Story and Script: AK Srikanth

Music: Rajkumar Bharathi

Lyrics: Niranjan Bharathi

Dance Choreography: Renjith Babu Choorakad & Savitha Sastry

Narration: Prasiddha RamaRao & Govind

Technical Director and Lightings: Victor Paulraj

Costume design: C A Joy

Vocals: Krithika Arvind & Srikanth

Keyboard: Vijayshankar

Mrdangam: Vijayaraghavan

Tabla and other percussion: Ganesh Rao

Veena: Subramanya Sharma

Sitar: Kishore
