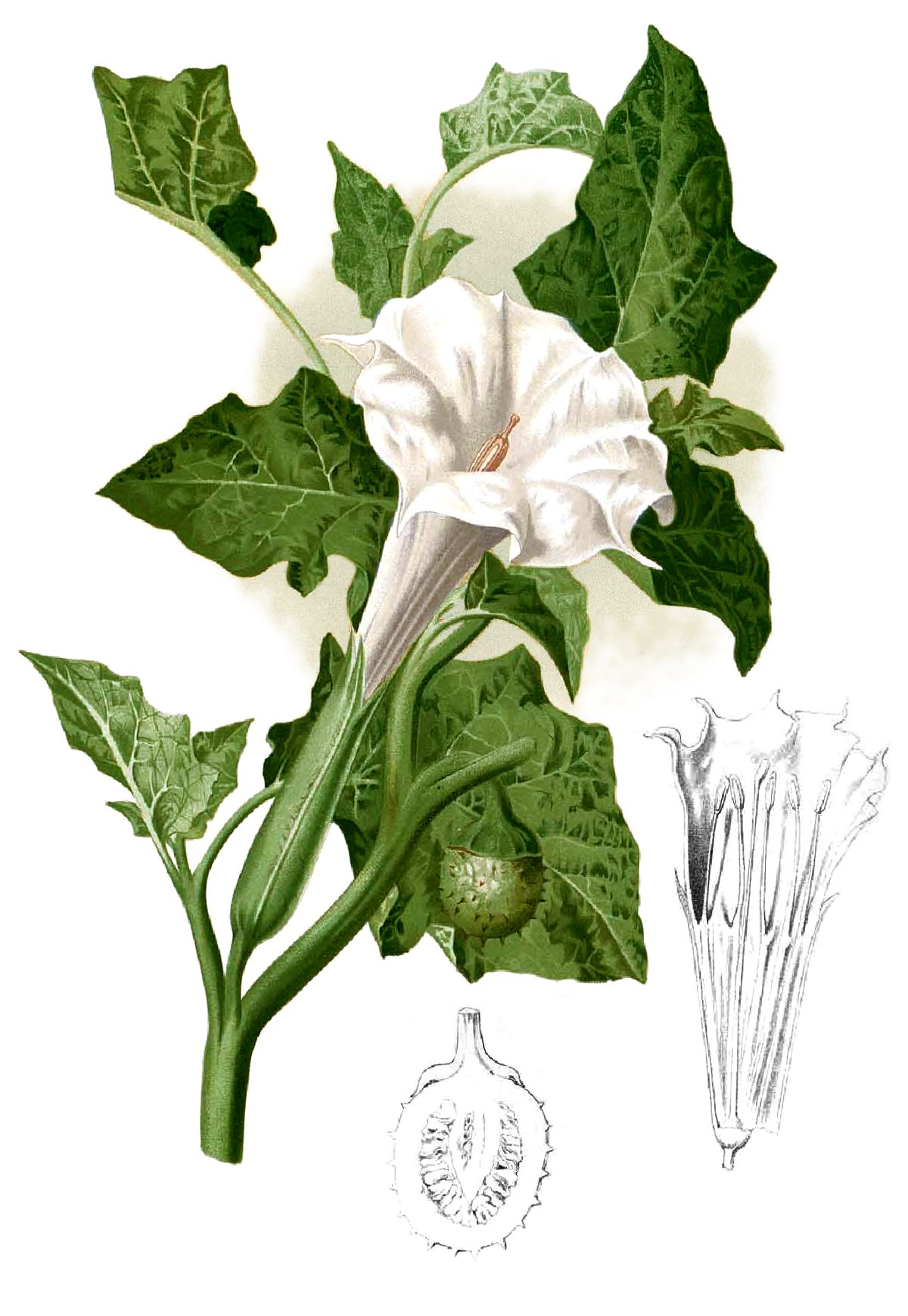

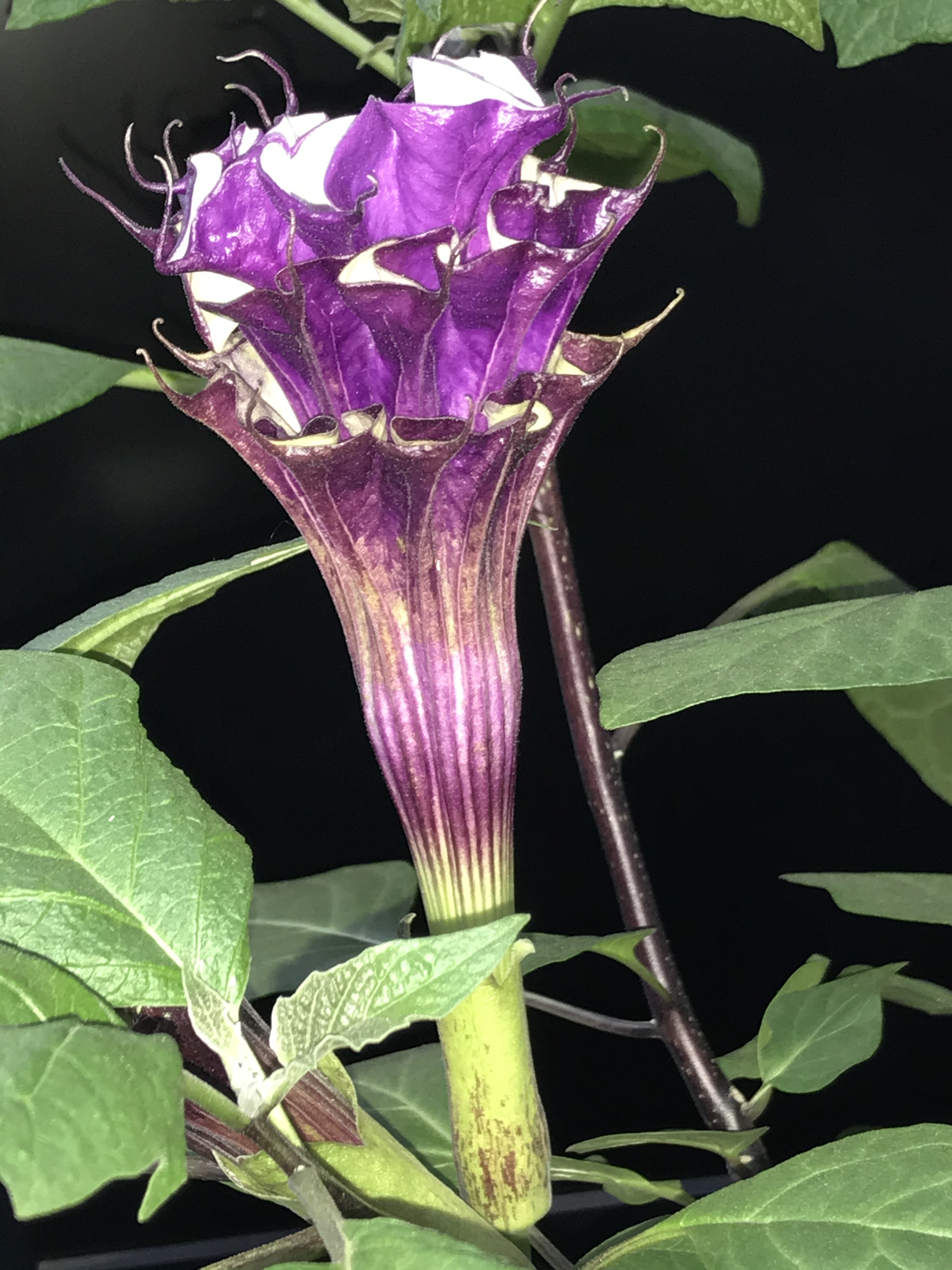
- Datura metel 'Fastuosa'

Scientific classification
- Kingdom: Plantae
- Clade: Tracheophytes
- Clade: Angiosperms
- Clade: Eudicots
- Clade: Asterids
- Order: Solanales
- Family: Solanaceae
- Genus: Datura
- Species: D. metel

Binomial name
- Datura metel L.

Synonyms
- Datura alba Rumph. ex Nees; Datura metel var. fastuosa (L.) Saff.

= Datura metel =

Species of flowering plant

Datura metel is a shrub-like annual (zone 5–7) or short-lived, shrubby perennial (zone 8–10), commonly known in Europe as Indian thornapple, Hindu datura, or metel and in the United States as devil's trumpet or angel's trumpet. Datura metel is naturalised in all the warmer countries of the world. It is found notably in India, where it is known by the ancient, Sanskrit-derived, Hindi name dhatūra (धतूरा), from which the genus name Datura is derived.

The plant is cultivated worldwide, both as an ornamental and for its medicinal properties, the latter being due to its tropane alkaloid content. Like its hardier and smaller-flowered relative Datura stramonium, it is now of widespread occurrence, although showing a preference for warmer, humid climates.

== Description ==
The plant is an annual or short-lived shrubby perennial herb. The roots are a branched tap root, and are not fleshy like roots found in perennial species such as Datura innoxia and Datura wrightii. The species can grow up to 6 ft (1.8 m) high. The stems are hollow, green or purple-black, somewhat woody, and have a strong odour. It is slightly pubescent, with green to dark violet shoots and oval to broad oval leaves that are often dark violet as well. The leaves are simple, alternate, petiolate, and exhibit entire or deeply lobed margins.

The pleasantly-scented 6–8 in (15–20 cm) flowers are immensely varied, and can be single or double. Corolla colour can range from white to cream, yellow, red, and violet. The seed capsule is covered with numerous conical warts or short, sparse spines. The fruits break up irregularly at maturity by not dehiscing in four equal valves like those of other Datura species. Seeds are endospermous.

D. metel was first described by Carl Linnaeus in 1753, but few botanically correct illustrations were made until after the New World was settled. The original home of the plant, although long conjectured to have been India, is now known to have been somewhere in the Americas, probably the Greater Antilles. As late as 1992 it was still being claimed that the plant was "...native probably to the mountainous regions of Pakistan or Afghanistan westward..." While there now remains no doubt that the species originated in the New World, evidence is mounting that it was introduced to the Indian subcontinent - whether by human agency or some chance natural event is not known - at a date no later than the 4th century CE. This precedes the first arrival of European explorers in the Americas.

A wild form of D. metel as a distinct species is unknown. The species, as currently described, is essentially a collection of ancient cultivars likely attributable to pre-Columbian horticultural practices.

=== Similarities to D. innoxia ===
D. metel is similar, in its above-ground parts, to D. innoxia, but, while D. metel has almost glabrous leaves and fruits that can be nodding or erect and are warty, rather than spiny; D. innoxia is pilose (softly hairy) all over and has a markedly spiny, nodding fruit with a more prominently frilled and reflexed persistent calyx.

Symon and Haegi noted in 1991 the occurrence on Cuba of an apparently wild plant given the name Datura velutinosa V.R. Fuentes (no longer an accepted species and now listed as a form of D. innoxia), the capsules of which are tuberculate like those of D. metel.

Historically, single-flowered forms of D. metel have frequently been confused with the widely naturalised D. innoxia - from which it differs in its much less pubescent stems and foliage and shorter-spined and less densely-spined capsules. The reason for this confusion was finally discovered through genetic research carried out in 2000, where it was determined that D. metel is a domesticated form of D. inoxia that was originally derived from Central America and southeastern Mexico.

In support of this claim regarding domestication, Cavazos et al. list several pieces of evidence. While the flowers of wild Datura species are usually white or pale, thin in texture, single and short-lived, the flowers of D. metel have several distinctive strong colour forms, are thick in texture, often have double or triple flowers (trumpet-like corollas nested one within the other) and can last for up to a week before withering. Additionally, the seed capsules of wild Datura species are usually clad with sharp spines which protect them from premature predation, while those of D. metel bear short, sparse spines or tubercles. It is also found that regrowth of the perennial wild species sprouts from the top of the thick roots below ground level, while in D. metel such regrowth is sub-shrubby, sprouting from the woody stem base. It is those woody stems that are used in the vegetative propagation of this 'species' in the indigenous horticulture of southern Mexico. In the light of such evidence, it appears highly likely that humans have in the past undertaken selective breeding of the species ancestral to D. metel to produce mutant forms that flower for longer, have colourful corollas of curious shapes, fruits that lack hurtful spines and somewhat shrubby stems that lend themselves readily to the taking of cuttings.

=== Cultivars ===
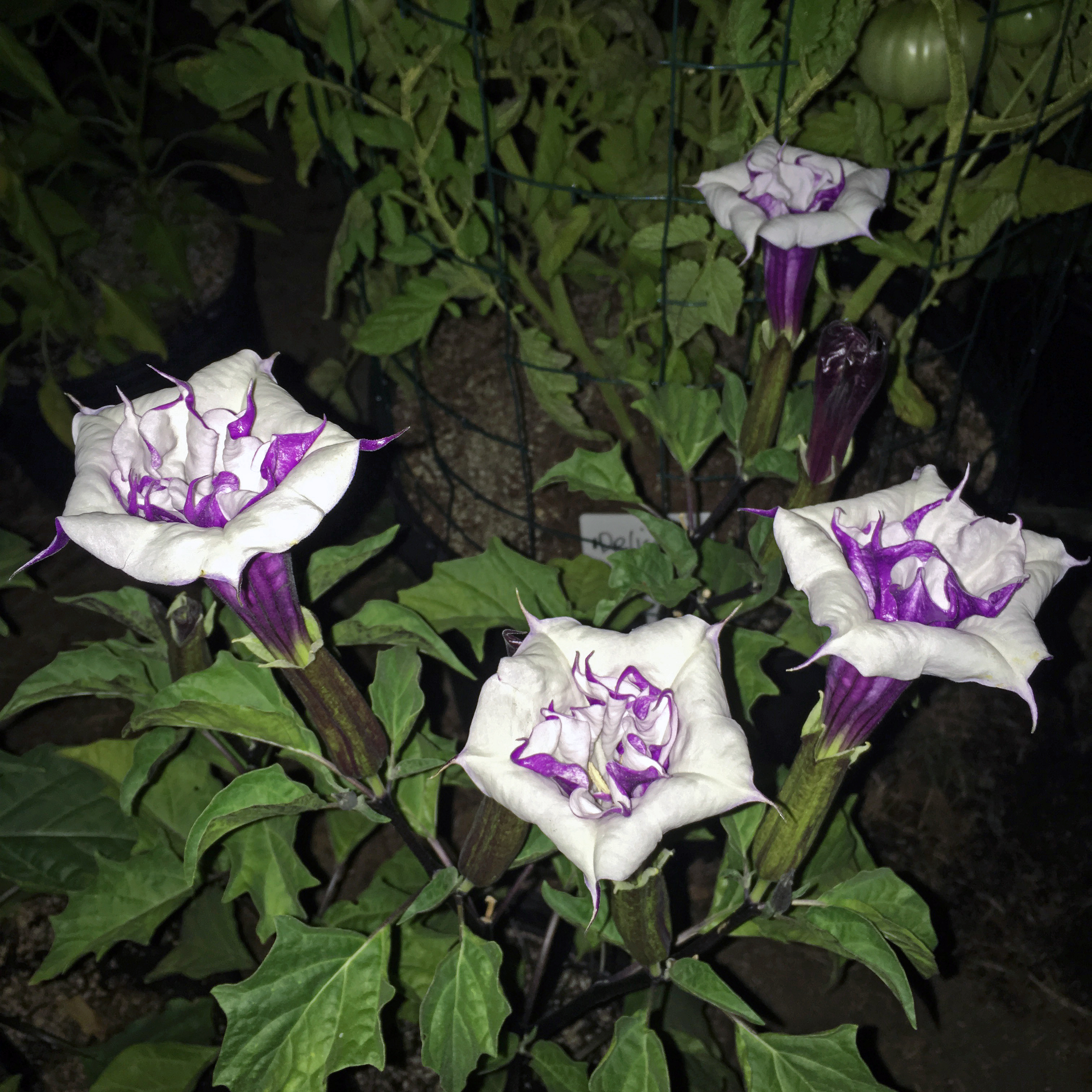
D. metel 'Fastuosa' (flash photograph taken at night).

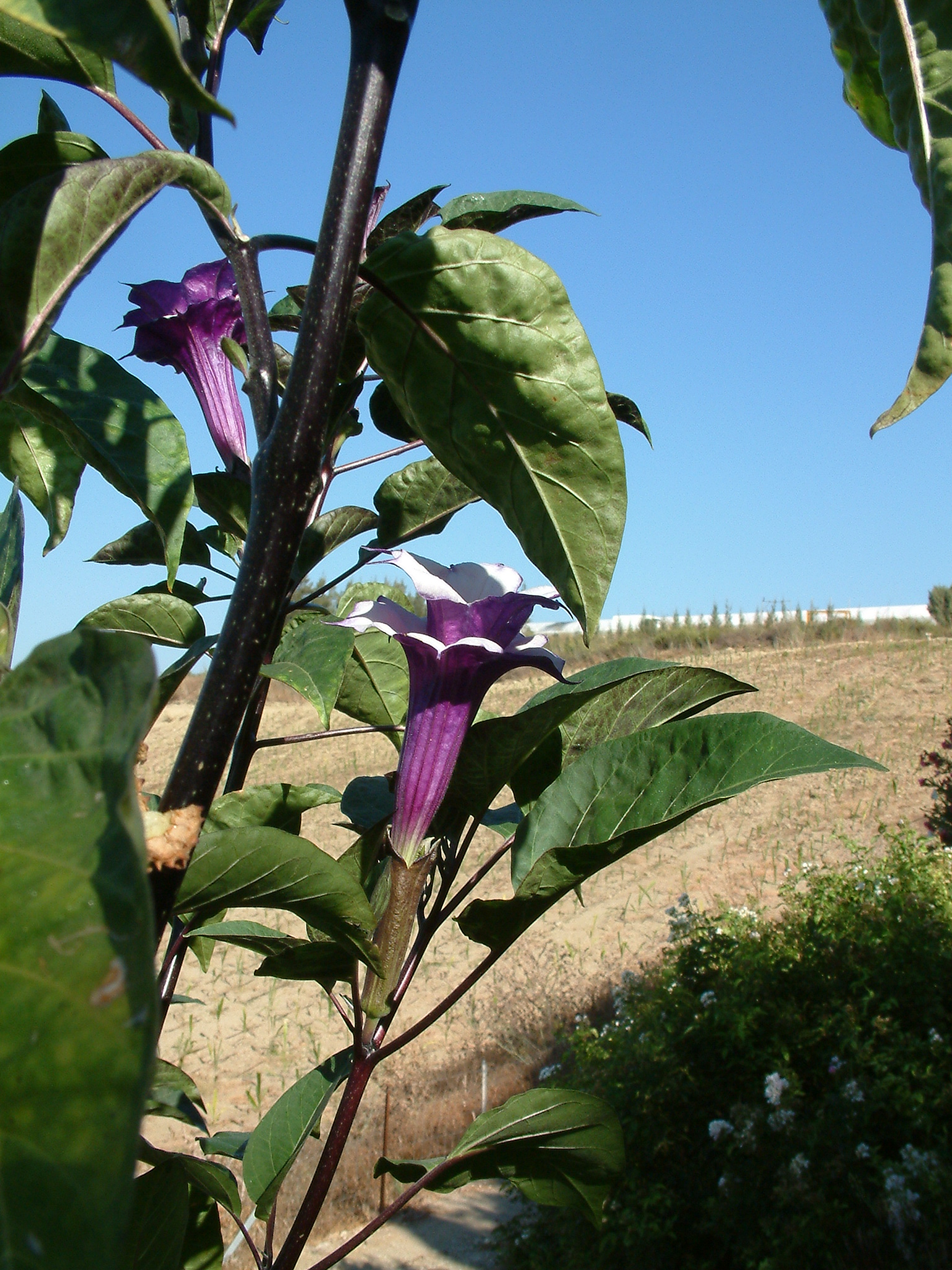
D. metel 'Fastuosa' showing glossy, purple-black stems. Note double (nested) corollas of the type depicted in image of Chola bronze Nataraja in section above.

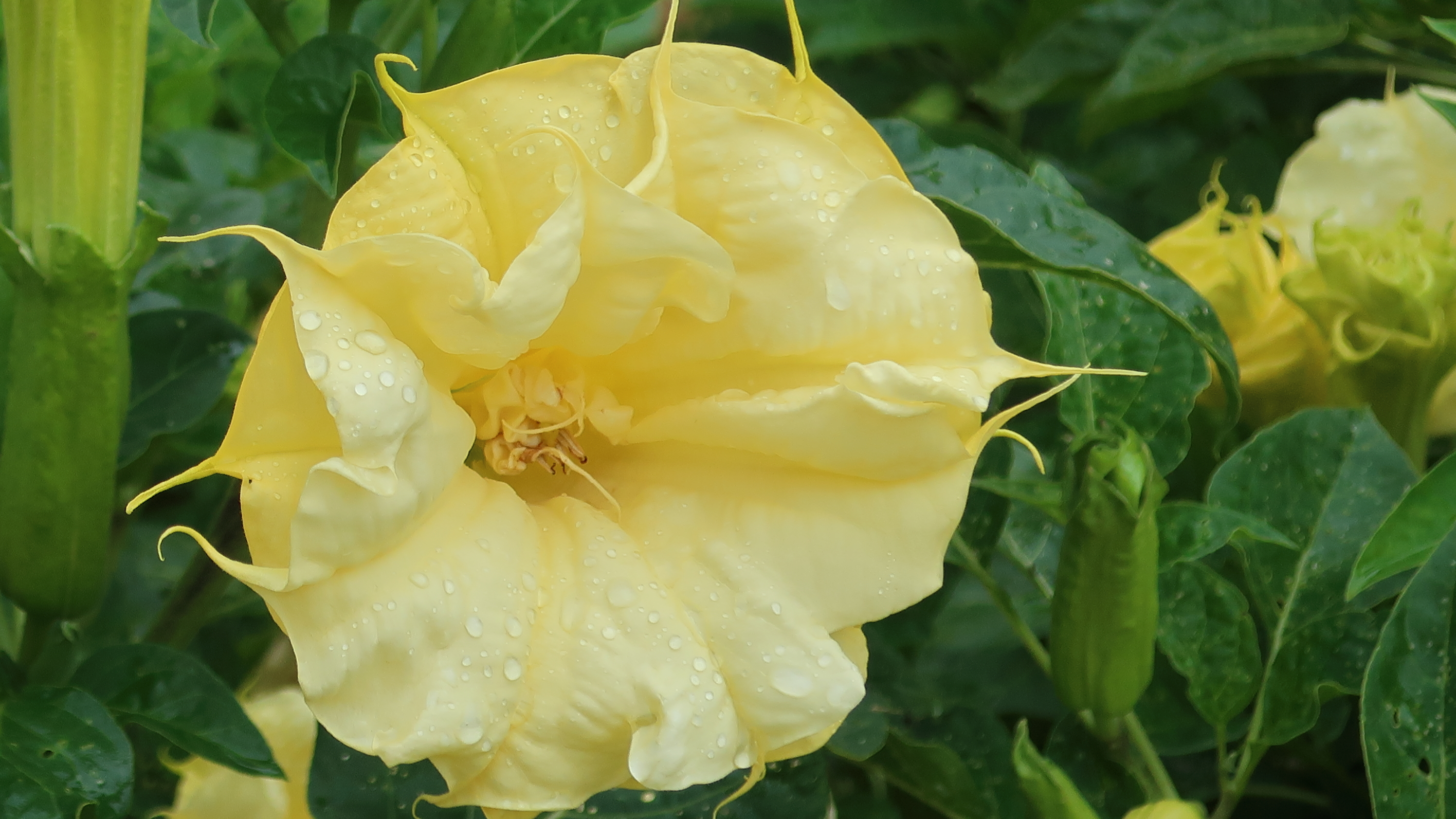
Corolla mouth of a specimen of D. metel 'Chlorantha', Chicago Botanic Garden.

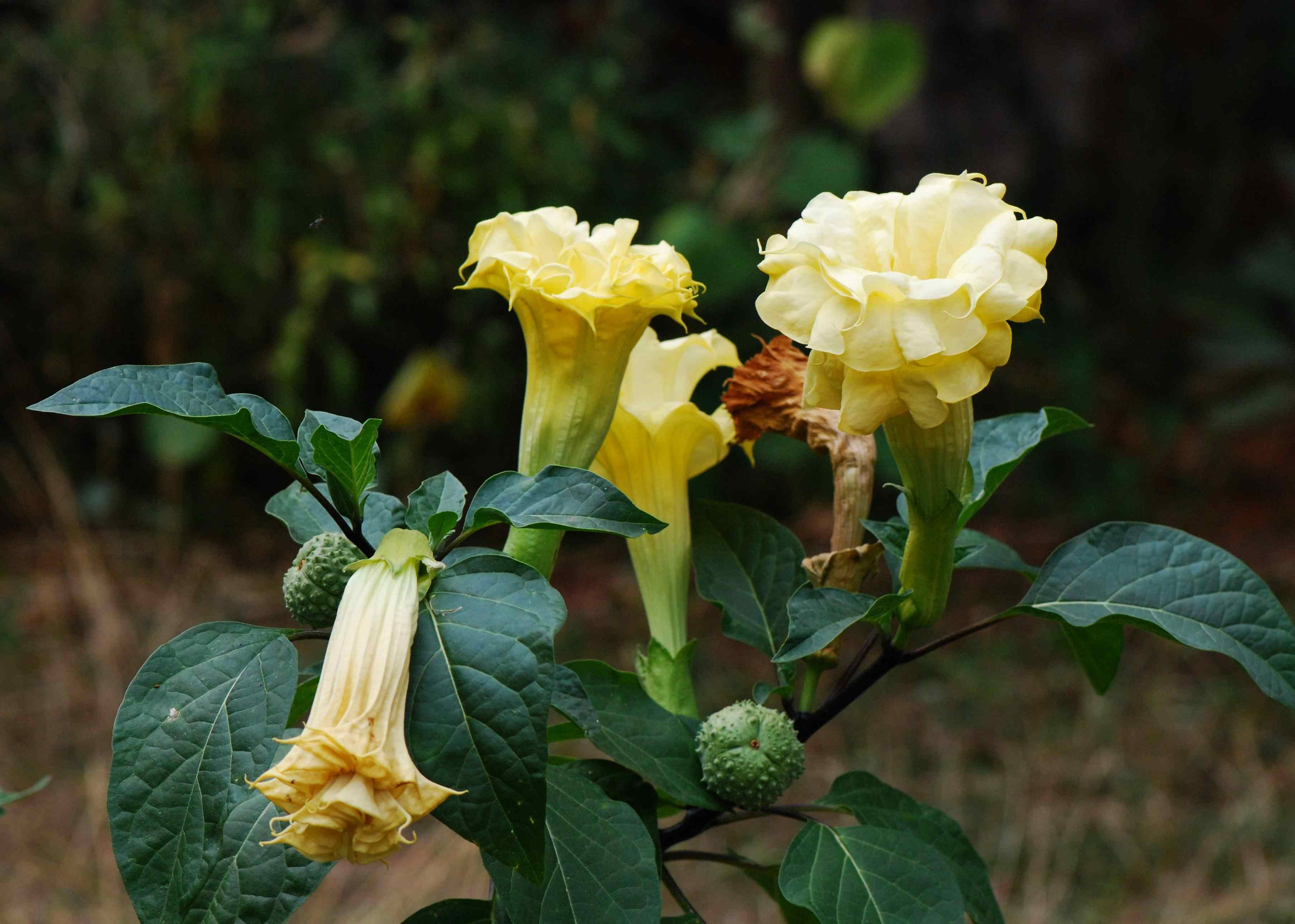
D. metel 'Chlorantha' in flower and fruit. Note curious, apparently three-valved capsules.

...it seems clear that D. metel is essentially a collection of cultivars and recent critical authors have found it impossible to recognise a wild type for the species. This view is supported by the tuberculate capsules found in D. metel (as compared with the spinose capsules of other species) and the retention of seeds on the placenta, at least in cultivars 'Fastuosa' and 'Chlorantha'. Both of these traits suggest cultivar selection...The variants of D. metel have been widely grown as ornamentals over a long period of time...There is no evidence that the variants arose from horticultural plant breeding in the Old World...These facts taken together strongly suggest that D. metel was a well-established cultivated species with a range of forms in its place of origin and that these forms arrived ready-made in Europe.

A cultivar of D. metel with a glossy, purple-black stem (Hindi: काला धतूरा kāla dhatūra - "black datura") has long existed as a garden plant under the obsolete name Datura fastuosa (coined originally by Linnaeus and featuring the Latin epithet fastuosa, meaning "haughty" or "proud"). Its flowers normally have a double or triple corolla, each corolla having a deep purple exterior and white or off-white interior. The same double or triple corolla is also a feature of the yellow-flowered cultivar 'Chlorantha'. The purple-flowered 'Fastuosa' has been reported to have become naturalised in Israel, where it may yet become as common a roadside weed as the related D innoxia.

D. metel 'Fastuosa' has in recent times become known under a variety of superfluous cultivar names such as 'Black', 'Blackcurrant Swirl', 'Cornucopaea', 'Double Blackcurrant Swirl', 'Double Purple', and 'Purple Hindu'. It has also received many scientific names which should not be used for a cultivar:

- Datura hummatu var. fastuosa (L.) Bernh.
- Datura fastuosa L.
- Datura metel f. fastuosa (L.) Danert
- Datura metel var. fastuosa (L.) Saff.
- Stramonium fastuosum (L.) Moench

Likewise the yellow-flowered D. metel 'Chlorantha' has acquired such superfluous cultivar names as 'Ballerina Yellow'.

== Poison ==
All parts of Datura plants contain dangerous levels of highly poisonous tropane alkaloids meteloidine and its angelate ester and datumetine and may be fatal if ingested by humans or other animals, including livestock and pets. In some places, it is prohibited to buy, sell, or cultivate Datura plants.

Datura metel may be toxic if ingested in a tiny quantity, symptomatically expressed as flushed skin, headaches, hallucinations, and possibly convulsions or even a coma. The principal toxic elements are tropane alkaloids. Ingesting even a single leaf can lead to severe side effects.

=== Criminal poison in Thuggee ===
The Thugs, gangs of professional robbers and murderers who wandered the roads of central India, would sometimes use preparations of Datura metel to stupefy the rich merchants whom they favoured as victims, before strangling or stabbing them. The English word thug traces its roots to the Hindi ठग (ṭhag), which means 'swindler' or 'deceiver'. Accounts of the Thugs written by early 19th century colonial authors tend to evoke an orientalist fantasy of a bloodthirsty (quintessentially) Hindu cult offering human sacrifices to the goddess Kali, while modern scholars tend to perceive the reality of Thuggee to have been more a matter of criminal activity undertaken for gain by organised groups of disaffected and recently unemployed soldiers of both Hindu and Muslim faith.

There were also occasional reports, from the earliest times, of gangs [i.e. criminal gangs active long before the advent of Thuggee] who poisoned their victims with Datura, which was commonly used by many Indian highway robbers to stupefy their victims. It seems to have been used [by the Thugs] only intermittently. One Thug described this technique of using the drug as the tool of "mere novices", implying that an experienced strangler should have no need of such an aid to murder.

== Medicinal use ==
Datura metel is one of the 50 fundamental herbs used in traditional Chinese medicine, where it is called yáng jīn huā (洋金花). However, the ingestion of D. metel in any form is dangerous and should be treated with extreme caution. According to Drug & Cosmetic Act 1940 & Rule 1995, Datura metel is banned in India except for use in Ayurvedic medicine. In Aruba, Curaçao, Cuba, and Surinam, Datura metel was used in traditional medicine.

== Entheogen ==
Datura Linnaeus...The important narcotic species of the Old World is Datura metel. Early Sanskrit and Chinese writings report a hallucinogen that has been identified with this species, and it was probably D. metel that the Arabian Avicenna mentioned as a drug called jouz-mathel in the eleventh century...The epithet Datura was taken by Linnaeus from the vernacular name dhatura or dutra in India, where knowledge of the intoxicating effects of the plant go back to prehistory...This species, of which there are several rather distinctive types, is indigenous to Asia but now ranges widely in tropical and subtropical Asia, Africa and America.

Schultes and Hofmann in 1979 in the second edition of The Botany and Chemistry of Hallucinogens were confident in their assertion of an Asiatic origin and history of use in India stretching back to Vedic period for Datura metel. Considering its allegedly recent introduction to the Old World from the New, beginning in the sixteenth century, Datura metel has indeed been integrated with remarkable thoroughness into the religious and magical practices of Asia and Africa as an intoxicant and entheogen.

Schultes and Hofmann later devote much of a chapter in their 1980 work Plants of the Gods on the use of Datura as a hallucinogen to Chinese, Indian and African practices involving the use of Datura metel as diverse as its employment in Taoist magic, in the worship of the Hindu deity Shiva and in the magical rites of the Eritrean Kunama people. They quote the oft-repeated idea that the plant is to be equated with the herb Jouz-mathal (= "metel-nut"), described in the eleventh-century writings of Persian polymath Avicenna (drawing in turn upon the work of Dioscorides), and thus has an Old World pedigree predating Columbus's arrival in the New. It is certainly the case that D. metel is not one of the species mentioned as being used in the ancient Datura cults of the southwestern U.S.A. and Mexico - a result possibly of its lacking the large, tuberous roots of the desert-adapted Datura species. A great deal of work undoubtedly still remains to be done on the unraveling of the early history and folklore of the plant and its wide dissemination in lands far from its place of origin.

=== Controversy over the country of origin ===
German expert on hallucinogenic plants Christian Rätsch asserts an Asiatic origin for Datura metel. Rätsch bases his contention on the research of Hungarian scholar Dr. Bulcsu Siklós, an authority on Vajrayana, the wrathful deity Bhairava and other aspects of Buddhism at London's SOAS. Siklós claims that references to the use of the plant may be found in the Vajra-mahabhairava-tantra (= "diamond-thunderbolt Tantra of the great and terrible one" (i.e. of the wrathful Shiva conceived of as a bodhisattva)), the Vamana Purana, the Garuda Purana, the Matsya Purana, the Amarakosha and the Kama Sutra of Vātsyāyana.

The occurrence of a plant known as da dhu ra is investigated in the pre-11th century Vajra-mahabhairava-tantra, an Indian Buddhist tantric text existent in Tibetan translation. Internal evidence from the texts, and linguistic evidence, identifying da dhu ra as Datura metel is given despite current certainty of the New World origin of the genus Datura.

The Vajra-mahabhairava-tantra deals with the rituals of the wrathful Buffalo-headed deity Vajrabhairava (a manifestation of the Buddhist Bodhisattva Mañjuśrī). Notable amongst these many and varied rituals are a set of five, three from the 2nd chapter and two from the 4th. These all contain references to a plant known in the Tibetan text as da dhu ra.

The argument for an Indian origin for D. metel advanced in Siklós's paper hinges on the identity of the plant da dhu ra and an unbroken continuity of nomenclature for the said plant. To establish his contention as fact, a researcher would have to prove that the plant first designated by the name da dhu ra was indeed D. metel (this necessarily involving, at the very least, a rudimentary description of the plant's anatomy) and that the name da dhu ra was not first applied to an unrelated plant and only later applied to D. metel at a time compatible with its introduction from the Americas by Europeans. None of the five extracts translated by Siklós provide a description of da dhu ra, although some mention its Datura-like effect of causing insanity. Of the extracts, the third ('C') is the most relevant in this context:

Then, if the mantrin wants to drive someone insane, he takes Datura fruit and, mixing it with human flesh and worm-eaten sawdust, offers it in food or drink. He recites the mantra and that person will instantly go insane and then die within seven days.

Siklós does offer a linguistically unbroken pedigree for the Indian word ancestral to Linnaeus's genus name Datura, beginning with the Prakrit form dhattūra, which can date from no later than the eighth century C.E., long before the time of Christopher Columbus. Siklós himself, however, acknowledges the weakness in his theory occasioned by the lack of the most rudimentary description of da dhu ra anywhere in the five extracts that he translates:

A member of the Solanaceae certainly suggests itself as a suitable candidate, but through lack of any physical description of the plant the quoted passages can at best only suggest the identification of da dhu ra as Datura metel on the basis of toxic effects common to other Indian Solanaceae. Nonetheless, the Vajra-mahabhairava-tantra occurrences at least provide a roughly datable (and definitely pre-Columbian) record of the word da dhu ra on the basis of which the linguistic evidence can be investigated.

However, the effect of causing insanity is not restricted to the Solanaceae. Furthermore, text extracts B and E refer to the lighting of fires the fuel of which is "Datura wood". Datura metel is a slightly woody species that would not yield enough wood for a substantial fire.

Siklós's paper approaches the question of origin from a cultural perspective, drawing on detailed knowledge of Tibetan Buddhism and the Sanskrit-derived languages of India, without addressing the botanical issues raised in such detail by Symon and Haegi.

Kew's Plants of the World Online continues to uphold Symon and Haegi's refutation of an Asiatic origin for Datura metel.

As commonly understood in current works, the drug plant genus Datura is very curious biogeographically. Seven to nine species are generally considered native to the southern part of the North American continent and adjacent islands, with five native to Mexico. The two remaining species are reputed to be native to other far-flung parts of the world: D. ferox in China and D. metel in Asia, while one of the American taxa D. leichhardtii is reputedly shared with Australia. A substantial body of circumstantial evidence is brought together to demonstrate that, like the other species, these last three are in fact native only to the Americas, from where they were introduced to the Old World by Europeans at an early date.

William Emboden, an expert on entheogens, voiced concerns similar to those of Siklós over the apparent antiquity of Indian use of Datura metel:

...our lack of knowledge of some of the earliest practices in the Old World, where the plant dates to prehistory...It is equally curious that the customs surrounding the use of Datura in temperate Asia at a very early date parallel those of contemporary native people of the New World.

However, Symon and Haegi point out two pieces of evidence showing that the supposed naturally disjunct distribution of the genus Datura is unnatural. First, the genus supposedly has a wide distribution and yet shows diversification only in the Americas, and second, the Old World species represent not a taxonomic unit in themselves, suggestive of independent evolution after isolation in Asia, but a cross-section of two sections of the genus Datura already present in the Americas: section stramonium (to which D. ferox belongs) and section dutra (to which belong D. metel and D. leichhardtii).

=== Introduction to India and Africa ===
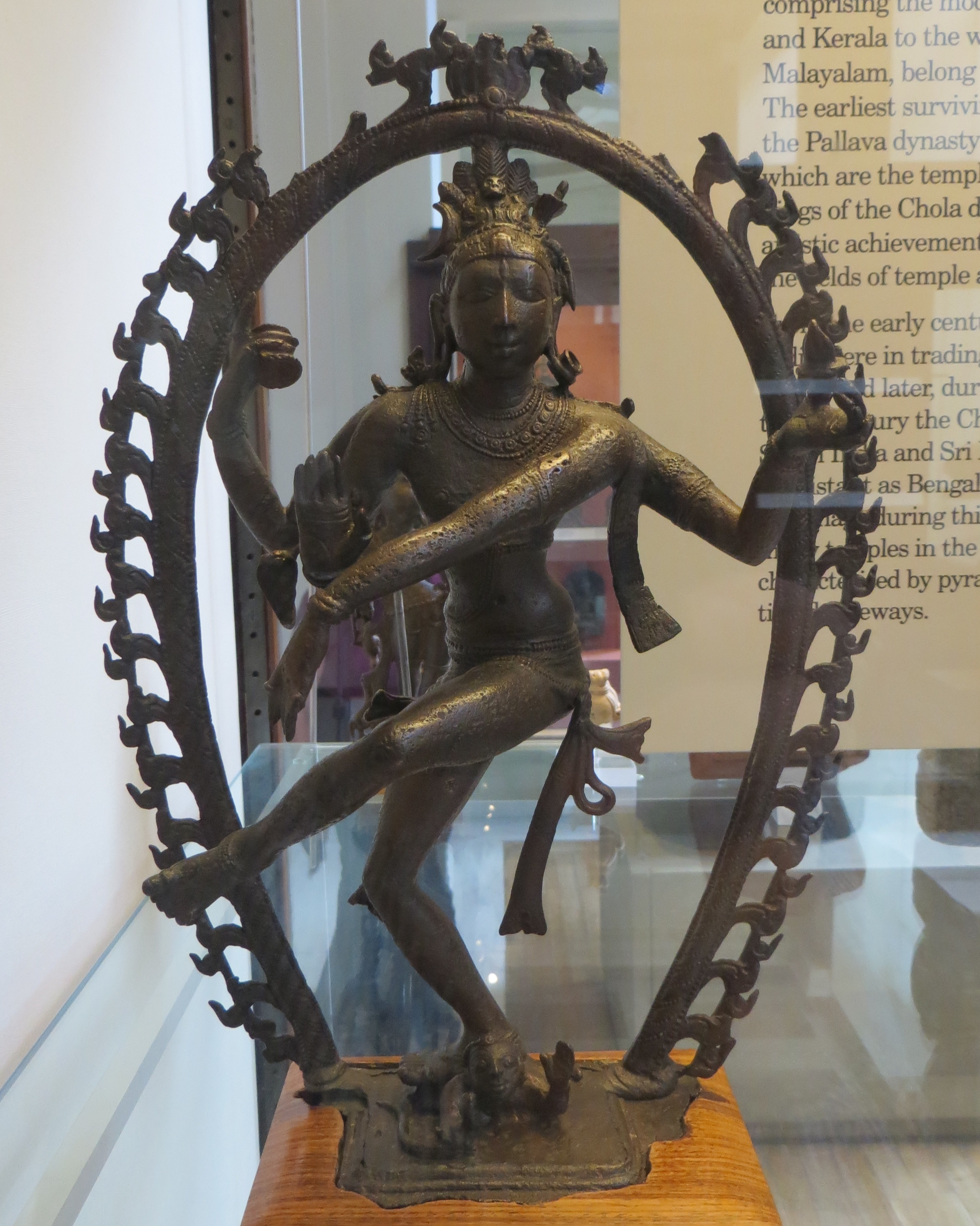
10th century Nataraja sculpture. Note Datura flower (Sanskrit: शिवशखर Shiva-shekhara = "crest/crown/chaplet of Shiva") just visible protruding from right side of headdress.

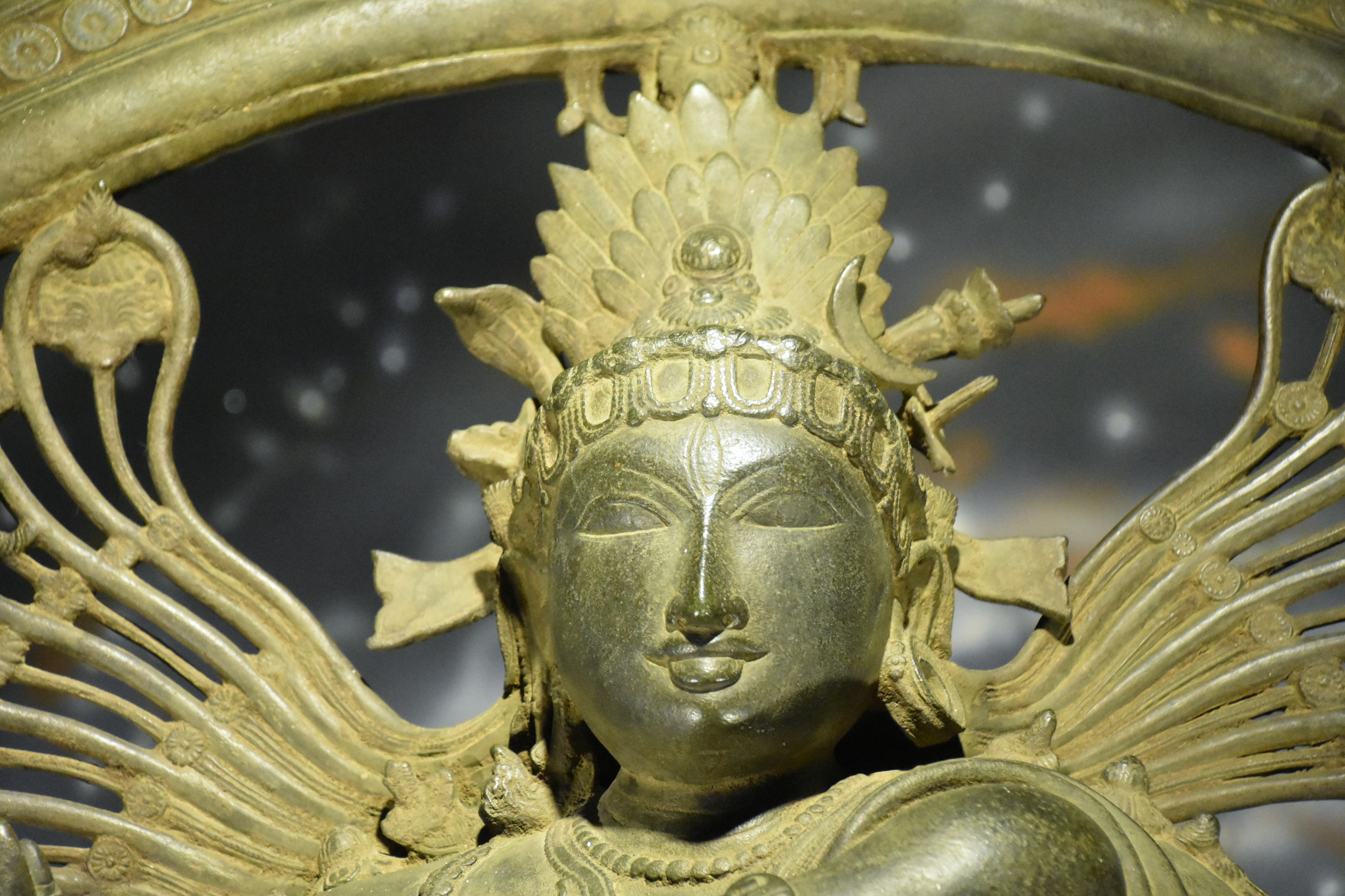
Detail of 11th century chola bronze Nataraja sculpture. Note on the right (above crescent moon): clear depiction of the blossom of a double-flowered form of Datura metel.

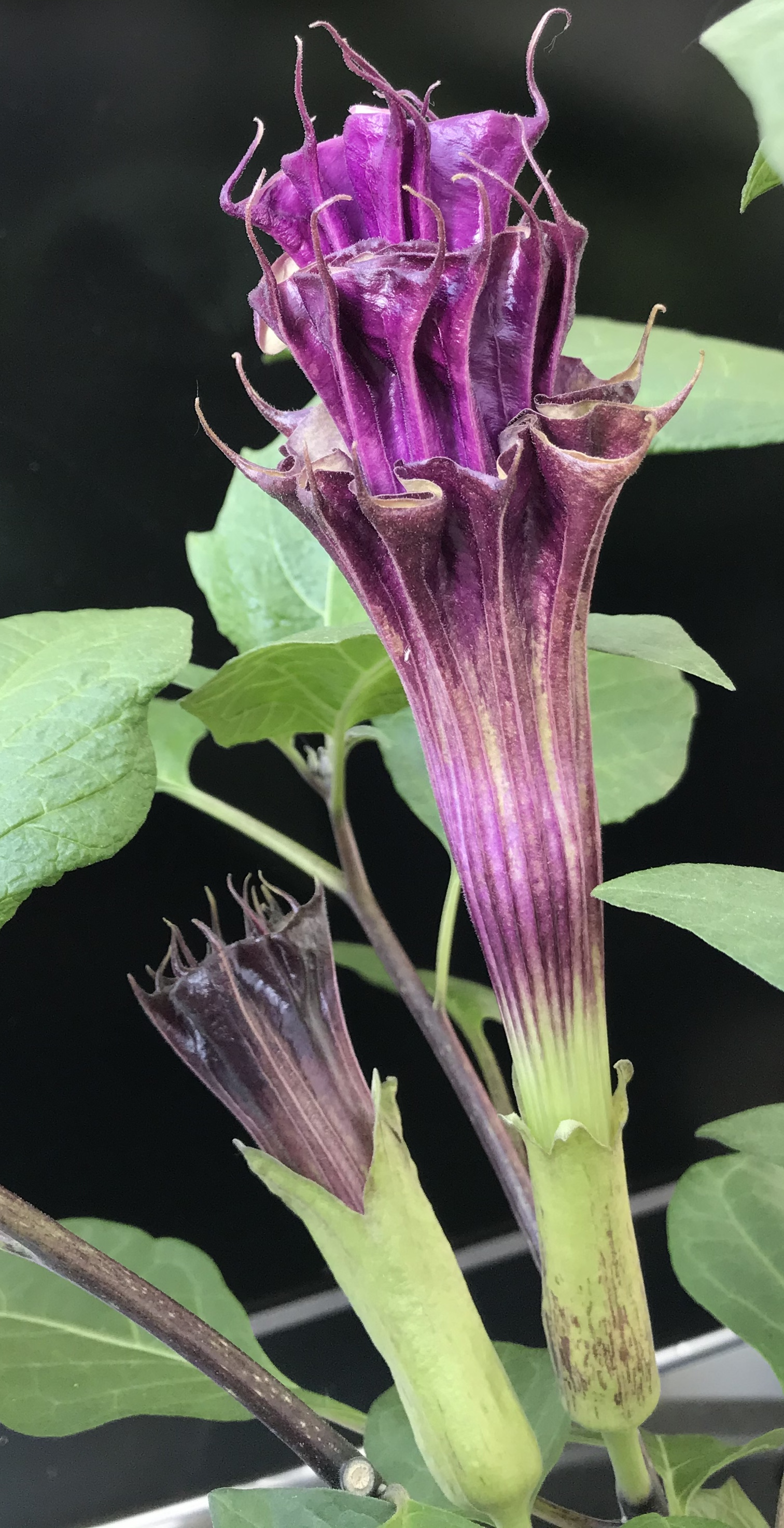
Buds of triple-flowered D. metel 'Fastuosa', one of which at the approximately same stage of development as that portrayed in Chola bronze Nataraja shown above.

The only way of reconciling the religious/ethno-linguistic evidence of Siklós with the botanical perspectives of Symon and Haegi was the positing of a pre-Columbian introduction of Datura metel to India, satisfying the requirement for both a native distribution in the Americas and a cultural presence in India (and probably also Africa) of considerable antiquity. Such a solution that was hypothesized in 2007 in a paper by scholars R. Geeta (Stony Brook University) and Waleed Gharaibeh (Jordan University of Science and Technology), accessing evidence not hitherto available to western botanists (a lack freely acknowledged by Symon and Haegi in their paper of 1991 and noted by Siklós in his critique of their work). Such a hypothesis has seen precedent, the most notable case being that of the sweet potato Ipomoea batatas, for which there is widely accepted evidence for trans-Pacific introductions (both Polynesia-to-South America and vice versa).

Of the possible means of transport by wind, water, bird or human agency, the authors dismiss immediately scenarios involving dispersal by wind or via bird droppings as wholly implausible: the seeds of D. metel are not only heavy but also lack any specialised adaptation to wind dispersal such as a wing or a pappus, and the fruits of Datura are not juicy berries which invite consumption by birds. The authors settle upon transport by water as by far the most likely mode and, of the two scenarios involving water, human-mediated transportation being the more probable, although not ruling out a scenario whereby the buoyant fruits (and seeds possibly remaining viable after prolonged immersion in salt water) of Datura might have been carried to India by ocean currents. Another possibility is that Datura capsules might have been rafted naturally across the ocean on floating clumps of vegetation dislodged from their original locations, in the manner noted by Renner et al. to have occurred in the case of certain other plant species. As to specific ocean currents which could have transported plant material of D. metel from the New to the Old World, Geeta and Gharaibeh suggest that transport by the Gulf Stream followed by capture by the Canary Current could have brought the plant first across the Atlantic Ocean to Africa.

By contrast, a possible human-mediated route would involve first eminently feasible land transport from Mexico to Ecuador and Peru, borne out by observations of the ritual use of Datura in these South American countries. This would be followed by water transport across the Pacific Ocean from South America to Oceania (as is recognised to have taken place in the case of the sweet potato) and finally from Oceania to Southeast Asia and South Asia.

=== Sacred status in Africa ===
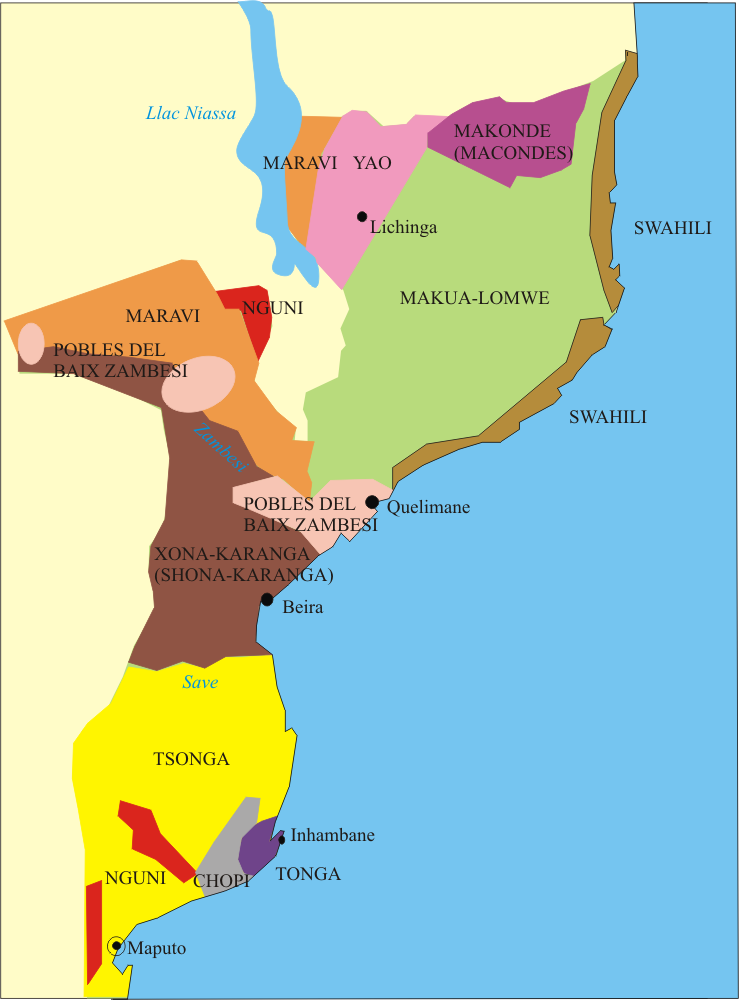
Map of the ethnic groups of Mozambique, showing, in yellow, the area inhabited by the Tsonga.

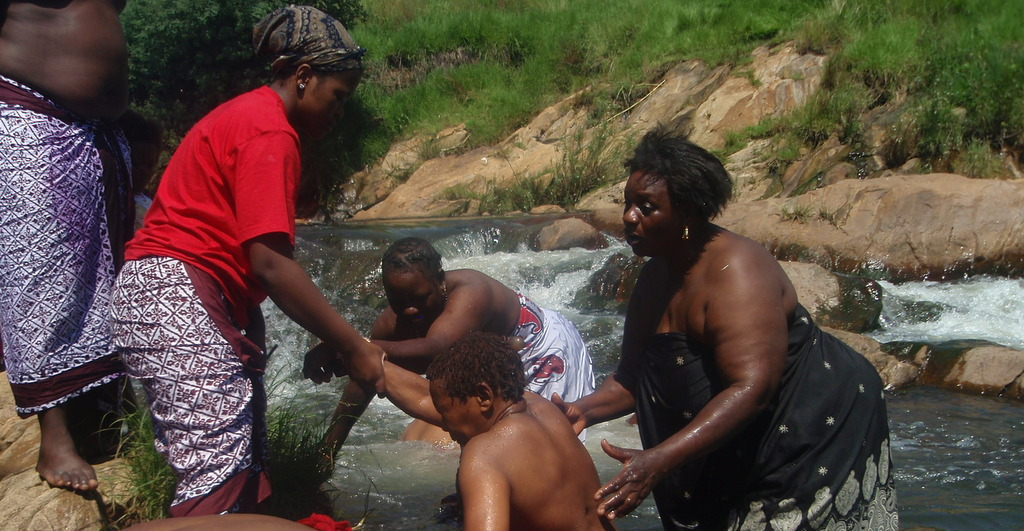
Tsonga river-rite: ritual bathing scene.

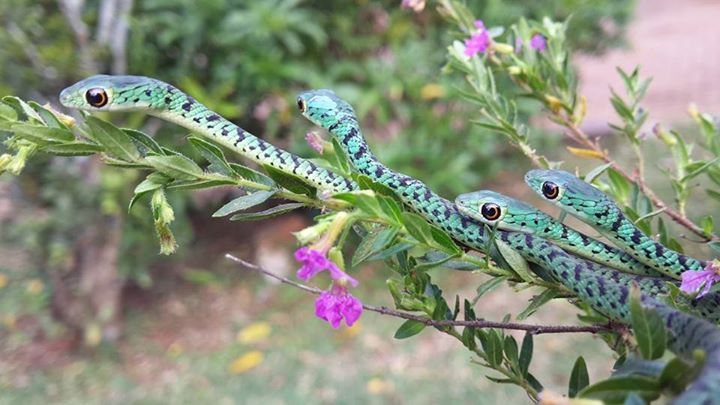
Young individuals of a species of Philothamnus, the genus to which belongs the sacred snake shihundje revered by the Tsonga and conjectured by Johnston to be seen in the mavala-vala vision of the initiatory Datura trance.

Documentation of the traditional use of hallucinogens in Africa has lagged behind that of such use in the Americas, so the use of Datura metel 'Fastuosa' by the Tsonga people (Shangana-Tsonga) of Mozambique and the Northern Transvaal in their khomba puberty school initiation rite — as recorded by Dr. Thomas F. Johnston — is of particular interest.

According to Johnston, Datura fastuosa (i.e. Datura metel 'Fastuosa') has the common name mondzo (alternative spelling mondjo, the name being shared also with the (unrelated) Combretum imberbe) in the Tsonga language and is a subspontaneous plant in the homeland of the Tsonga. Interestingly, in an (otherwise conventional) brief description of the plant he describes the seeds as being "blackish brown", rather than the pale, somewhat tawny shade of brown normal to those of Datura metel cultivars. Khomba neophytes consuming a potion prepared from the plant forms the culmination of three months of rituals which are timed to follow the May harvest and involve ritual bathing (immersion) and the performing of secret mimes, dances and songs.

The climactic Datura rite goes by the evocative name of rendzo ra mianakanyo (trans. : "journey of fantasy") and involves 'hearing' the voice of the fertility god and experiencing a hallucinatory vision of bluish-green colour patterns having the Tsonga name mavala-vala. This 'journey in spirit' is reinforced with tactile stimuli and vocal cues from one of their "schoolmothers" (acting in the role of psychopomp), the girls being ritually beaten with a Datura switch through the blankets in which they are lying swaddled, while being told repeatedly that it is the mavala-vala which they are seeing. Johnston hypothesises that the mavala-vala visions may be symbolic representations of a local (blue-green) snake belonging to the genus Philothamnus (Tsonga: shihundje), individuals of which the Tsonga believe to be manifestations of the divine. According this theory, the mavala-vala would be a vision of the serpent form of the very fertility god whose voice is 'heard' by the initiates of the khomba in their Datura-induced trance.

The rituals of the khomba puberty school are designed to prepare girls for child-bearing, playing out in highly-structured dramatic form the various aspects of female sexuality, with particular emphasis on fertility. A major symbolic theme in this transition from girlhood to womanhood is the crossing of a river, thoroughly in keeping with the sense in which initiation is always a symbolic death.

Further death symbolism is present in the Datura potion itself, which always contains a small amount either of human fat or powdered human bone - ingredients which traditionally feature in Tsonga witchcraft, but in this instance are intended to counter malign witchcraft aimed at blighting fertility. Johnston points out that it is this endocannibalistic element in the ritual and not Datura that has witchcraft associations in Tsonga culture, but points out that Solanaceous hallucinogens had very definite associations with witchcraft in Early Modern Europe. To this, however, might be added a further comparison with Early Modern European witchcraft, in which practitioners were accused of employing the fat from the corpses of unbaptised babies in the preparation of flying ointments infused with tropane-containing, hallucinogenic Solanaceous plants (and other toxic herbs). Again, the Tsonga and European practices are curiously reminiscent of the Tantric ritual to cause insanity.

Within a strictly Tsonga frame of reference, Johnston points out a marked similarity between a form of trial by ordeal known as mondjo (observed at the beginning of the 20th century by ethnographer of the Tsonga, Henri Alexandre Junod) and the Datura rite of the khomba puberty school which he observed himself in the course of the research he carried out during the period 1968-70:

In both instances, the Datura fastuosa potion was explained as containing either human fat or powdered human bone; the ceremony occurred by a river and involved a nearby tree; the patients formed a line along the ground; the officiant waved a head dress by vigorous shaking of the head...So far as is known, Tsonga use of Datura fastuosa is restricted to trial by ordeal (a suspect must survive a given dose in order to prove his innocence), and the described final rite of the girls' puberty school.

Johnston fails to note that the ordeal name mondjo is simply a variant spelling of the Tsonga name for Datura metel 'Fastuosa' as is made plain from a reading of Junod's account of this ritual, the full name of which is ku nwa mondjo (trans. "drinking the Datura (potion)"). The Tsonga consider their ordeal-by-Datura the supreme method for unmasking the supernatural witches known as baloyi. Baloyi are believed to inherit their uncanny powers through the maternal line, and these consist of the ability to separate their souls from their "bodies" and send them out to nocturnal gatherings where the working of all manner of evil is plotted - notably theft, murder and the enslaving of others. The noyi, or separable soul, is believed to fly off to its evil assignation on great wings, like those of a bird or bat, while what remains behind on the sleeping mat appears to the uninitiated to be a sleeping human body, but is actually a second type of (material) soul - the ntjhuti, or shadow, which Junod describes as "a wild beast, the one with which the noyi has chosen to identify himself". He cites an example in which a husband wounds such a spirit beast - in this instance a hyaena - at night, only to find that when his wife's wandering spirit returns in the morning it has been wounded in the leg, like the hyaena.

Junod does not actually fully identify the plant involved in the Tsonga witch-finding ritual:

The mondjo is a plant of the Solaneae [sic.] family which possesses intoxicating properties...it seems that the mondjo dries up the saliva of all who drink it, but, in the case of the truly guilty, this effect is greatly accentuated; the jaws become locked. They try to speak but can only say be-be-be-be (they stammer).

However, the intoxicating effect combined with a drying-up of the mouth referred to above points to a species containing tropane alkaloids, such as Datura, and the identity of the plant is established, many years later, by Johnston's linking of the name mondjo (under the variant spelling mondzo) specifically with Datura metel 'Fastuosa'.

In the early 1900s, the preparation of the mondjo drink was confined to a particular, small clan, the Shihahu, who lived on the left bank of the Nkomati river, not far from the sea and a little to the north of the Manyisa district of Maputo Province. The Shihahu cultivated the mondjo plant for use as the major active ingredient of their ordeal poison-cum-hallucinogen, although Junod notes that their recipe for the "magic philter" was "very complicated and intricate" and contained "several strange ingredients", of which the most macabre was purely symbolic, not psychotropic - namely a small amount of fat or bone from the body of a long-dead leper. If Johnston is correct in his conjecture that the Tsonga rite of female initiation is connected with the mondjo ordeal, the ingredients of the recipes for the respective potions involved may have been similar. In the context of active potion ingredients other than Datura metel 'Fastuosa', Johnston records the following of the fourth stage of the puberty school initiation which he witnessed:

Soon a screaming medium (a disguised "schoolmother") appears suddenly out of the bush, garbed in bandoliers of dried hallucinogenic agents (Datura fastuosa, toads' skins etc.)...

The potion employed in the puberty school rite was not necessarily a simple Datura infusion - the addition of toad skins would modify considerably a basic intoxication caused by tropane alkaloids, by the addition of bufotenine and other hallucinogenic tryptamines. Junod mentions only unspecified "strange ingredients" in the potion concocted by the Shihahu, but, in the light of Johnston's research, one such seems likely to have been toad skins, (and additional psychotropic plant species cannot be ruled out). Johnston does not specify the toad species involved and further research is needed to establish whether or not any of the species of amphibian native to Mozambique secretes psychotropic compounds in its skin.

=== Sacred status in Hinduism ===
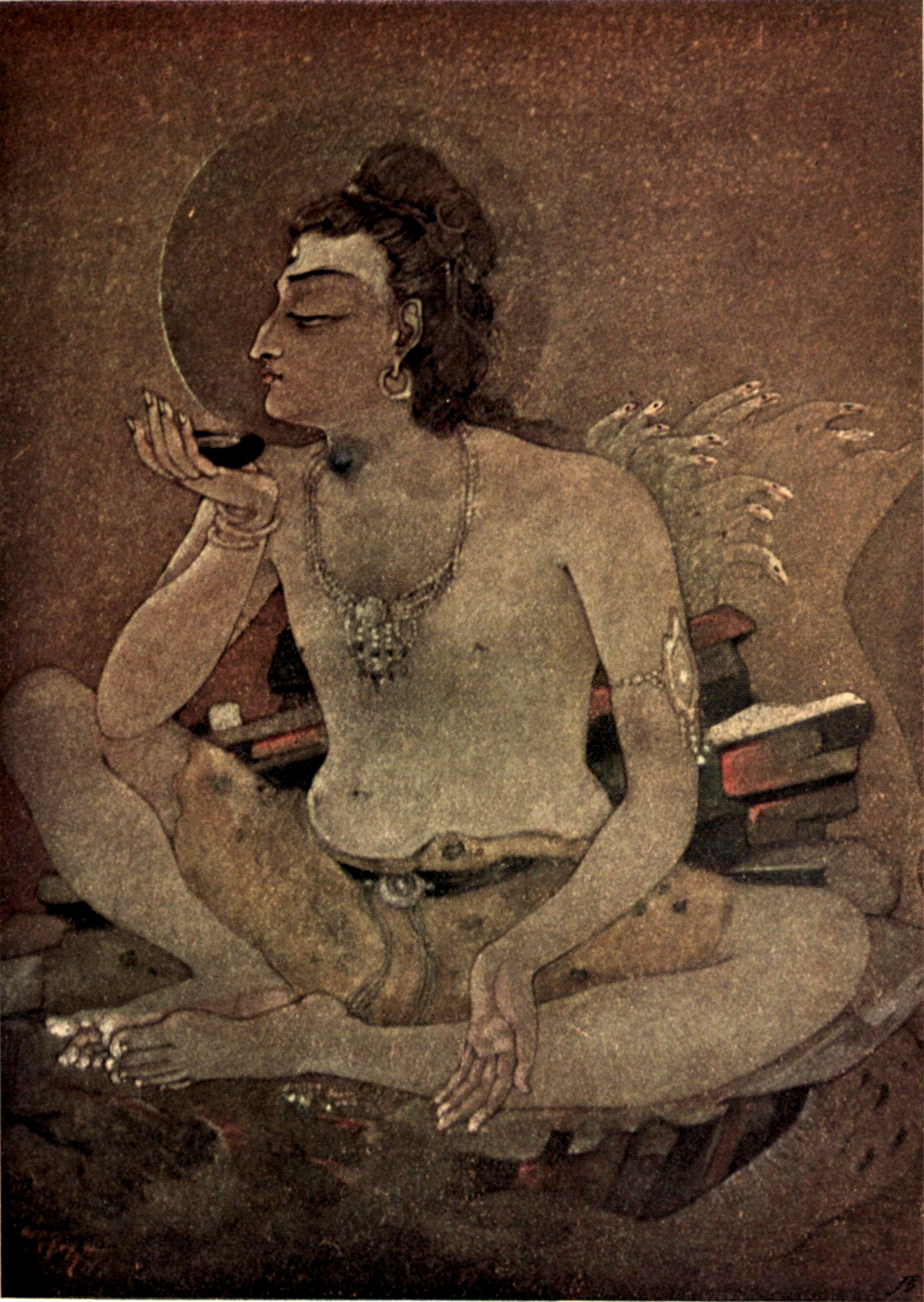
The deity Shiva drinks the cosmic poison churned from the Ocean of Milk. Note the swollen blue spot in the throat of the god caused by transmutation of the Datura-engendering poison Halahala.

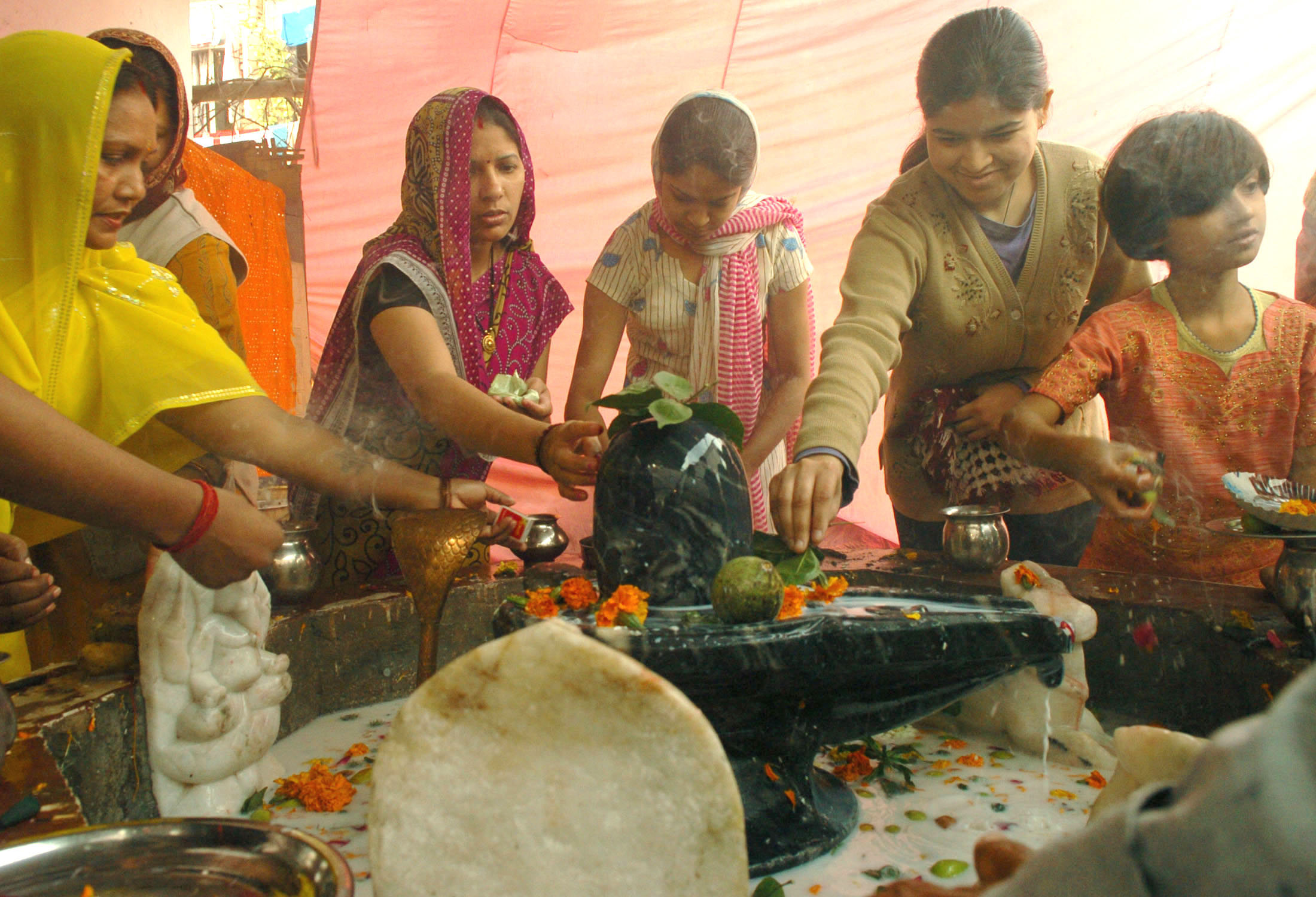
Devotees of Shiva making a milk offering of fruits and flowers on a yoni lingam. Note flowering bud of Datura metel on lip of carved yoni (below and left of small, brass pot).

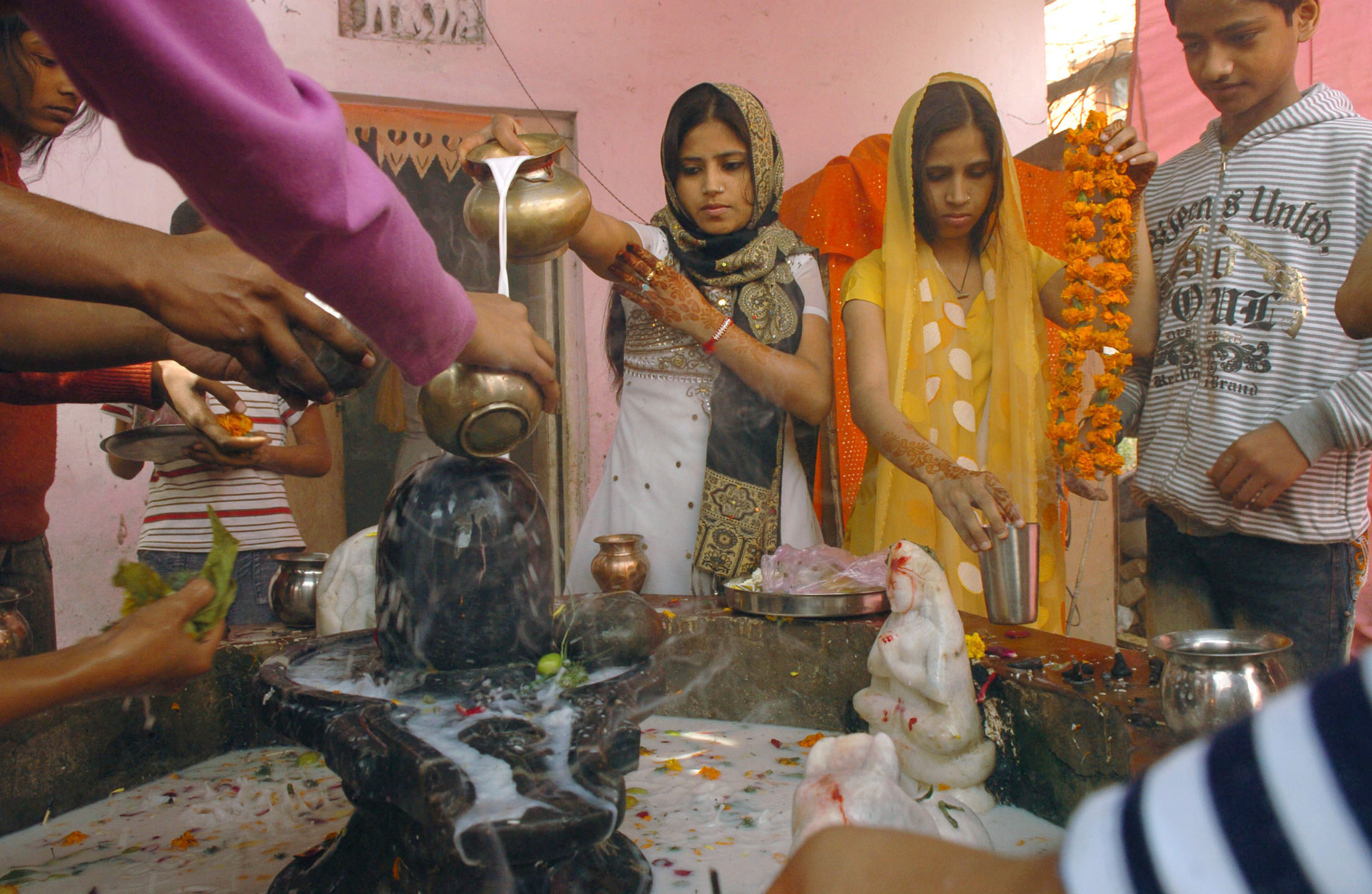
Same ceremony as in image above. Note Datura metel fruit (prickly, green object, bottom centre, beside smooth, green fruit in channel at base of lingam).

Shiva remains in divine intoxication. Hence, his association with dhatūra or thorn-apple...which has hallucinogenic properties. Dhatūra is called shiva-shekhara, the crown of Shiva. It is believed to have emerged from Shiva's chest after he drank the deadly poison, halahal, produced during the churning of the cosmic ocean. Its leaves and fruit are offered to Shiva on special days.

The above is a quotation from a contemporary article devoted to Hindu liturgical practice and provides a rationale for the presentation of plant parts (often seed capsules) of Datura metel to the deity Shiva, integrated (no later, on evidence currently available, than the second century C.E.) into a much older mythological framework. The myth referenced, first occurring in the Mahābhārata and elaborated in the Purāṇas, is that of The Churning of the Ocean of Milk (Sanskrit Samudra manthan), in which two groups of gods, the Devas and the Asuras, churn the Cosmic Ocean of Milk (Sanskrit Kshira Sagara) to bring forth treasures. In the course of the churning, the terrible, choking poison Halahala emerges from the ocean before the treasures and threatens to overwhelm the cosmos. Only the god Shiva is strong enough to swallow the poison, thus neutralising it, and, even in so doing, still requires the help of his consort, the goddess Parvati, who squeezes his throat to trap the poison there. Such is the potency of the poison that, even though Shiva is able to transmute it to make it harmless, it turns his throat permanently blue, so that, ever afterward one of his epithets has been Neelakanta — "the blue-throated one".

== Gallery ==
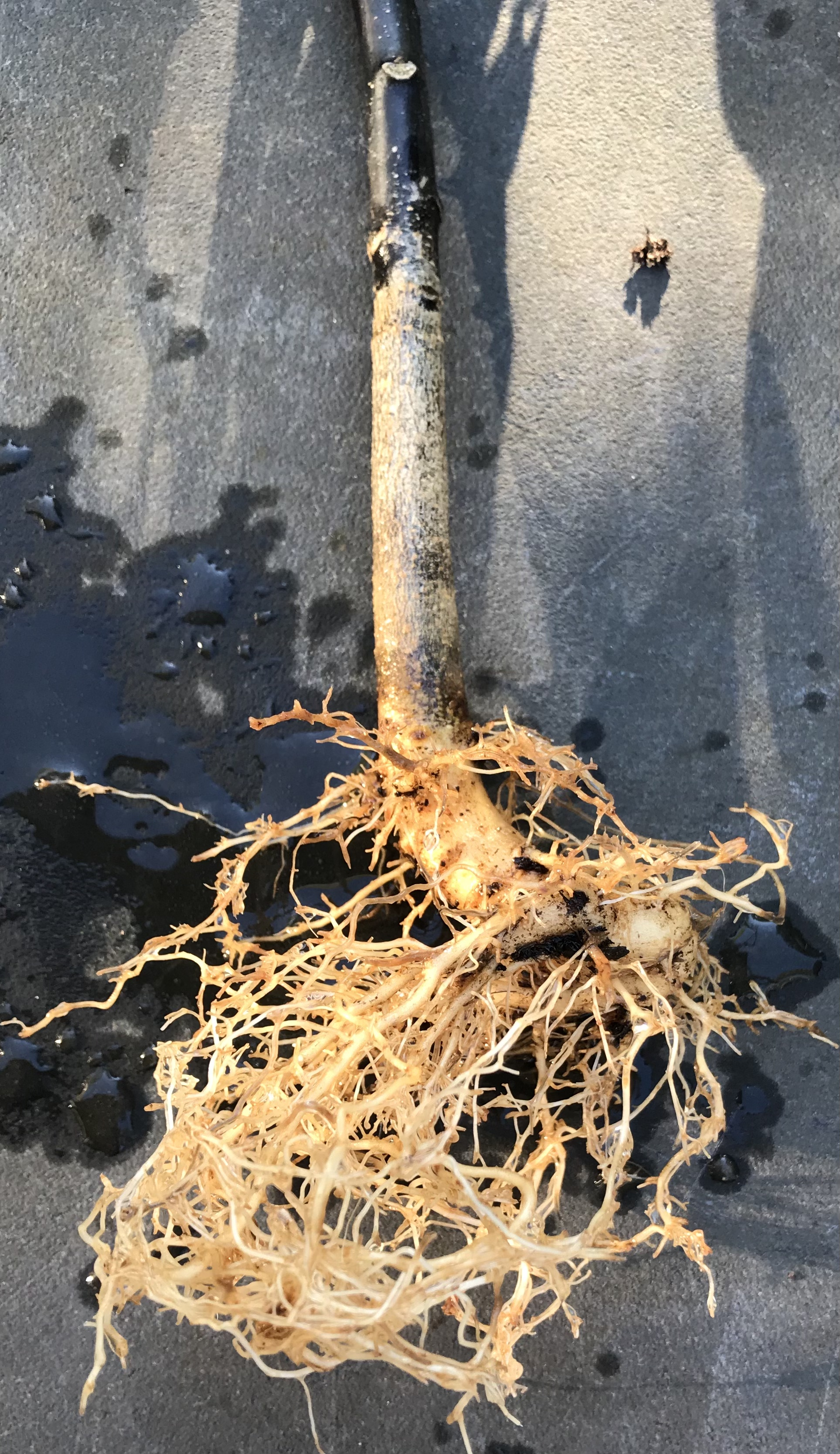
Exposed root system of D. metel 'Fastuosa'

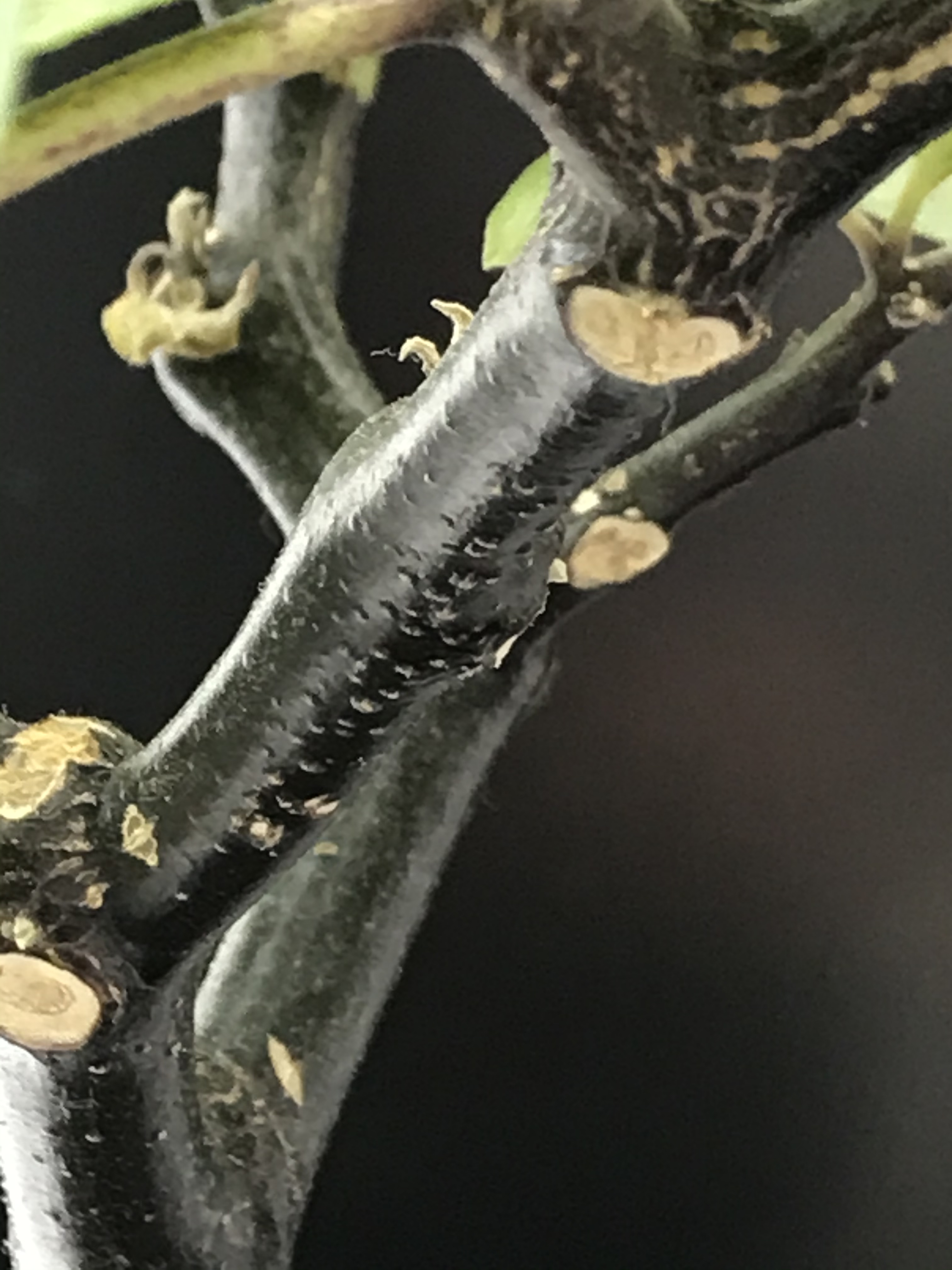
Glossy, black, forking stems bearing pale leaf scars

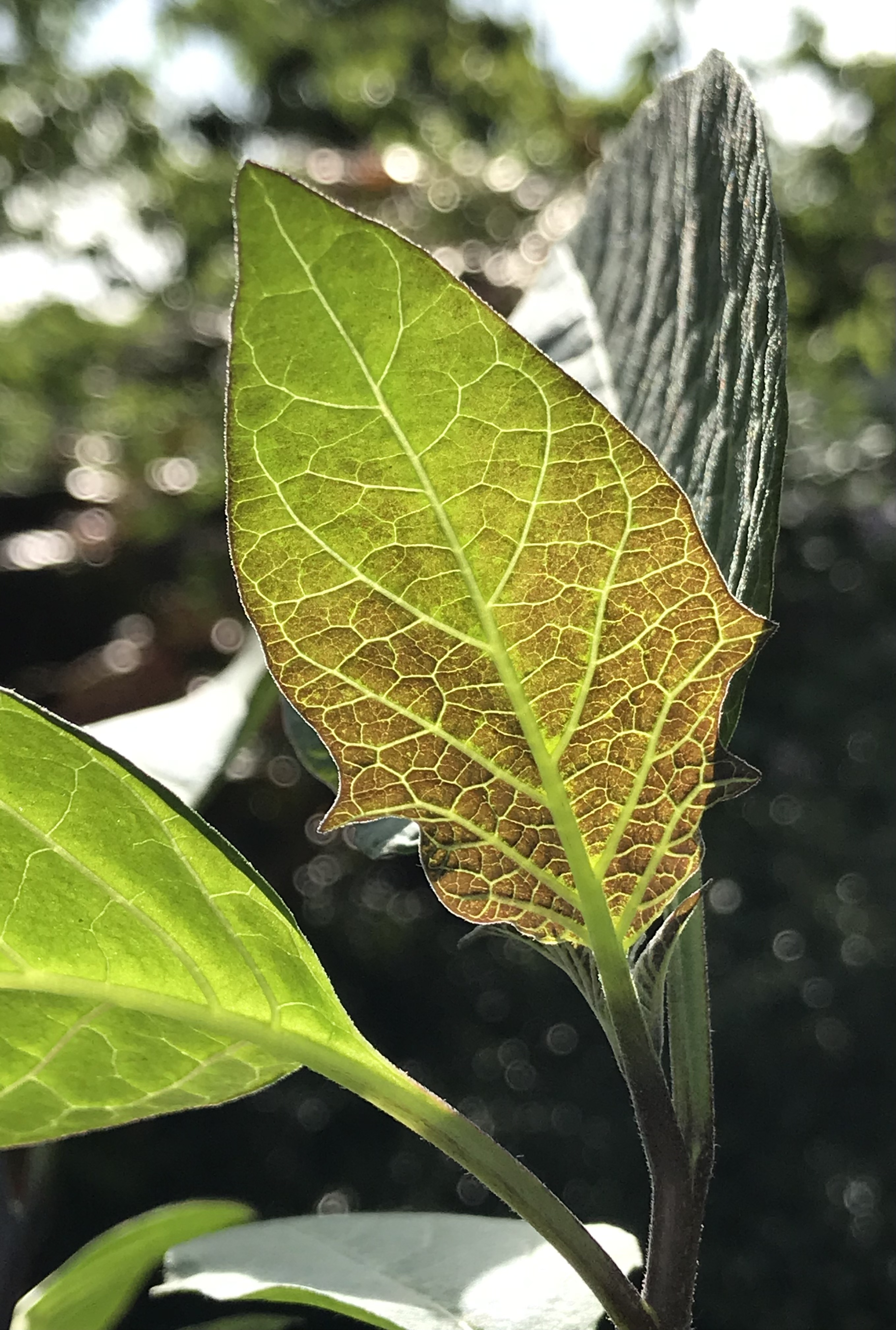
Underside of young leaf of D. metel 'Fastuosa' back-lit to show purplish pigmentation toward base of lamina

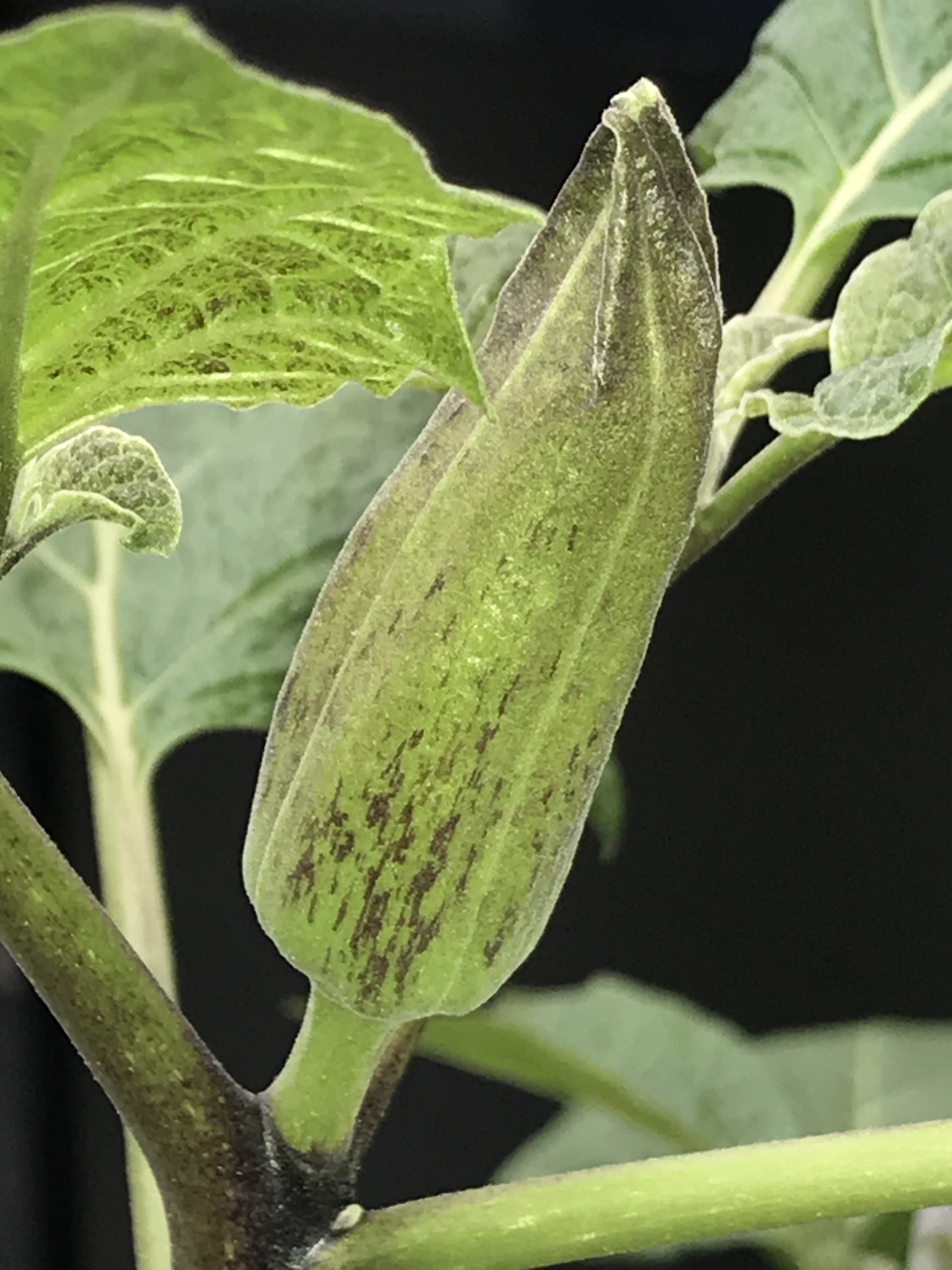
D. metel 'Fastuosa' developing bud, yet to open, showing characteristic purple striations of calyx

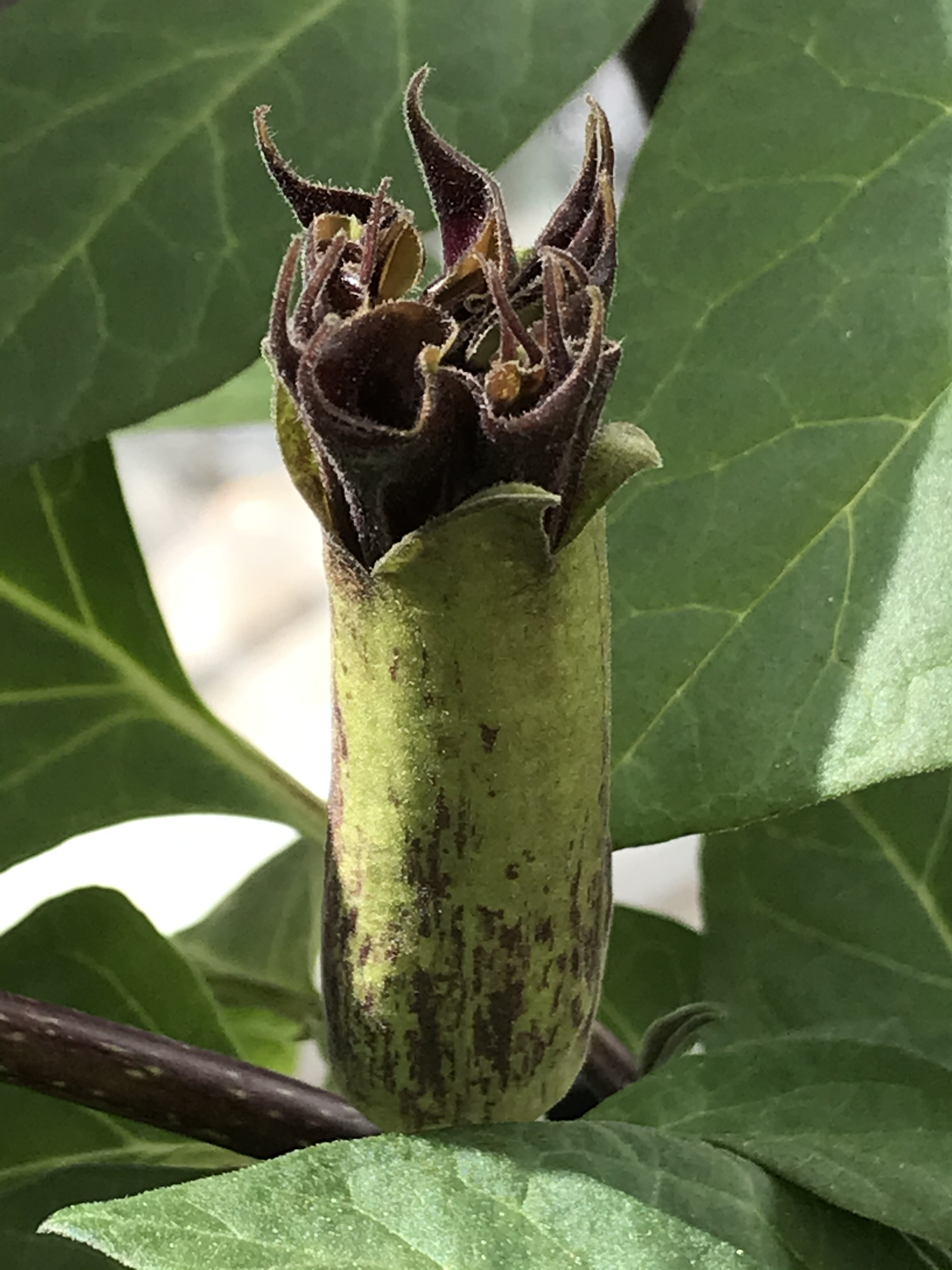
D. metel 'Fastuosa' - calyx lobes of bud open to reveal tightly-furled, pubescent, developing corolla

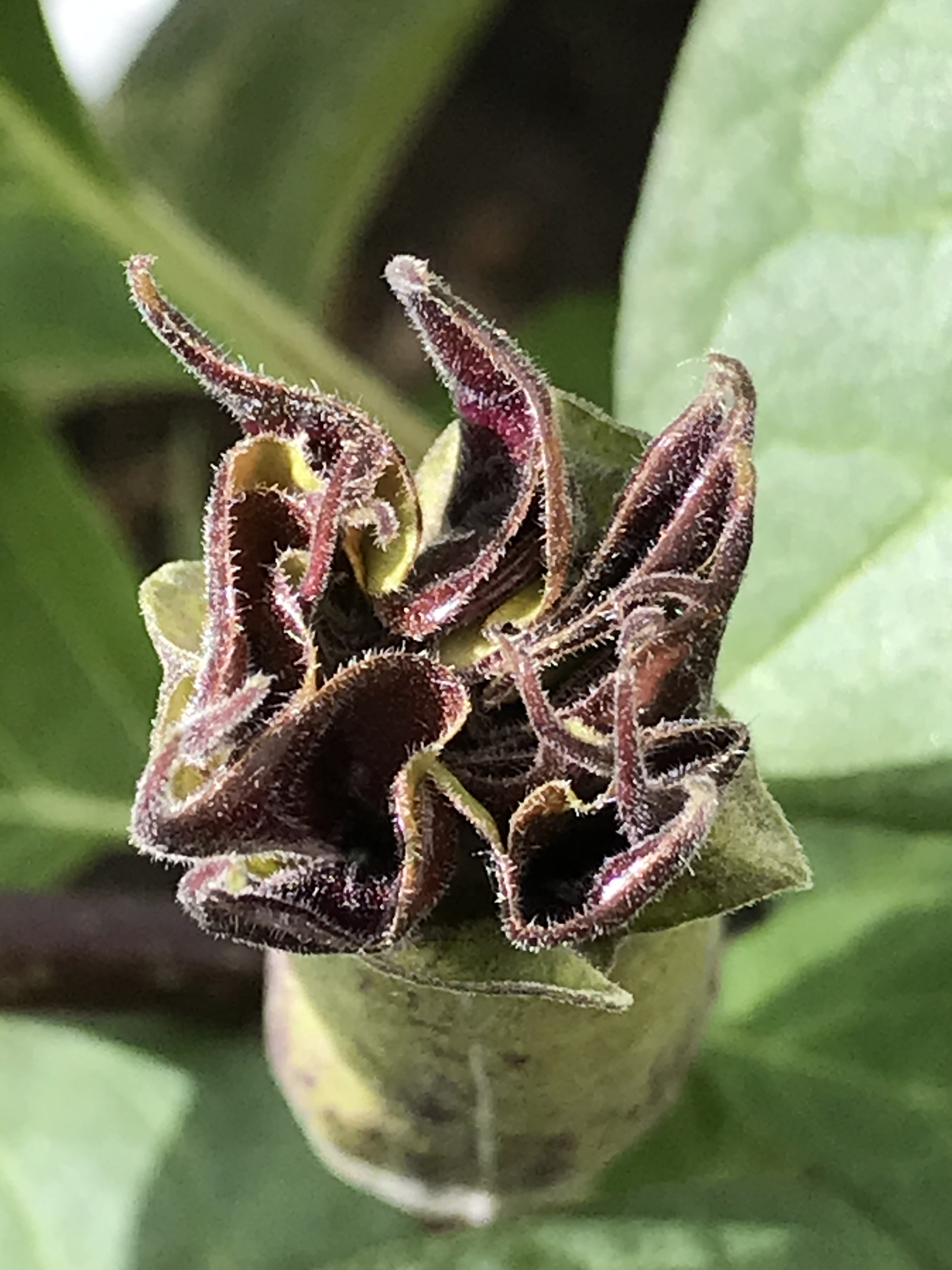
Detail of corolla of bursting bud, viewed from above, revealing pubescence

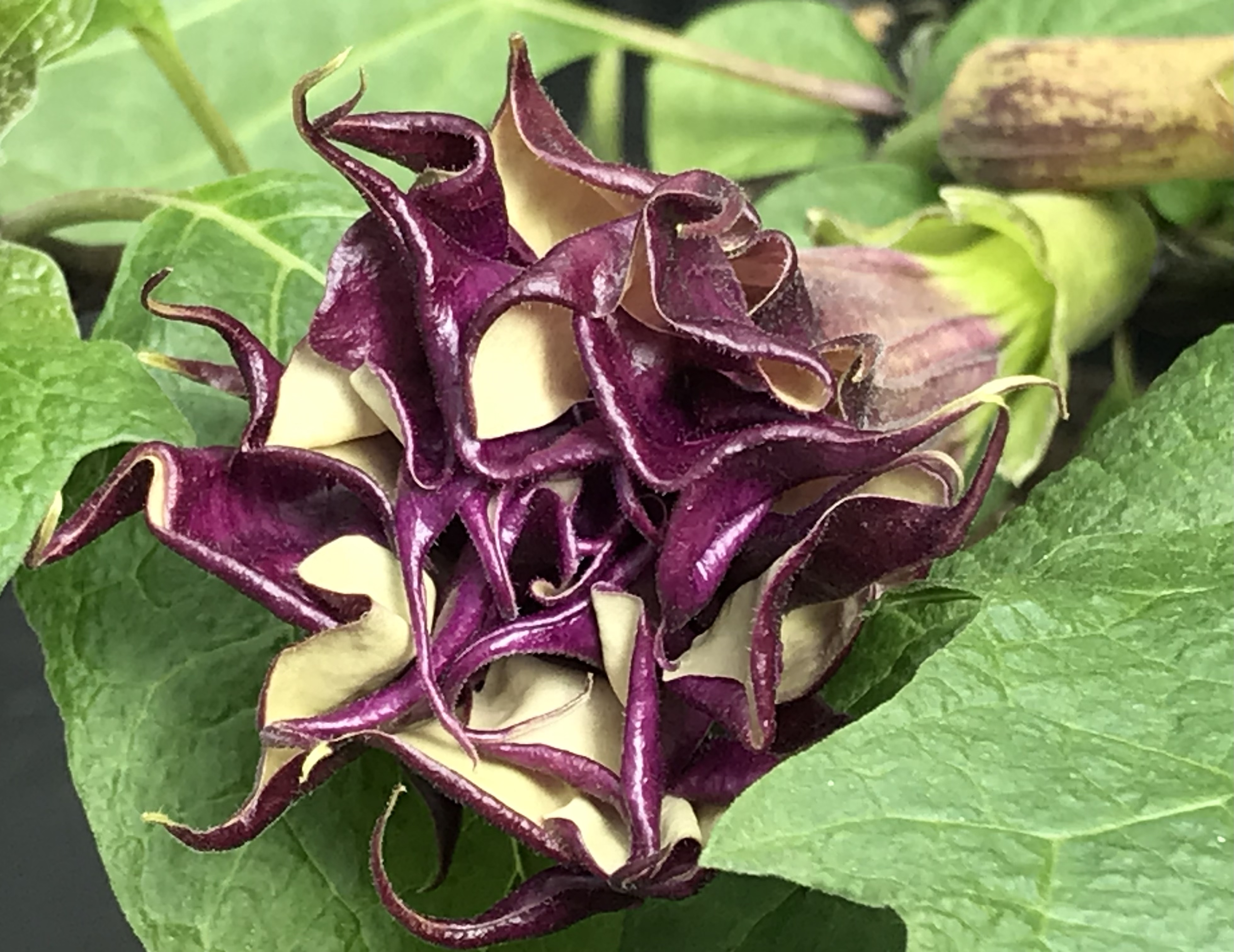
Triple-flowered D. metel 'Fastuosa' - first corolla fully extended, 3 corollas a tangle of claw-like teeth

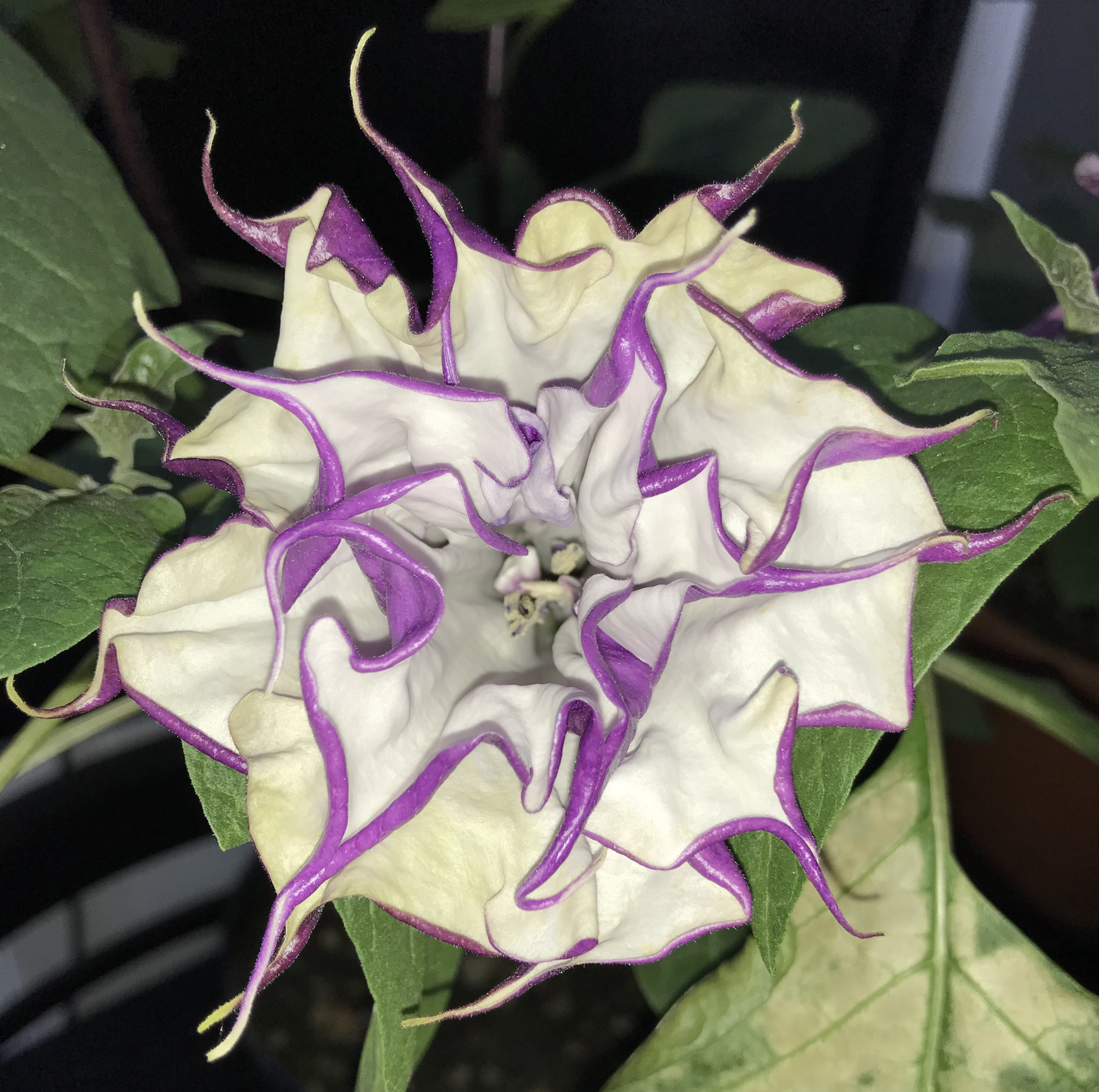
Corollas part-open, stigma and stamens visible in centre

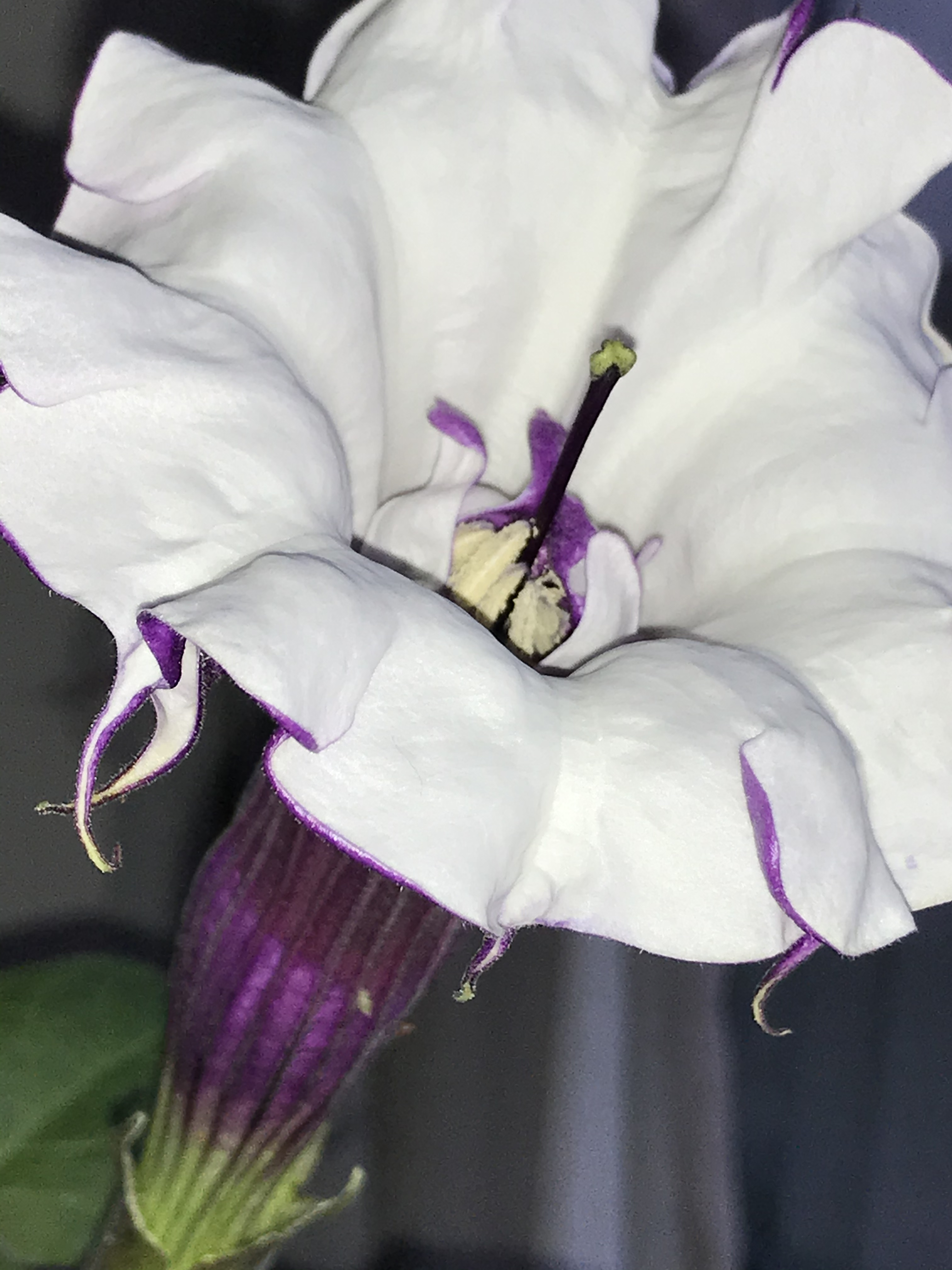
Datura metel 'Fastuosa' - fully-open, semi-double flower, showing protruding pistil

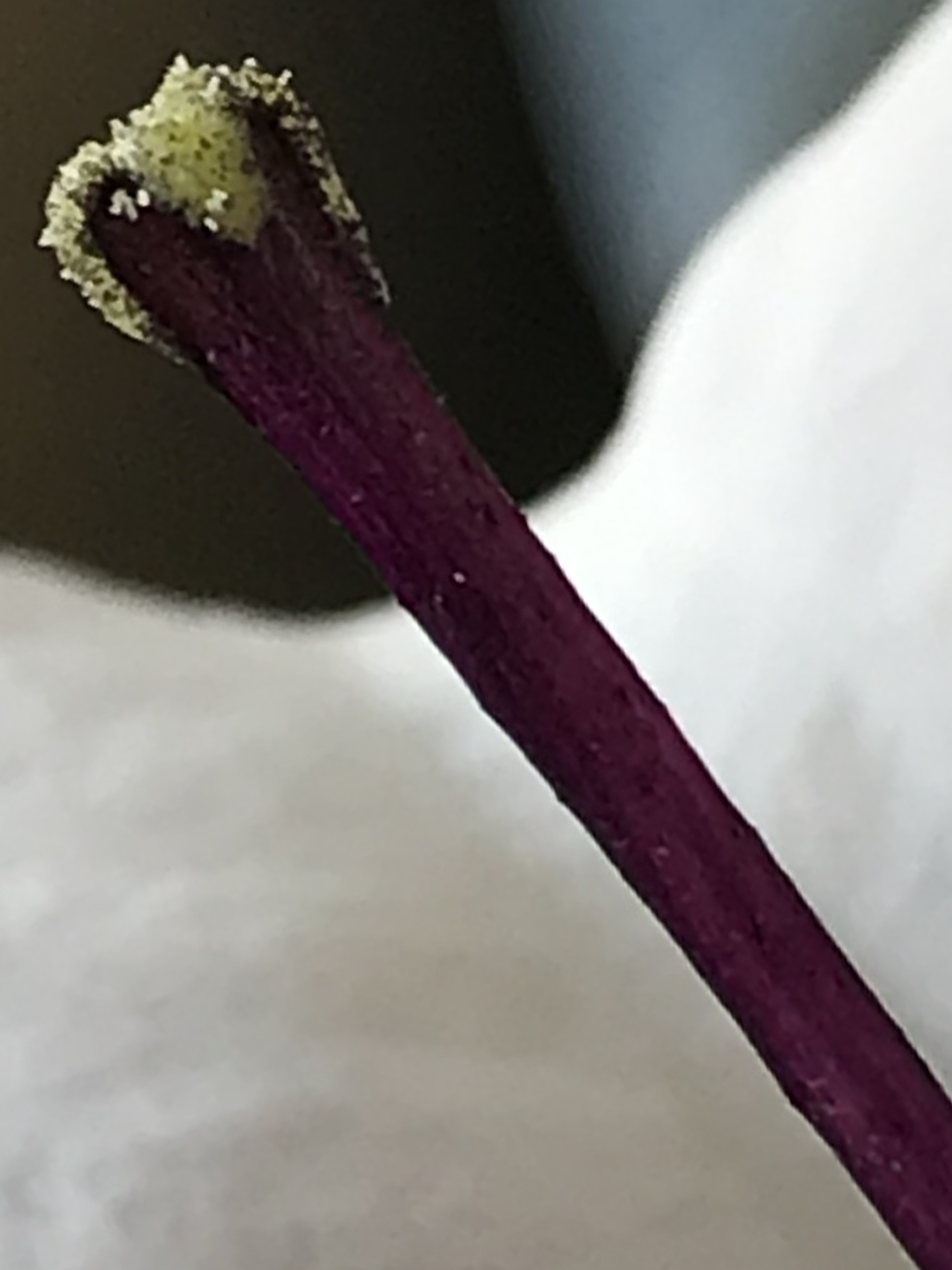
Extreme close-up of pollen-covered, three-lobed stigma, viewed in profile

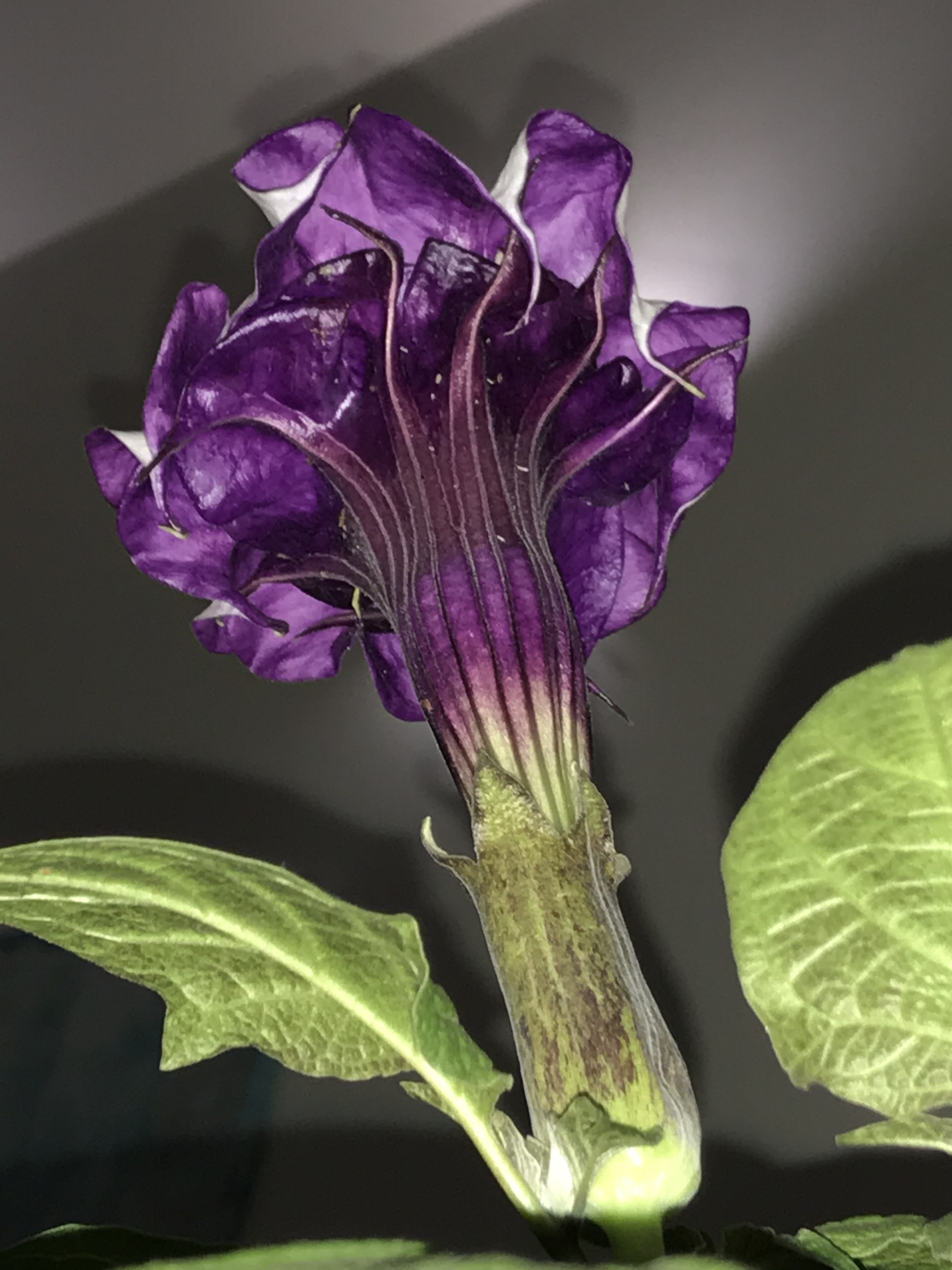
Datura metel 'Fastuosa' - Mature flower, viewed from beneath to show ribbing of purple corolla tube

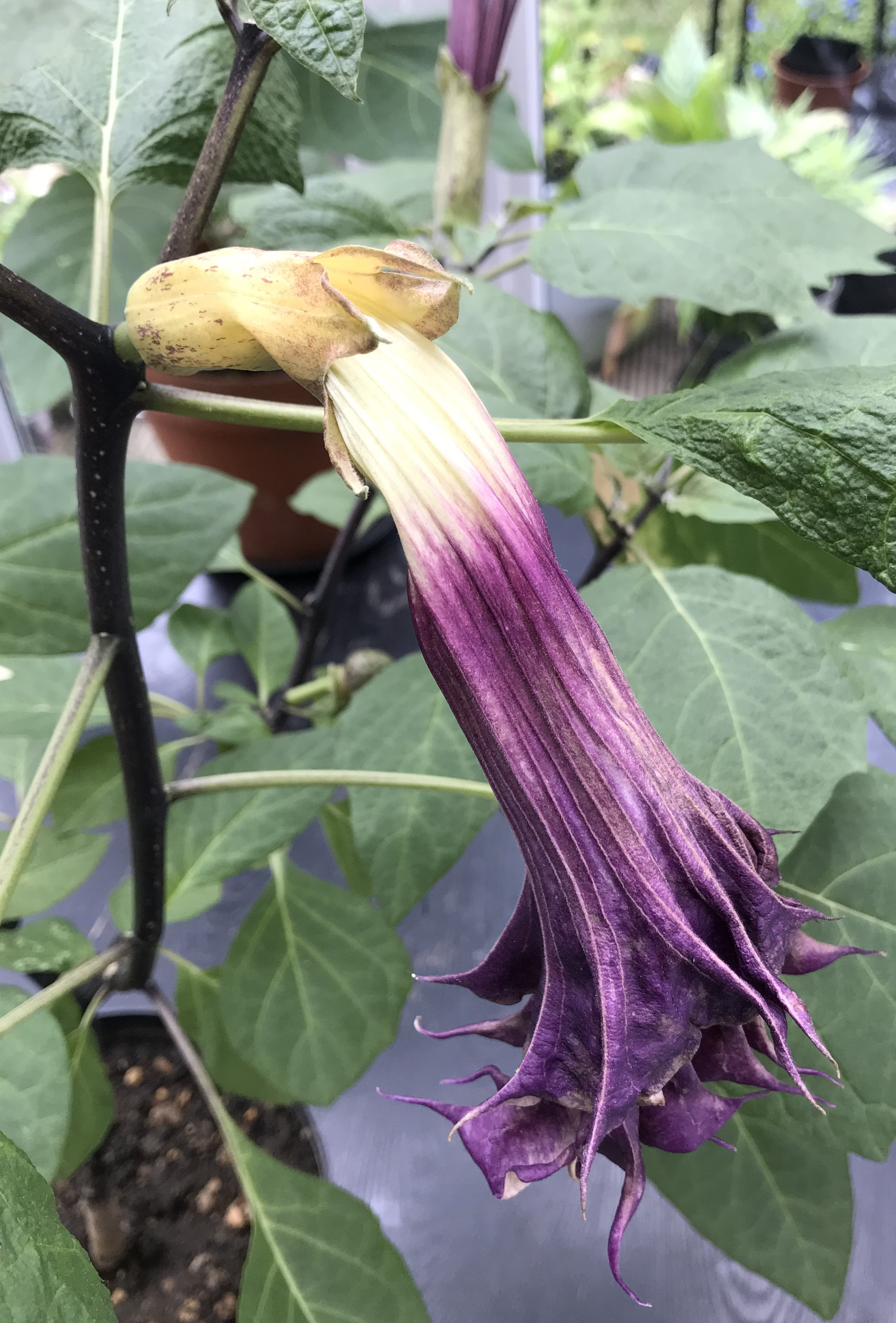
D. metel 'Fastuosa' - senescent flower, the yellowing calyx and drooping purple corolla soon to fall from young fruit

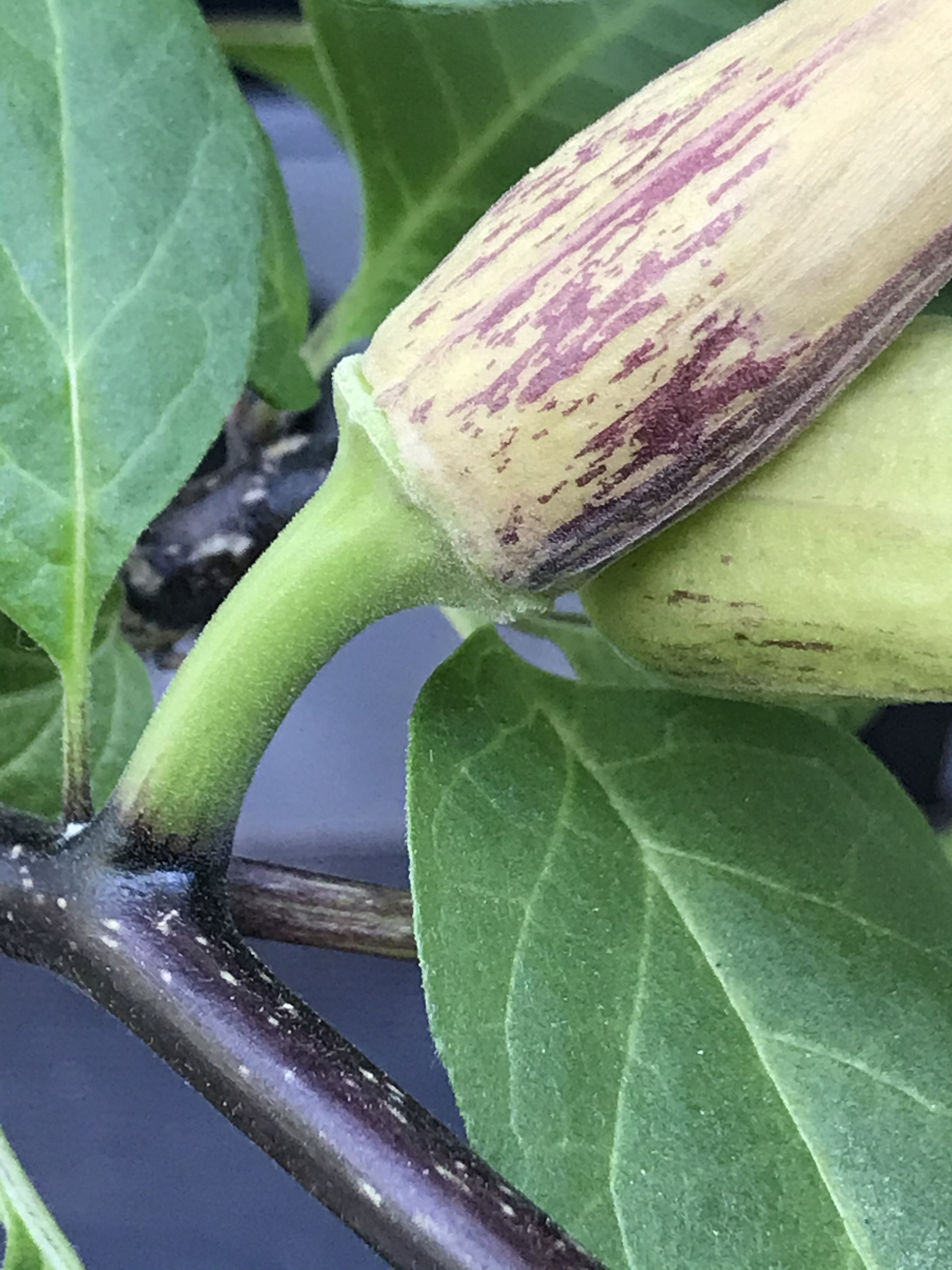
D. metel 'Fastuosa' detail of senescent flower: incipient abcission of faded fruiting calyx from frilled pedicel

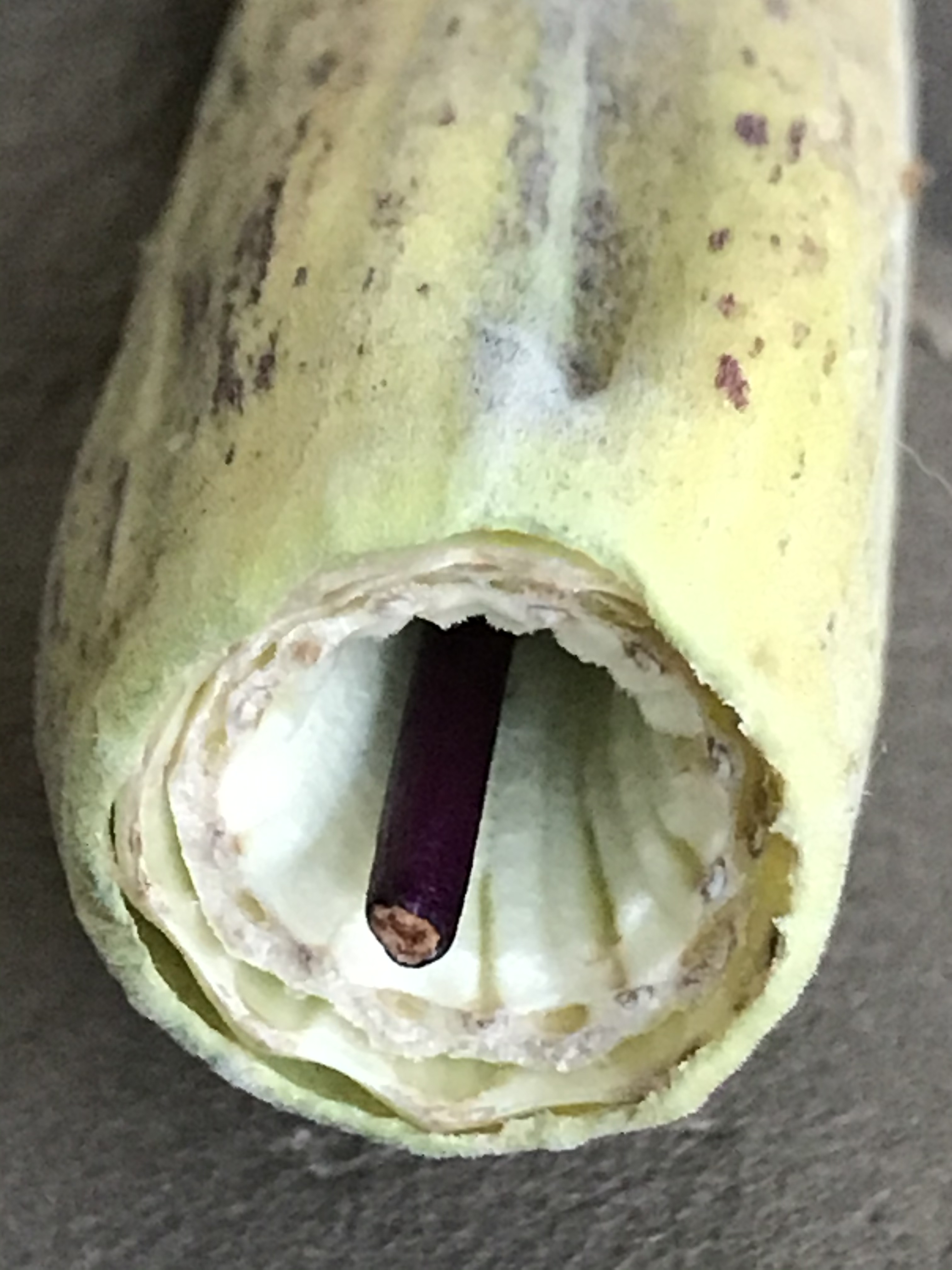
Datura metel 'Fastuosa' - extreme close-up of base of fallen flower - calyx, corollas & pistil

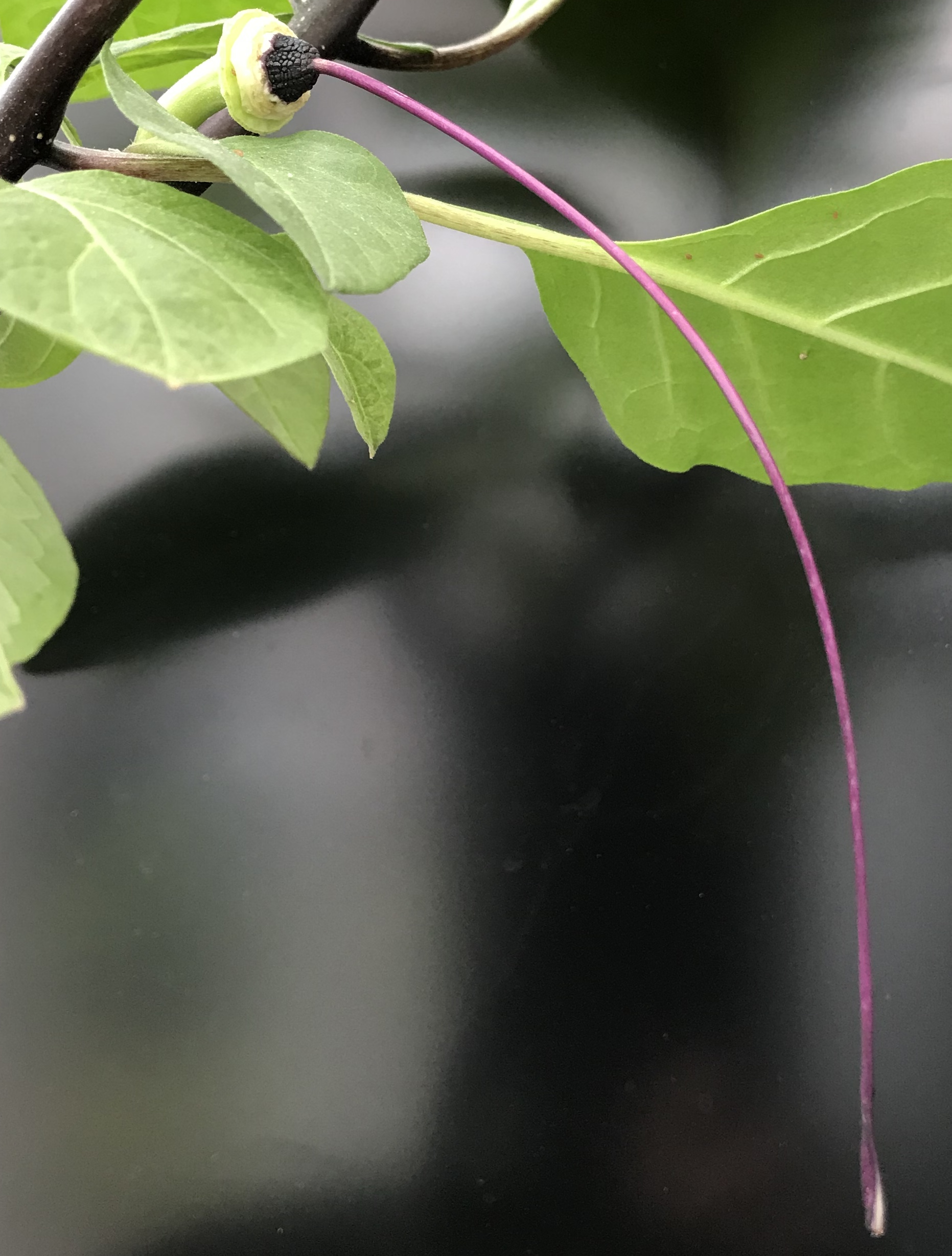
D. metel 'Fastuosa': young, purple-black fruit, with purple pistil still attached, just after fall of senescent corolla and calyx

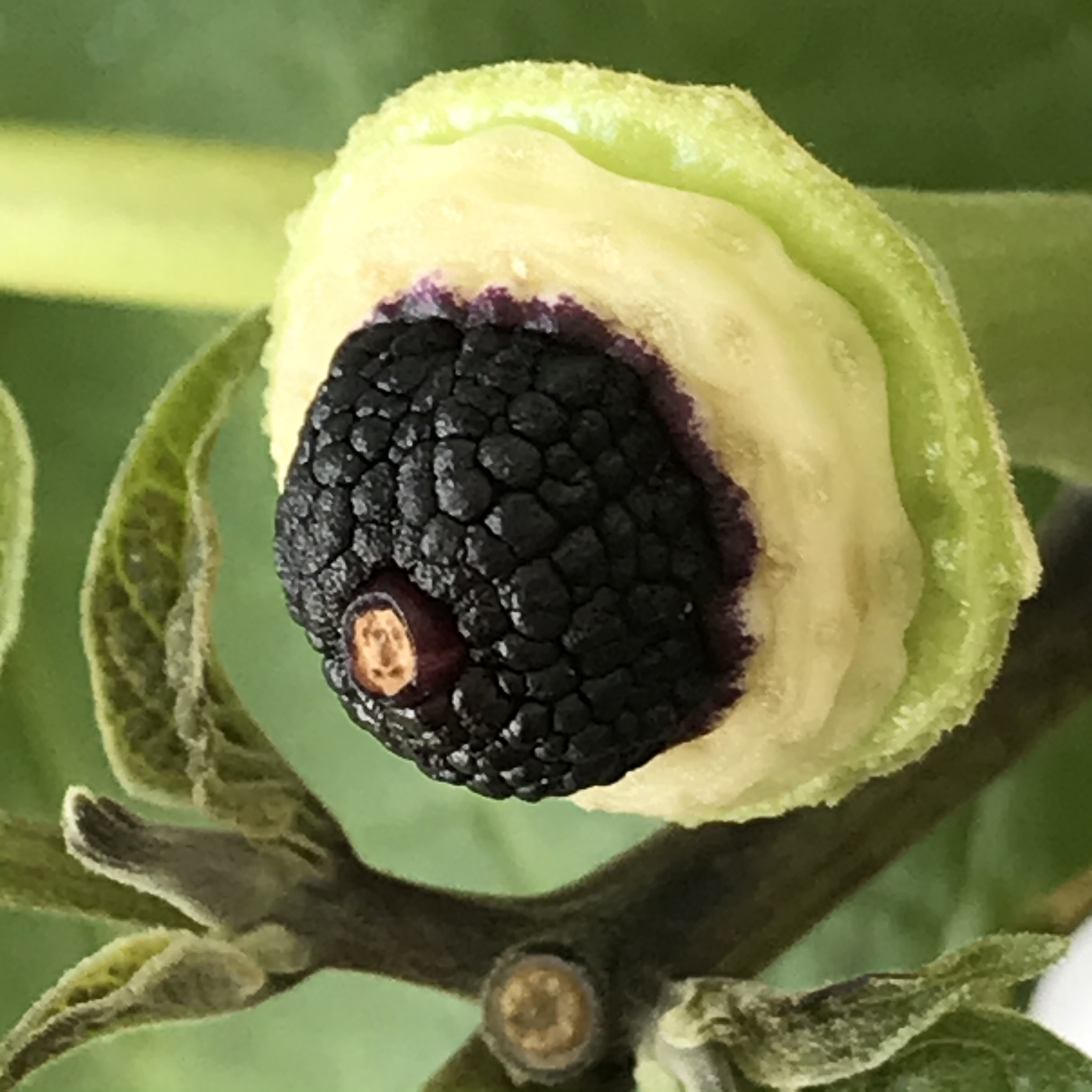
Extreme close-up of immature fruit of D. metel 'Fastuosa' shortly after fall of calyx, corolla and pistil

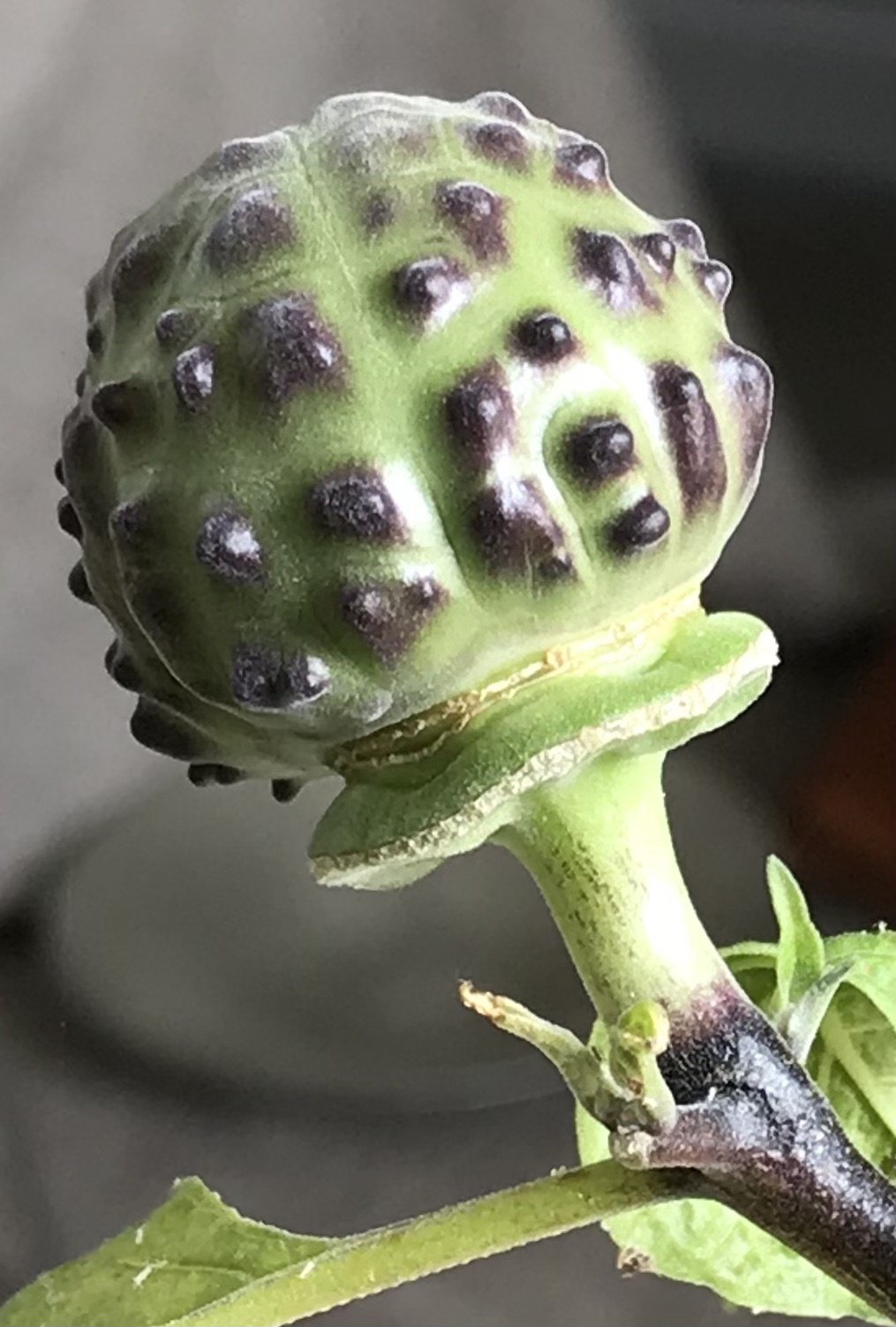
Datura metel 'Fastuosa' - tuberculate fruit nearing maturity

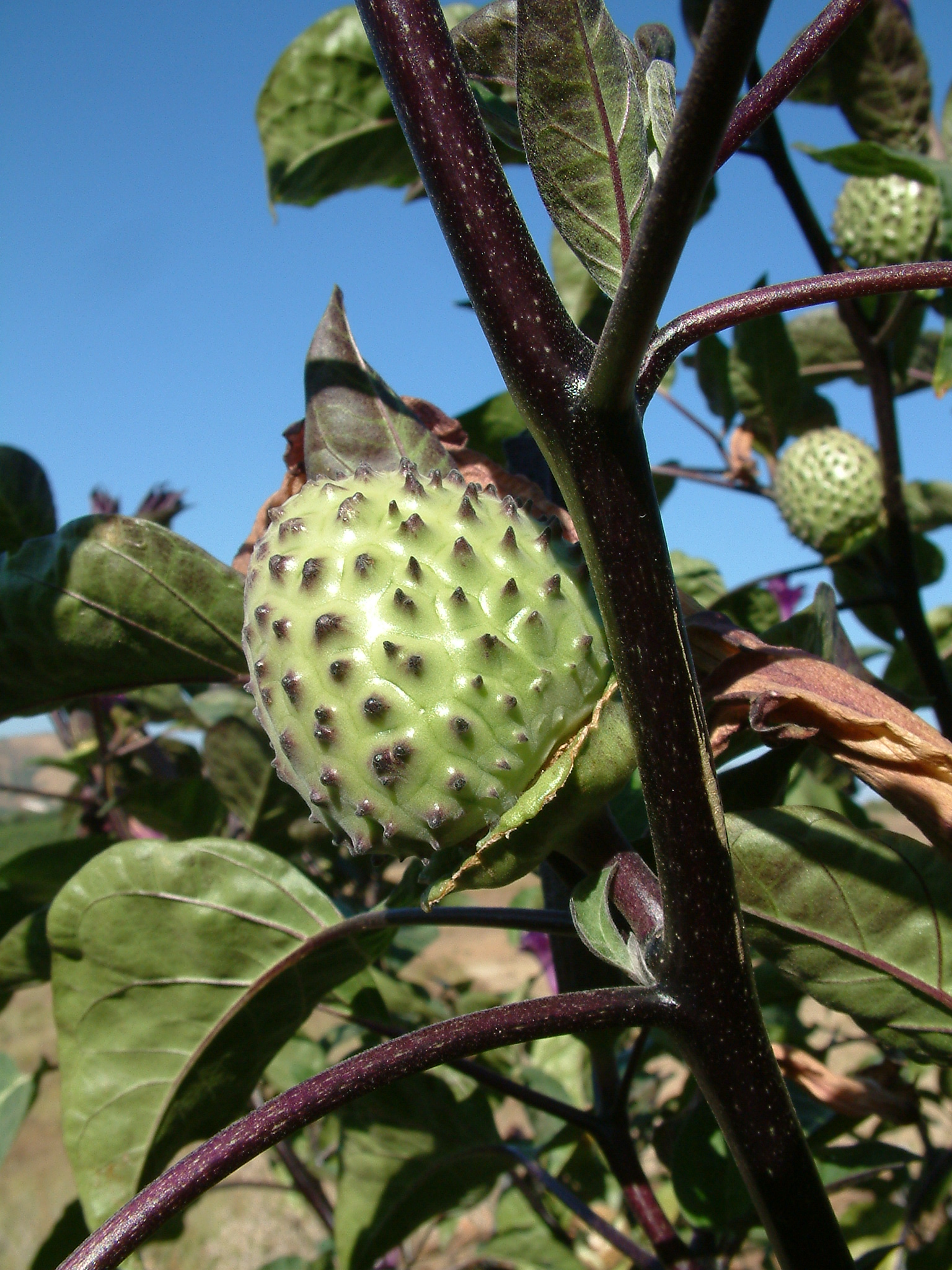
Ripening capsules of D. metel 'Fastuosa'

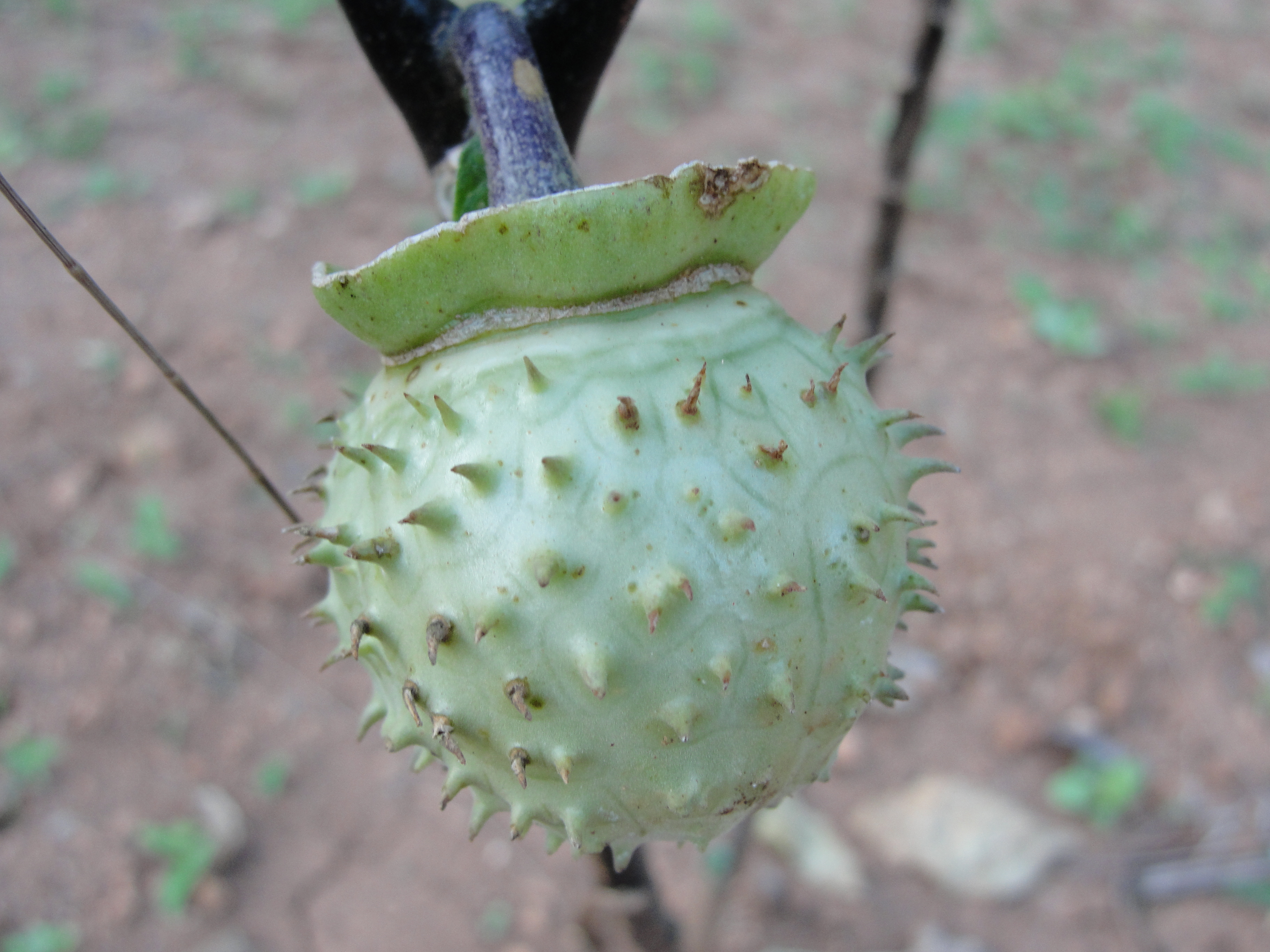
Single capsule (spiny variant) of D. metel 'Fastuosa'.

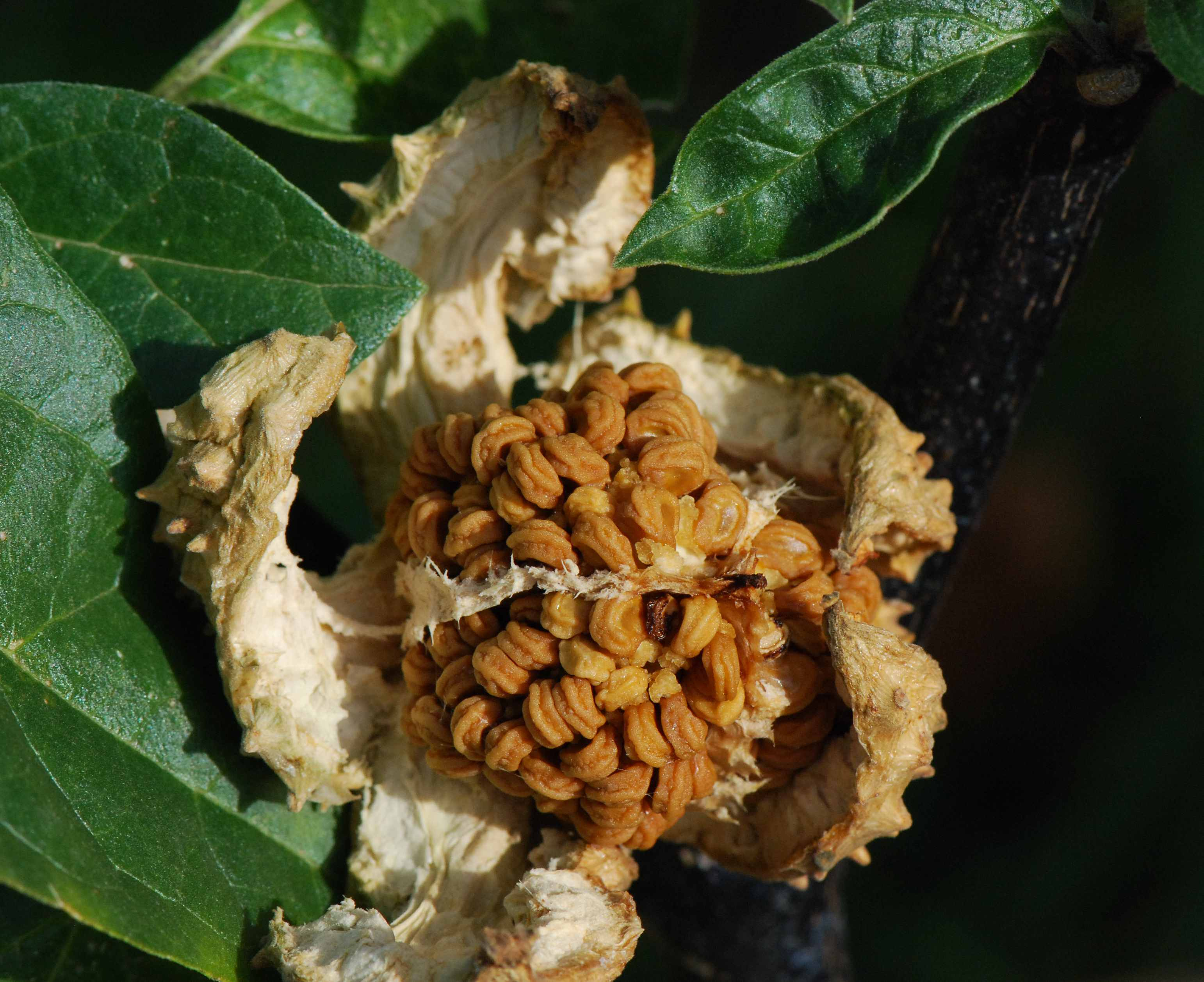
Irregular dehiscence of a ripe D. metel capsule, as described in the Sanskrit name छिद्रफल (chidráphala): "torn-apart fruit".

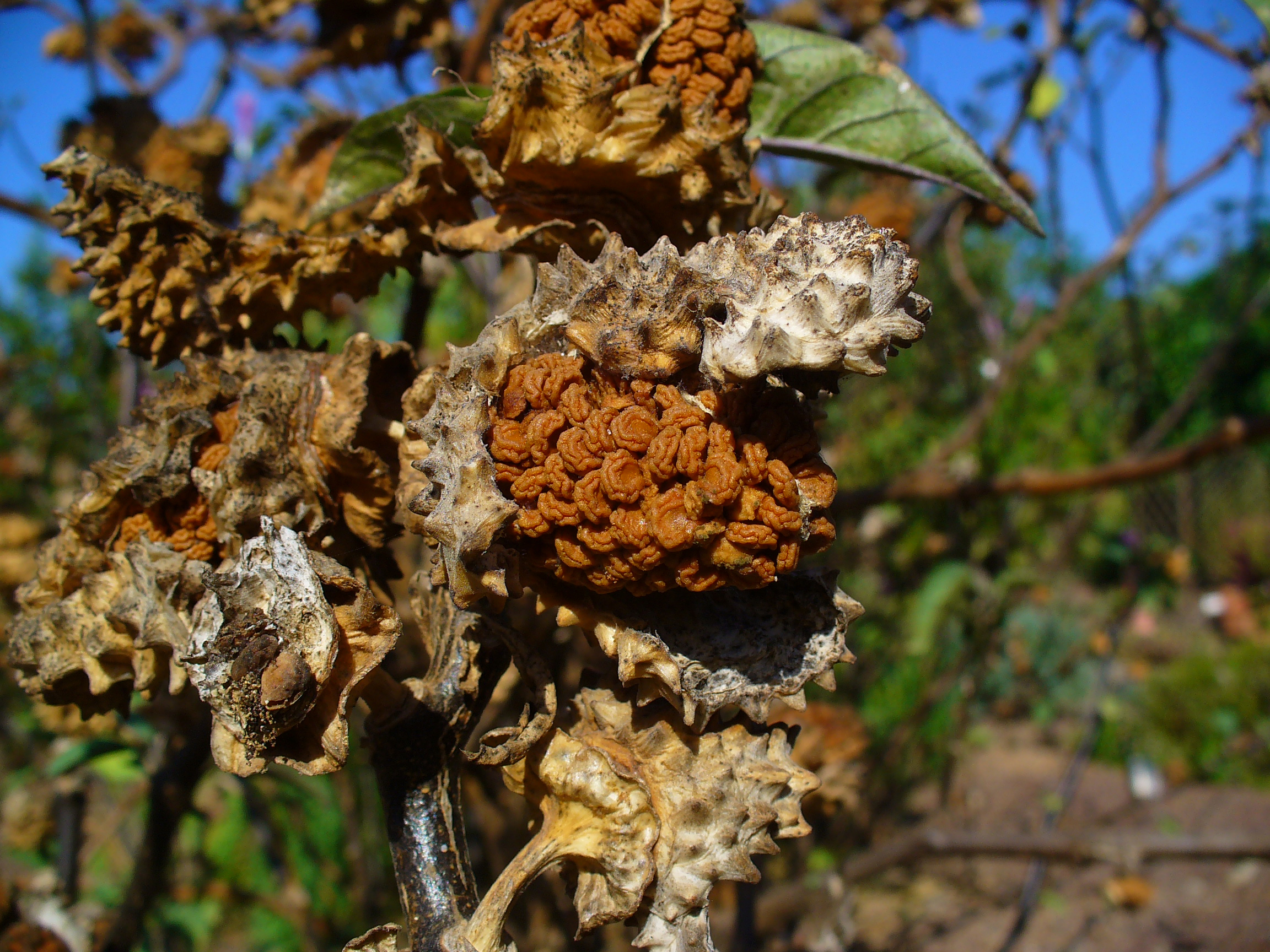
D. metel 'Fastuosa' Ripe capsules dehiscing irregularly by disintegration of fruit wall.

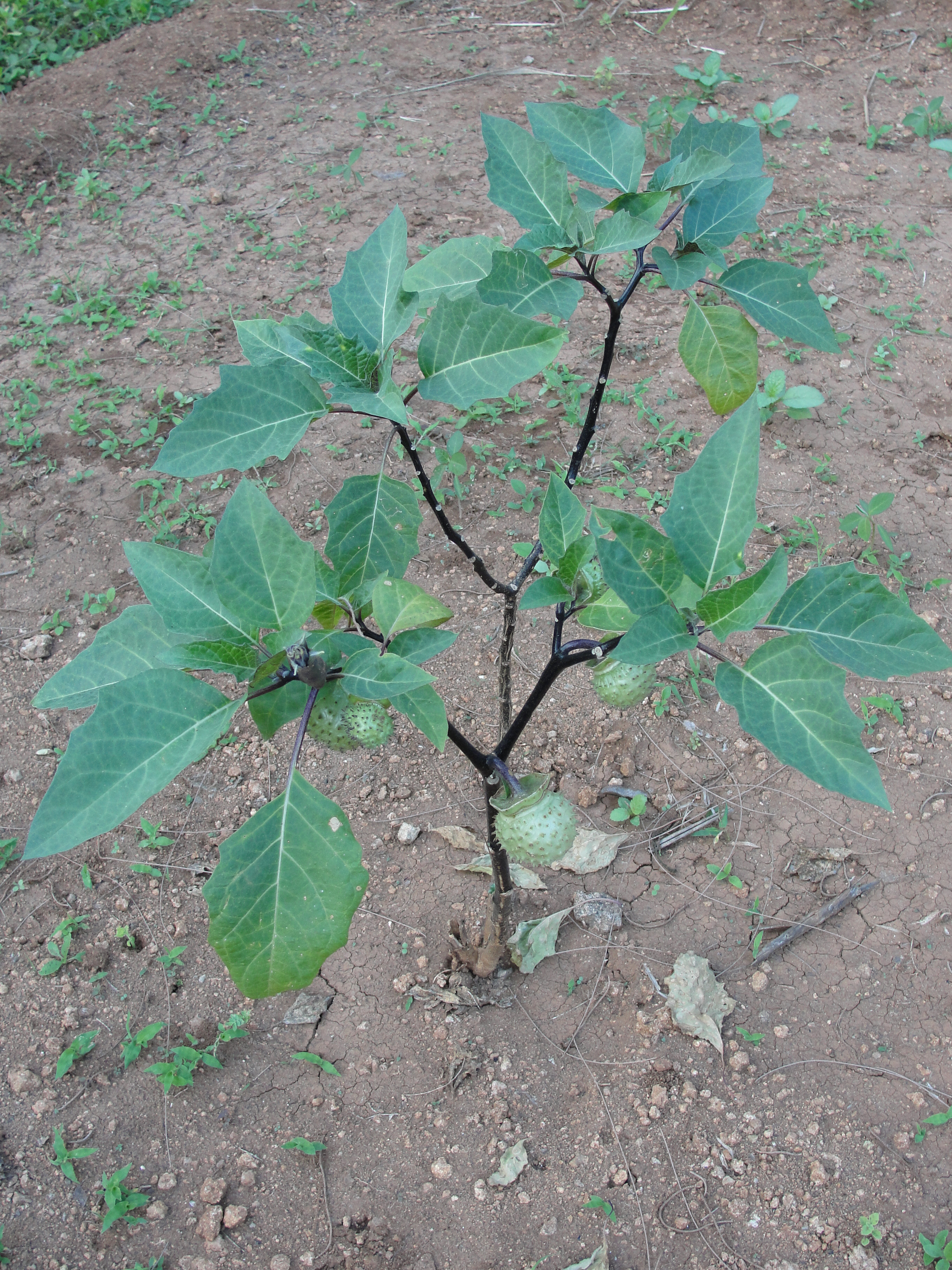
D. metel 'Fastuosa' in flower and fruit.

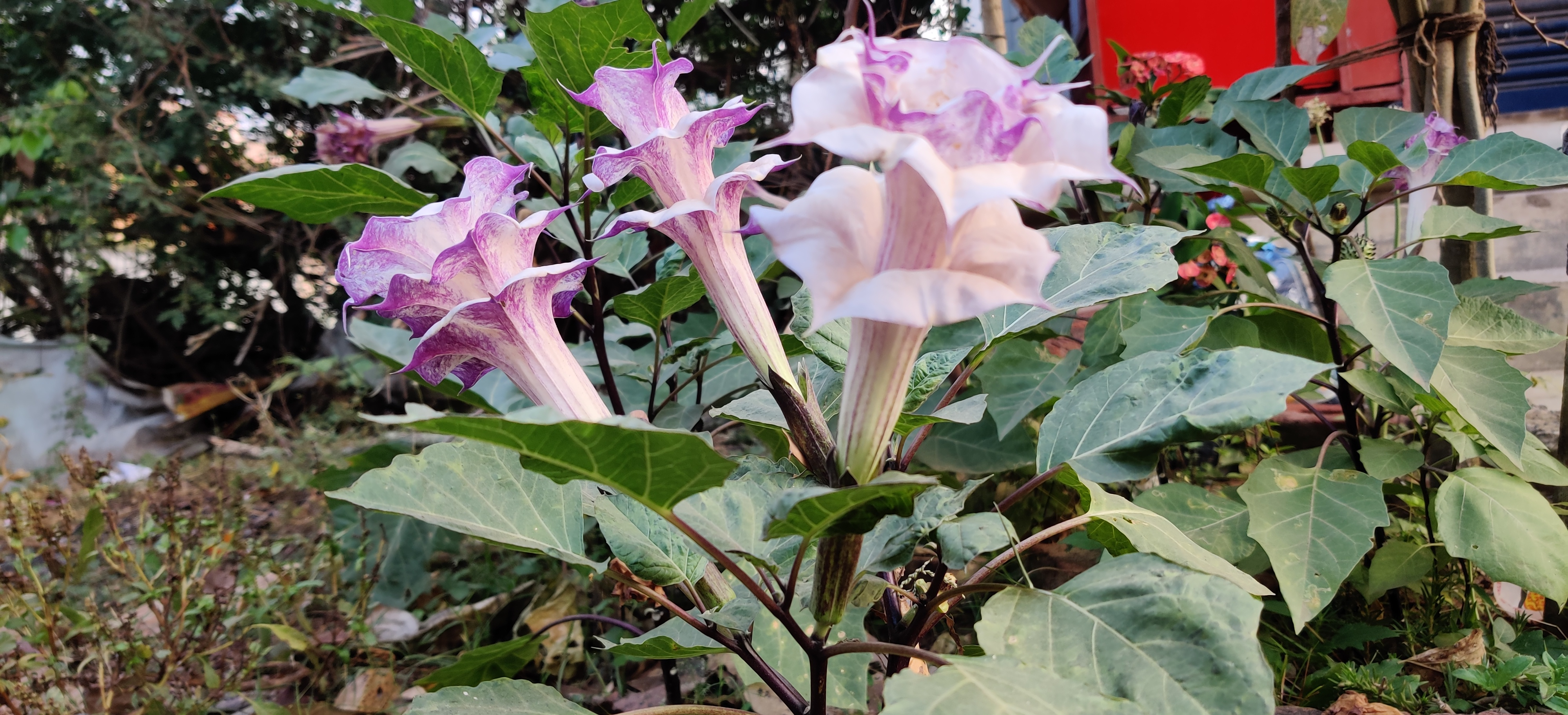
Pale-flowered form of D. metel 'Fastuosa' with particularly well-defined triple corollas, Thimmapuram, Tamil Nadu

== See also ==
- Datumetine
