= Maha Shivaratri =

Festival the Hindu god Shiva

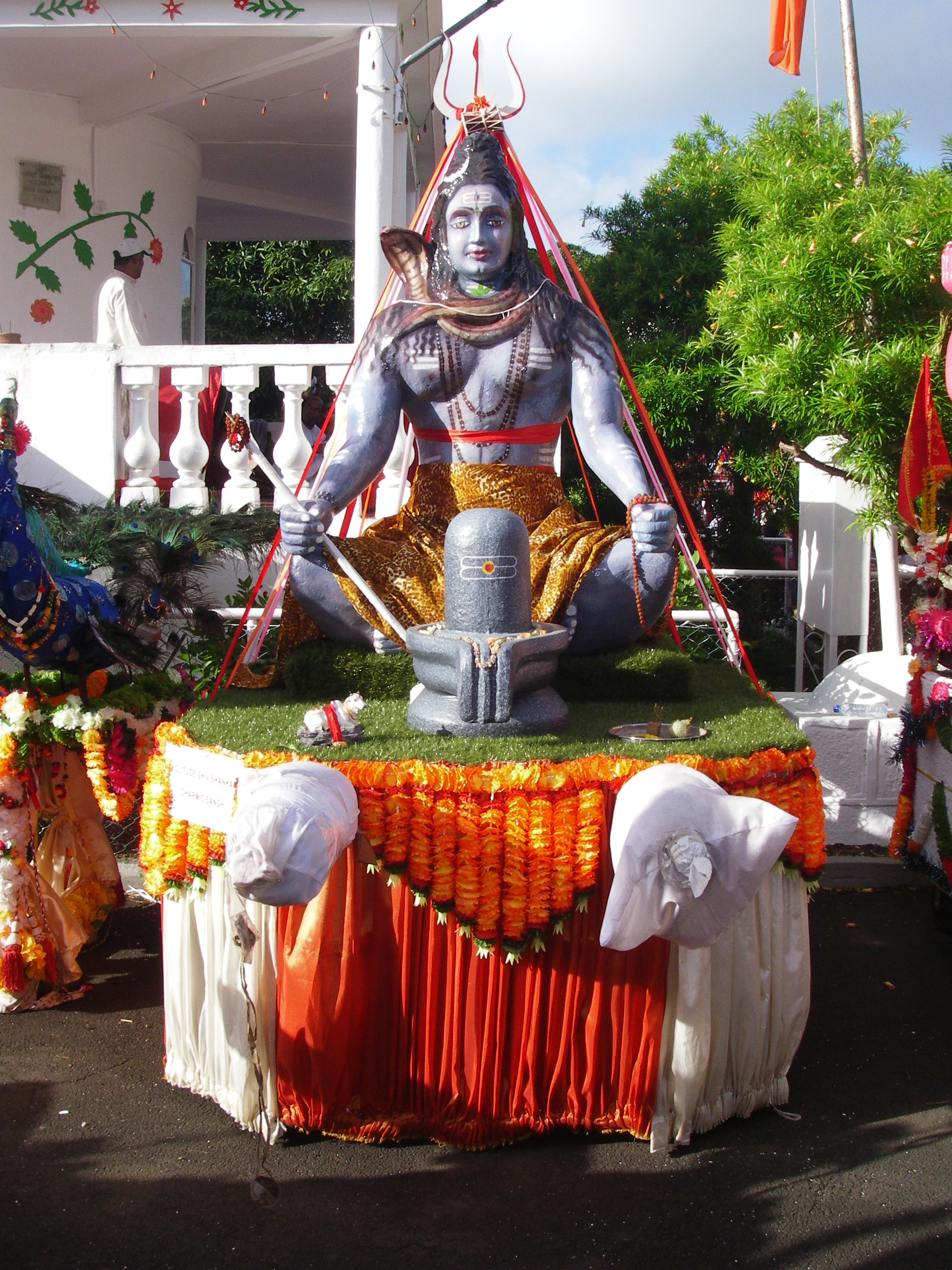
- Meditating Shiva statue on Maha-Shivaratri
- Observed by: Hindus
- Type: Religious
- Significance: Commemoration of the wedding of Shiva and Parvati; Veneration of the Tandava dance of Shiva; Manifestation of the lingam
- Observances: Fasting; Self-study; Jagarana; Lingam puja; Yoga
- Date: Maha Krishna Chaturdashi
- 2027 date: 6 March (Saturday)
- Frequency: Annual

Explanatory note on Hindu festival dates
- The Hindu calendar is lunisolar but most festival dates are specified using the lunar portion of the calendar. A lunar day is uniquely identified by three calendar elements: māsa (lunar month), pakṣa (lunar fortnight) and tithi (lunar day). Furthermore, when specifying the masa, one of two traditions are applicable, viz. amānta / pūrṇimānta. If a festival falls in the waning phase of the moon, these two traditions identify the same lunar day as falling in two different (but successive) masa. A lunar year is shorter than a solar year by about eleven days. As a result, most Hindu festivals occur on different days in successive years on the Gregorian calendar.

Maha Shivaratri is a Hindu festival celebrated annually to worship the deity Shiva, between February and March. According to the Hindu calendar, The festival is observed on the caturdaśī (the 14th lunar day) of kṛṣṇapakṣa (waning fortnight) of the month of Māgha (in the Amānta reckoning of months) or Phālguṇa (in the Pūrṇimānta reckoning of months). The discrepancy is only in the name of the month and the festival is observed on the same lunar night across the regions. The festival commemorates the marriage of Shiva and Parvati, and the occasion of Shiva performing his ritual dance called tandava.

It is a notable festival in Hinduism, marking a remembrance of "overcoming darkness and ignorance" in life and the world. It is observed by remembering Shiva and chanting prayers, fasting, and meditating on ethics and virtues such as honesty, non-injury to others, charity, forgiveness, and the discovery of Shiva. Ardent devotees stay awake throughout this night. Others visit one of the Shiva temples or go on a pilgrimage to the Jyotirlingams. The festival is believed to have originated in 5th century BCE.

In Kashmir Shaivism, the festival is called Har-ratri or phonetically simpler Haerath or Herath by Shiva devotees of the Kashmir region.

== Etymology ==
The term Maha Shivaratri is a compound of three Sanskrit elements: maha (महा) meaning "great", Shiva (शिव), the Hindu deity, and ratri (रात्रि), meaning "night". The literal meaning is "the Great Night of Shiva." The festival is observed annually on the krishna paksha (waning moon) chaturdashi (14th lunar day) of the month of Magha or Phalguna In the Amanta lunar calendar, where a lunar month ends on the new moon day (Amavasiya), the date falls in the month of Magha. In the Purnimanta lunar calendar, where a lunar month ends on the full moon day (Purnima), the same lunar day of Maha Shivaratri is reckoned as occurring in Phalguna. Despite the difference in month name, the festival is observed on the same lunar night across India.

=== Other names ===
In Kashmir, Shivaratri is referred to as Herath (Kashmiri: हेरथ / ہیرَتھ). The name is commonly understood to derive from "Har Ratri" ("Night of Hara"), Hara being a name of Shiva. In the Kashmiri Pandit tradition, the observance of Herath expands beyond a single night and spans approximately twenty-three days, beginning with Hur-e-Okdoh (the first day of the dark fortnight of the Purnimanta month of Phaguna) and concluding on Teel-e-aetham (the eighth day of the bright fortnight of Phagun).

Maha Shivratri is also known as Padmarajarathri (पद्मराजरात्रि), a sacred night dedicated to Shiva, observed with fasting, prayers, and night-long worship by devotees.

== Origins ==
=== Textual origins ===
The origin of Maha Shivaratri is mentioned mainly in Puranic literature. One of the first mentions appears in the Shiva Purana, which links the story of the hunter Gurudruha with Shivaratri. The story of Gurudruha, who is also referred to as Lubdhaka, is later found in the Javanese didactic text Siwaratrikalpa, which is dated to being composed between 1466 and 1478. The festival is also mentioned in the Linga Purana and the Skanda Purana.

=== Archeological origins ===
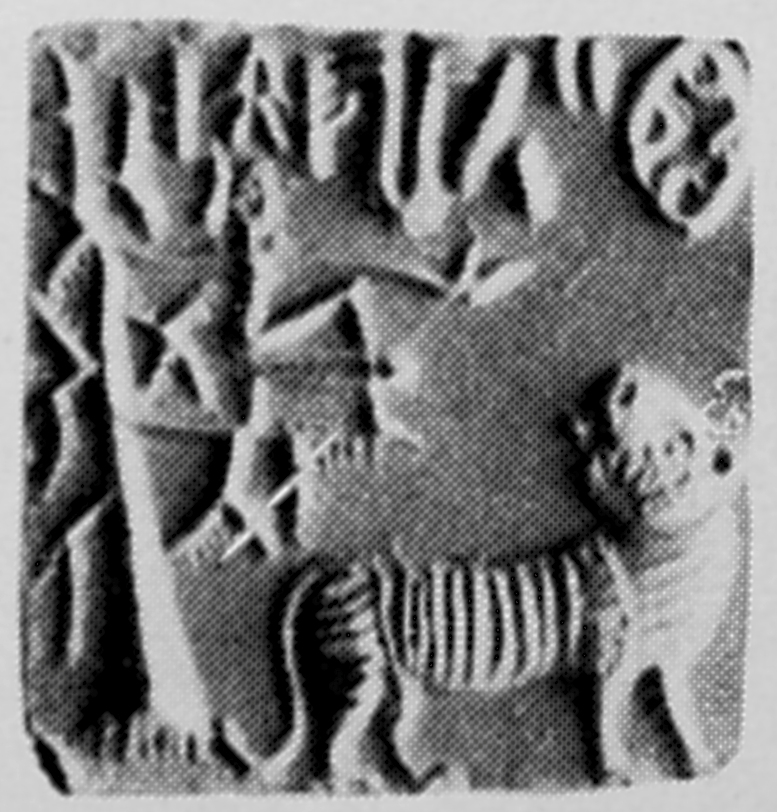
One of eighteen seals depicting the "human and tiger" motif from the Indus Valley Civilization. These seals closely resemble the story of Gurudruha (Lubdhaka) that is associated with Maha Shivaratri.

According to some scholars, the Lubdhaka (hunter) legend associated with Maha Shivaratri may find its roots in the Indus Valley Civilization. Archaeological evidence such as the Pashupati seal has been widely interpreted by researchers as indicating early forms of Shiva or proto-Shaiva worship. Archaeologist Gregory Possehl identified at least eighteen examples of a recurring "human and tiger" motif in Harappan glyptic art from sites including Harappa, Mohenjo-daro, and Chanhu-daro. These seals closely resemble the story of Gurudruha (Lubdhaka) that appears in the Shiva Purana.

Maha Shivaratri is particularly important in the Shaivism tradition of Hinduism. Shivaratri ("Night of Shiva") refers to the monthly observance that falls on the 14th night (chaturdashi) of every lunar fortnight during the waning phase of the moon. Each lunar month therefore contains one Shivaratri. Devotees observe fasting, night vigil (jagarana), and worship of the linga on these days. Thus, Maha Shivaratri may be understood as the "great" or preeminent Shivaratri among the twelve monthly Shivaratris in a lunar year. Unlike most Hindu festivals that are celebrated during the day, Maha Shivaratri is celebrated at night. It is a festival notable for its fasting and meditation on Shiva and an all-night vigil at Shiva temples.

=== Night vigil (jagarana) ===
The celebration includes maintaining a jagarana, an all-night vigil and prayers, because Shaiva Hindus mark this night as "overcoming darkness and ignorance" in one's life and the world through Shiva. In temples, the night is divided into four quarters (praharas), each with its own ritual worship and singing of mantras. Offerings of fruits, leaves, sweets and milk are made to Shiva, some perform all-day fasting with Vedic or Tantric worship of Shiva, and some perform meditative yoga. The injunctions from the Kalanirnaya of Madhvacharya are also followed during the jagarana.

=== Fasting ===
In Shaivism, fasting is traditionally associated with Shiva worship. It is customary for the devotees of Shiva not to eat anything until they worship him and make him offerings. On most of the days, devotees do not fast for a whole day because the worship is performed in the early morning. However, on the day of Maha Shivaratri, they wait because the worship continues late into the night.

During the fast, Iodized salt is completely avoided, and instead, food is prepared using rock salt or unrefined sea salt (sendha namak). Those fasting may do "nirjala vrat," (fasting from all food and water), or fast from meat, eating only fruits and milk during the day. Eating food made from rice, wheat, or pulses is also discouraged. Tamasik foods such as onion, garlic, and alcohol are also avoided as they are believed to increase lethargy. The fast is broken on the next day (chaturdashi) after taking a bath.

=== Puja and abhisheka ===
Ritual worship (puja) of the lingam is the central religious act of Maha Shivaratri. Devotees offer water, milk, yogurt, honey, ghee, and other sacred substances in the ritual known as abhisheka. Coconut water is generally avoided for the abhisheka, as it becomes "nirmalaya" (leftover of an offering) after being offered, and therefore becomes unconsumable. More than 49 types of plant species from 34 families are used as offerings to the deity throughout various regions of India on Maha Shivaratri. However, leaves of the bilva (Aegle marmelos), considered sacred to Shiva, are the most commonly offered plants. In Kashmir, walnuts are soaked in water in earthen pots and buried in the ground for four to five days before Shivaratri. On the day of the festival, they are retrieved, offered to Lord Shiva, and distributed to devotees as prasada.

=== Fairs (Melas) ===
Many regions in India and Nepal observe Maha Shivaratri not only through temple worship and fasting, but also through large public fairs (melas) and pilgrimage gatherings at important Shaiva sacred sites. One of the most prominent gatherings takes place at the Pashupatinath Temple in Kathmandu, where Maha Shivaratri is among the largest annual religious festivals. Thousands of devotees, including ascetics and sadhus from across South Asia, assemble at the temple complex to perform night vigils, offer bilva leaves, and participate in ritual bathing in the nearby Bagmati River. The Pashupatinath Temple complex, a UNESCO World Heritage Site, attracts hundreds of thousands of pilgrims during Maha Shivaratri, making it one of the largest annual religious gatherings in Nepal. The Mandi Shivaratri Fair held in the town of Mandi is also famous as a venue for Maha Shivaratri celebrations. It is believed that all gods and goddesses of the area, said to number more than 200, assemble here on the day of Maha Shivaratri.

=== Dance (Nrutya) ===
The significance of the dance tradition to this festival has historical roots. Maha Shivaratri has served as a historic confluence of artists for annual dance festivals at major Hindu temples such as at Konark, Khajuraho, Pattadakal, Modhera and Chidambaram. This event is called Natyanjali, literally "worship through dance", at the Chidambaram temple which is famous for its sculpture depicting all dance mudras in the ancient Hindu text of performance arts called Natya Shastra. Similarly, at Khajuraho Shiva temples, a major fair and dance festival on Maha Shivaratri, involving Shaiva pilgrims camped over miles around the temple complex, was documented by Alexander Cunningham in 1864.

=== Pilgrimage ===
On Maha Shivaratri, many devotees perform pilgrimages to the major Jyotirlinga Shiva temples of India, such as Varanasi and Somanatha. They also serve as sites for fairs and special events. In Tamil Nadu, pilgrimages are also made to the Annamalaiyar temple located in Tiruvannamalai district. The special process of worship on this day is Girivalam or Giri Pradakshina, a 14-kilometer barefoot walk around Shiva's temple on top of the hill. A huge lamp of oil and camphor is lit on the hilltop at sunset, not to be confused with Karthigai Deepam. A ritual marathon is undertaken by the devotees to the 12 Shiva shrines in the district of Kanyakumari on the day of Shivaratri called Sivalaya Ottam. During this period, the rope used for hoisting the temple flag is coated with turmeric powder. In Punjab, Shobha Yatras would be organised by various Hindu organisations in different cities. It is a grand festival for Punjabi Hindus.

== Legends ==
Maha Shivaratri is mentioned in several Puranas, particularly the Skanda Purana, Linga Purana, and Padma Purana. These medieval era Shaiva texts present different versions associated with this festival, such as fasting, and offering reverence to a lingam—an emblematic figure of Shiva.

Different legends describe the significance of Maha Shivaratri. According to one legend in the Shaivism tradition, this is the night when Shiva performs the heavenly dance of creation, preservation and destruction. The chanting of hymns, the reading of Shiva scriptures and the chorus of devotees joins this cosmic dance and remembers Shiva's presence everywhere. According to another legend, this is the night when Shiva and Parvati got married. It is also believed that on this particular day, Shiva gulped the Halahala produced during the Samudra Manthana and held it in his neck, which bruised and turned blue. As a result, he acquired the epithet Nilakantha.

=== The Lingodbhava legend ===
The Linga Purana describes another legend known as Lingodbhava (the emergence of the linga) in connection with Maha Shivaratri. In this account, Brahma and Vishnu dispute their supremacy. To settle the debate, a luminous pillar of fire suddenly appeared in front of them. This event was known as lingodbhava (the birth of the Linga). Brahma took the form of a swan and ascended, trying to find its top, while Vishnu took the form of a boar and descended, seeking its bottom. After thousands of years of fruitless search, both conceded that neither could find an end. At that moment, Shiva emerged from within the flame, and the first Linga was born. The day Shiva appeared and declared his eternal nature is believed to be the day of Maha Shivaratri.

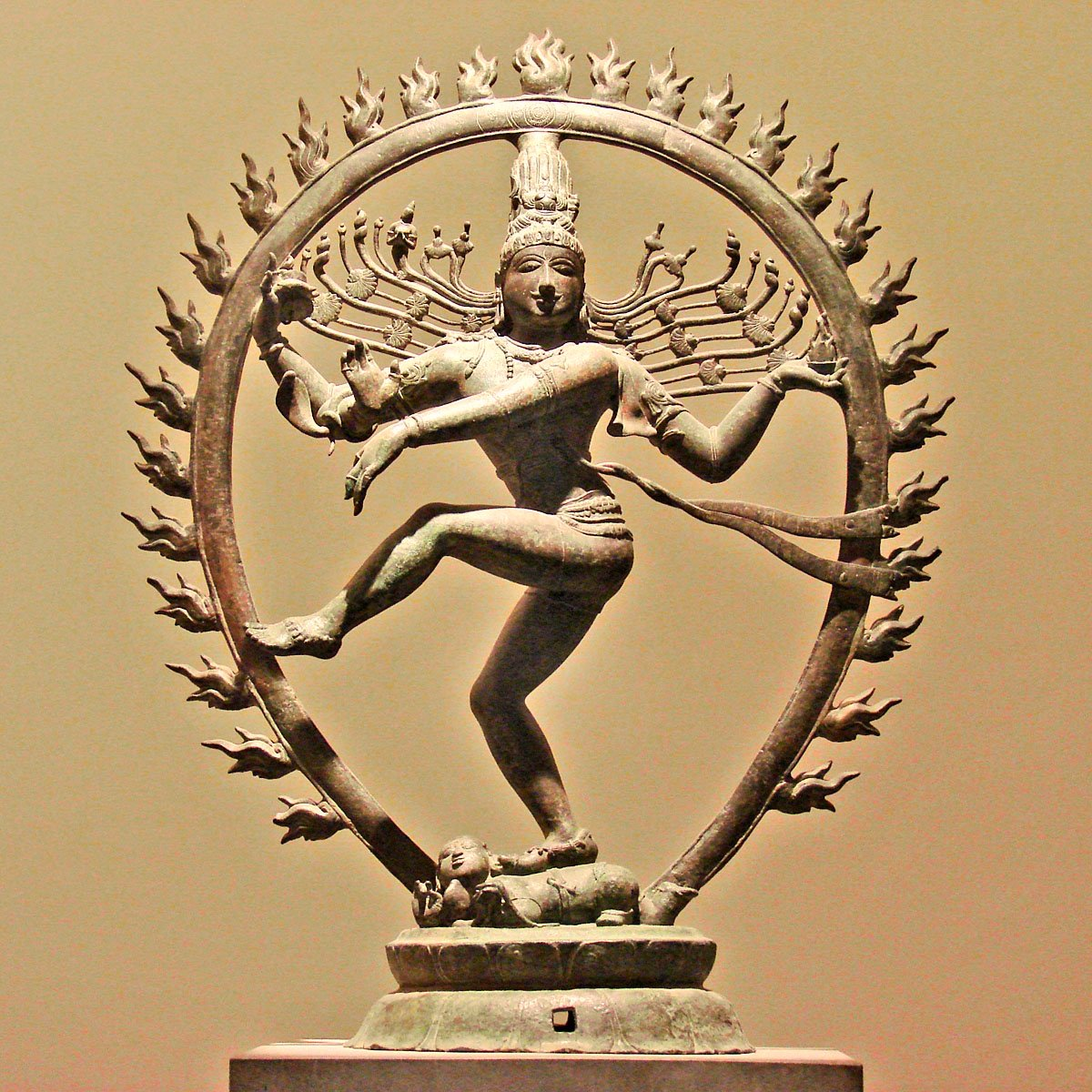
Many legends explain the significance of Maha Shivaratri, one being it is the night of Shiva's dance(Tandava)

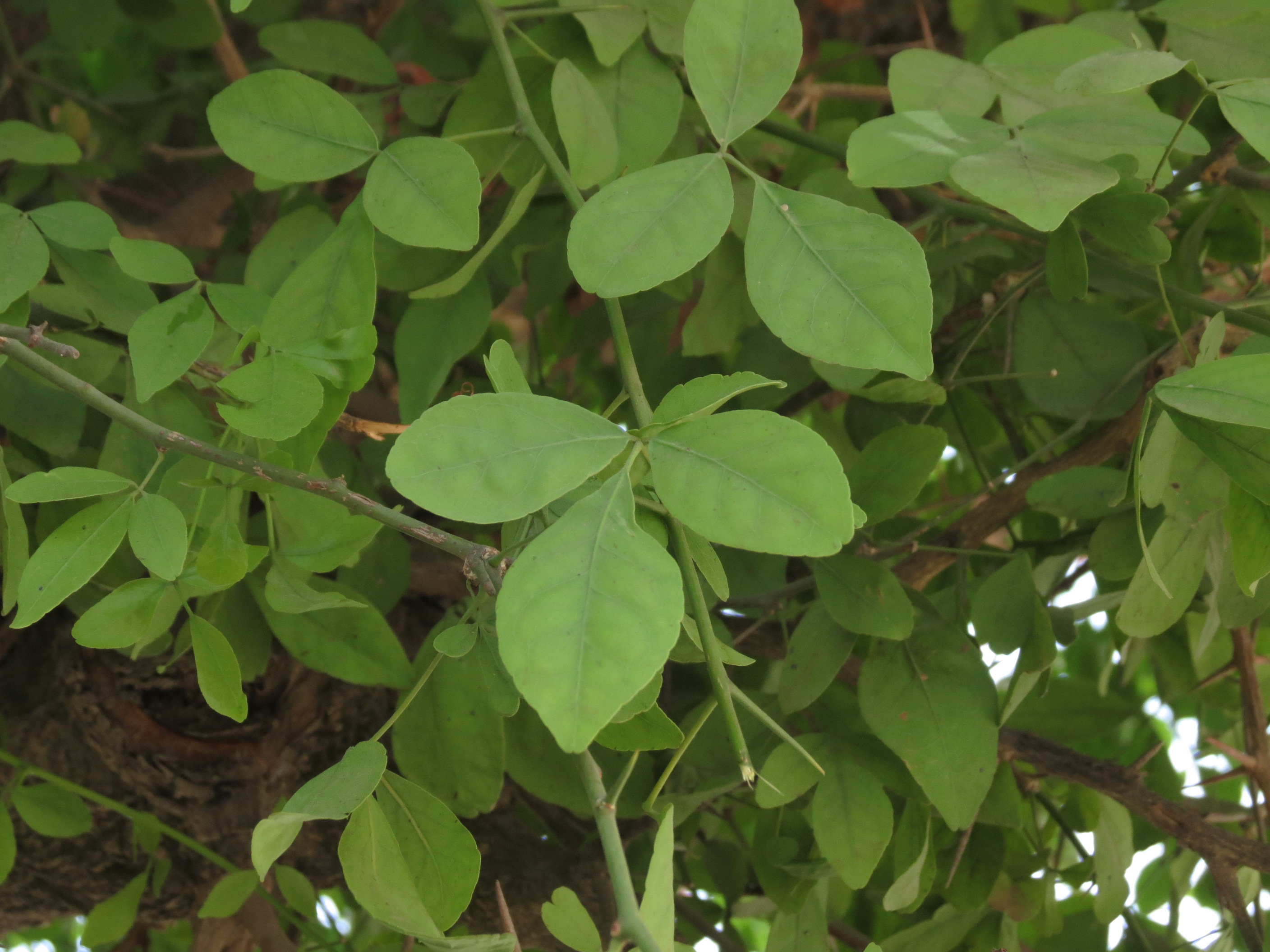
Bilva (Aegle marmelos) leaves mentioned in the Legend of Gurudruha and traditionally offered to Shiva during Maha Shivaratri

=== The legend of Gurudruha ===
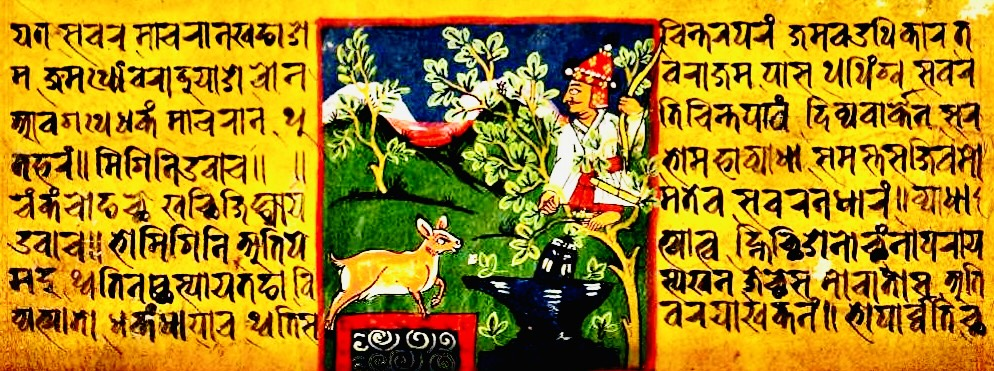
A Newar-language manuscript of the legend of Gurudruha, from Nepal

The Shiva Purana contains the popular and detailed story of a forest hunter named Gurudruha (also called Lubdhaka in Balinese texts), which narrates one of the earliest textual explanations for the ritual practice of bilipatra (bilva) leaf offerings during Maha Shivaratri. On one Maha Shivaratri night, Gurudruha, a hunter with no formal religious background, went to the forest to hunt and bring home food for his parents. To escape the threat of wild animals, he climbed a bilva tree. During the first quarter of the night, a hind deer came to drink from the lake. Gurudruha aimed his bow at her. The frightened deer pleaded for her life, explaining that she had young fawns at home and requesting permission to entrust them to her husband before returning to face death. After some hesitation, he agreed. While waiting for the deer to return and to keep himself awake the whole night, he plucked bilva leaves and dropped them to the forest floor. Unknown to Gurudruha, a lingam rested directly beneath the tree. When dawn arrived, thousands of leaves lay upon the lingam.

At dawn, the deer returned with her family and told the hunter that if he wished to kill her, he would also have to take their lives. As he raised his bow once more, additional bilva leaves fell upon the lingam. The accumulated punya (spiritual merit) from the worship he had unknowingly performed throughout the night had destroyed his sins and transformed his heart. Thus, he released the deer. Pleased by Gurudruha's accidental vigil and devotion, Shiva appeared before him and granted a boon. He declared that the hunter would be reborn as the king of the town of Shrungaverapura, and that Rama would visit his home and ultimately grant him liberation. In his next life, Gurudruha was born as Guha.

== Global worship ==
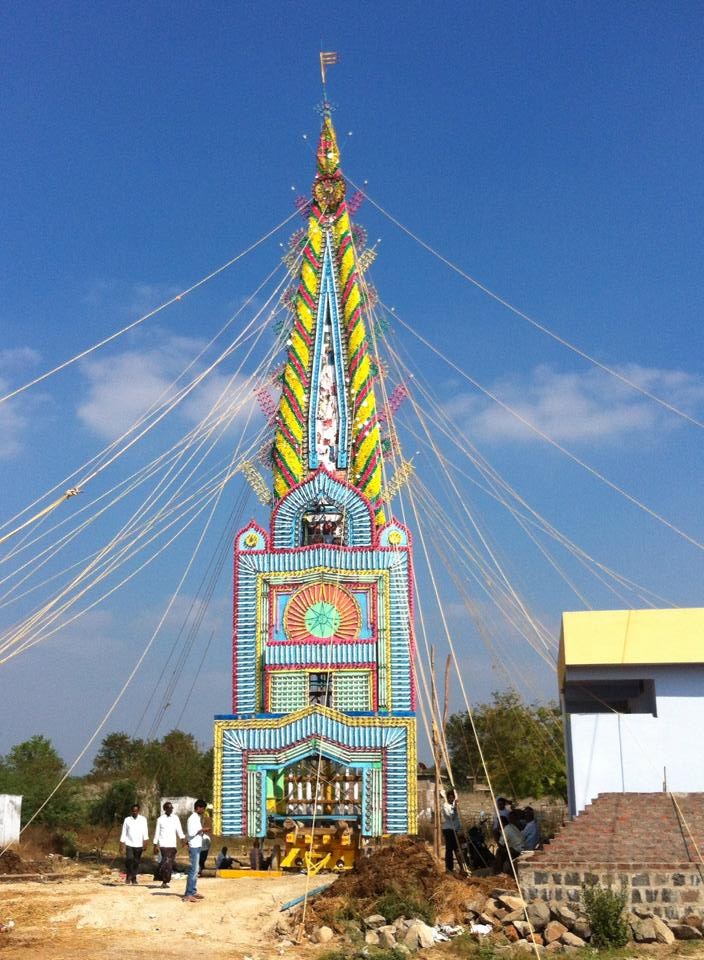
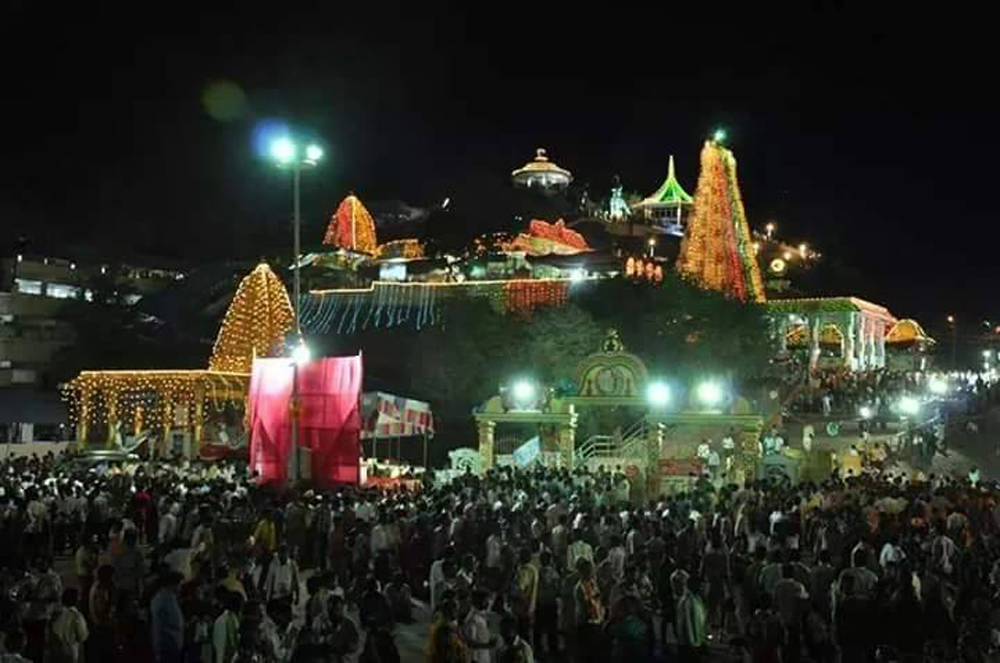
Mahashivaratri Celebrations of Kotappakonda (Palnadu, Andhra Pradesh) observed at night, usually in lighted temples or specially prepared prabha (above).

=== Nepal ===
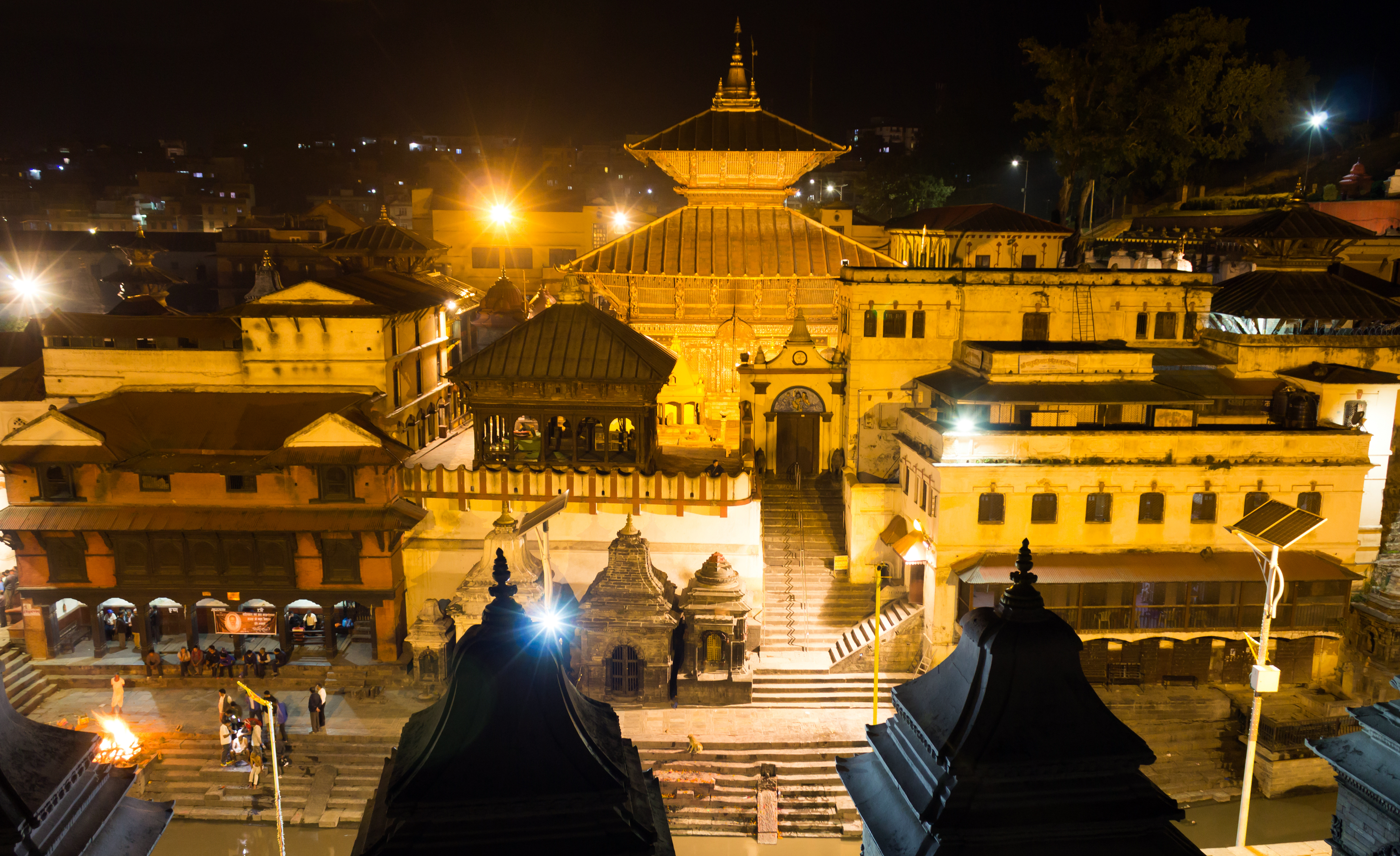
Pashupatinath Temple

Maha Shivaratri is a national holiday in Nepal and celebrated widely in temples all over the country, especially in the Pashupatinath temple. Thousands of devotees visit the famous Shiva Shakti Peetham nearby as well. Maha Shivaratri is celebrated as Nepali Army Day amid a spectacular ceremony held at the Army Pavilion, Tundikhel. Crowds of sadhus and saints travel to Pashupatinath Temple located in Kathmandu from all of Nepal and neighbouring India to celebrate the day and perform puja on this day.

=== Pakistan ===
In Pakistan, Maha Shivaratri is observed by Hindu communities at several historic temple sites, including the Katas Raj Temples in Punjab. The festival is typically celebrated for one day and one night. In 2006, approximately 300 Indian pilgrims attended the festival at the site, and subsequent years saw participation by both Indian and Pakistani Hindus. In 2010 and 2011, around 2,000 Pakistani Hindus from various regions reportedly gathered at Katas Raj for Shivaratri observances. In 2005, Lal Krishna Advani visited the temple complex and publicly expressed concern over its deteriorated condition. The site is open to the public only during Shivaratri celebrations, with access restricted by the government during the rest of the year.

Another major temple where Shivaratri is celebrated in Pakistan is the Shree Ratneshwar Mahadev Temple in Karachi whose Shivaratri festival is attended by 25,000 people. On the Shivaratri night, Hindus in Karachi fast and visit the temple. Later, devotees from the Chanesar Goth come to the temple carrying water from the holy river Ganges, in order to bathe the idol of Shiva. Puja is performed until 5 am, followed by an aarti. Devotees then walk barefoot with women carrying a pooja thali containing flowers, incense sticks, rice, coconut and a diya to the sea after which they are free to break their fast. Breakfast is served in the temple kitchen.

=== Caribbean ===
Maha Shivaratri is the main Hindu festival among the Shaiva Hindu diaspora from Nepal and India. In Indo-Caribbean communities, thousands of Hindus spend the festival night in over four hundred temples across multiple countries, offering special jhalls (milk and curd, flowers, sugarcane and sweets) to Shiva. In 2026, the PM of Trinidad and Tobago, Kamla Persad-Bissessar, celebrated Maha Shivaratri by visiting nine Hindu temples across her constituency overnight, joining devotees in the night vigil.

=== Oman ===
In Oman, Maha Shivaratri is observed by the Hindu diaspora at the historic Motishwar Mandir in the Muttrah area of Muscat. The temple, dedicated to Shiva, was built in 1909 by the Bhatia merchant community from Sindh and Gujarat, whose trading networks had been present in Muscat since the early 16th century. The complex contains shrines to Adi Motishwar Mahadev and Hanuman, and is one of the oldest Hindu temples in the Persian Gulf region. During Maha Shivaratri, more than 20,000 devotees gather at the temple to perform prayers and night-long worship dedicated to Shiva.

=== Outside the Indian subcontinent ===
In Mauritius, Hindus go on pilgrimage to Ganga Talao, a crater-lake.

Maha Shivaratri is known as Siwa Ratri in Indonesia and Hindus in Bali and Java celebrate it as a major festival.

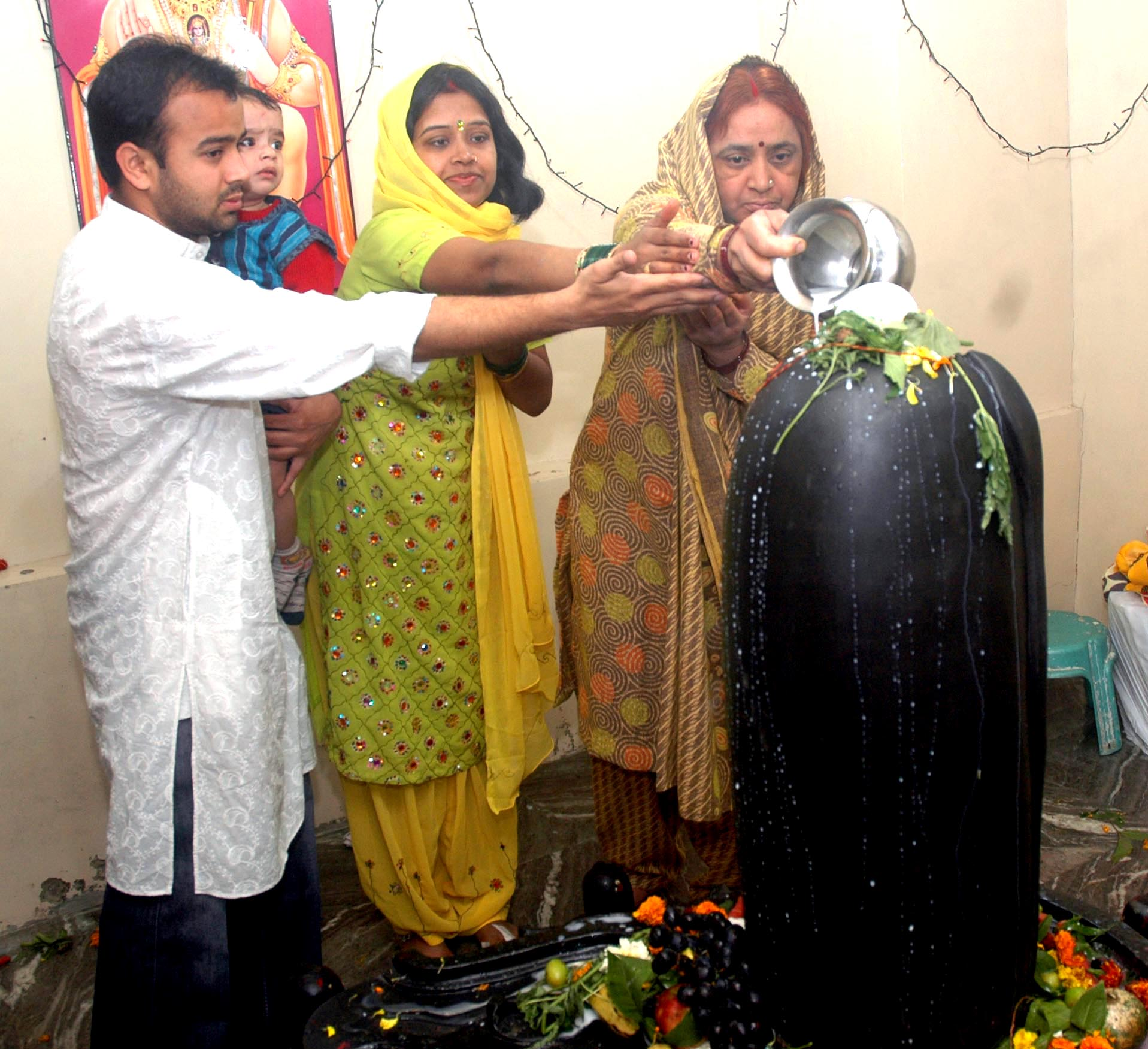
A family worshipping Shiva Linga during fasting period.

== See also ==
- Pradosha
- Rudraksha
- Vibhuti
- Rudra
- Linga
- Rudrabhisheka
- Jalabhisheka
