= Neelakanta =

Neelakanta or Nilakanta may refer to:

- Nilakanta (Hinduism), also known as Shiva
- Neelakanta (film), 2006 Indian Kannada language film
- Nilakanta (2026 film), an Indian Telugu-language film
- Neelakanta (director), Indian Telugu film director.
- Nilakantha Somayaji (1444–1544), Indian mathematician and astronomer
- Nilakanta Sri Ram (1889–1973), Indian theosophist leader
- K. A. Nilakanta Sastri (1892–1975), Indian historian and Dravidologist
- T. N. Srinivasan (1933–2018), Indian economist

== See also ==
- Nilkanth (disambiguation)
