= Nilkanth (disambiguation) =

Nilkanth, Neelkanth, or Nīlakaṇtha (lit. 'blue throat') is another name or characteristic of the Hindu deity Shiva. It may also refer to:

== People ==
- Mahipatram Rupram Nilkanth, Gujarati educationist, reformer, novelist and biographer
- Neelakantha Chaturdhara, seventeenth-century commentator on the Mahābhārata
- Neelkanth Ganjoo, judge in the Jammu and Kashmir High Court, India
- Neelkanth Tiwari, Minister of State in Government of Uttar Pradesh in Yogi Adityanath ministry
- Nilakantha Daivajna, 16th-century astronomer-astrologer
- Nilakantha Somayaji, mathematician of the Kerala school
- Nilkanth Singh Munda, member of the Legislative Assembly of India from Khunti constituency
- Ramanbhai Nilkanth, Gujarati writer
- Swaminarayan, known as Nilkanth Varni during his teenage years and founder of the Swaminarayan Sampradaya religious movement
- Vidyagauri Nilkanth, Gujarati social reformer, educationist, and writer

== Animals ==
- Indian roller, a bird of the family Coraciidae, known as nilkanth in Hindustani
- Nilakantha (spider), a genus of jumping spiders

== Places ==
- Nilkantha (mountain), a peak of the Garhwal division of the Himalayas, in Uttarakhand, India
- Nilkantha, Nepal, in Dhading District, Bagmati Province

== Other uses ==
- Nilakanta (Hinduism), the specific epithet used by Shiva
- Neelkanth (film), a 2012 Indian Gujarati film
- Nīlakantha dhāranī, a Mahayana Buddhist mantra

== See also ==
- Bluethroat, a species of songbird
