= Kshira Sagara =

Divine ocean in Hindu mythology

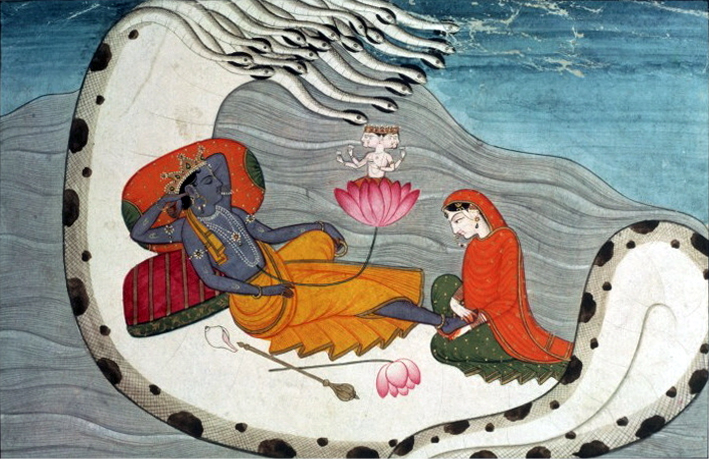
Vishnu and Lakshmi on Shesha over the Kshira Sagara - The Ocean of Milk, ca 1870

The Kshira Sagara (Sanskrit: क्षीरसागर, romanized: Kṣīrasāgara, lit. 'Ocean of Milk') is an ocean in Hindu cosmology. It is the abode where Vishnu reclines upon the serpent-king Shesha alongside his consort, Lakshmi.

In the Samudra Manthana legend of the Puranas, the devas and asuras churned this ocean for a millennium to obtain amrita (the nectar of immortality). It is listed as the fifth of the seven oceans from the centre, surrounding the continent of Krauncha.

== Etymology ==
The "Ocean of Milk" is the English translation of the Sanskrit terms kṣīroda, kṣīrābdhi or kṣīrasāgara, from kṣīra "milk" and -uda, sāgara "water, ocean" or abdhi "ocean."

The term varies across Indic languages, referred to as Khir Śagôr in Bengali, Pālāḻi in Malayalam, Pāṟkaṭal in Tamil, and Pāla Samudram in Telugu.

== The Churning of the Ocean ==
The Kshira Sagara is the site of the legend of the Samudra Manthana, the churning of the cosmic ocean. At the suggestion of Vishnu, the devas and asuras churned the primeval ocean in order to obtain amrita, the elixir of immortality. To churn the ocean, they used the serpent-king, Vasuki as the churning rope. They used Mount Mandara as a churning pole and placed it on the back of Kurma, an avatar of Vishnu. As the devas and asuras churned the ocean, the poison halahala emerged from its depth and enveloped the universe with its poisonous fumes. The devas and asuras asked Shiva for help and he swallowed the poison into his throat. His consort, the goddess Parvati, tried to prevent the poison from spreading to the rest of his body and the strength of the poison turned Shiva's neck blue, thereby earning him the epithet of Nilakantha (the blue-throated one).

According to the Mahabharata, a number of ratnas (treasures) emerged during the churning of Kshira Sagara: Kamadhenu, the cow of plenty, Varuni, the goddess of wine, the tree Parijata, the apsaras, the crescent moon, the poison halahala, and Dhanvantari (the physician of the devas), holding a cup of amrita in his hand. He was followed by Lakshmi, the goddess of prosperity, the horse Uchchaishravas, the gemstone Kaustubha, the elephant Airavata, the wish-granting tree Kalpavriksha, and the conch Panchajanya. The Puranas include the emergence of Alakshmi, the goddess of misfortune, Riddhi and Siddhi, Pushkara, and a number of botanical substances.

When the amrita finally emerged along with several other treasures, the devas and asuras fought over it. However, Vishnu, in his form of the enchantress Mohini, managed to manipulate the asuras into allowing him to be the one to distribute the elixir, upon which he offered it only to the devas. Svarbhanu, an asura, disguised himself as a deva in order to partake of the amrita. Surya (the sun-god) and Chandra (the moon-god) alerted Vishnu of this deception. Vishnu then decapitated Svarbhanu after the asura's consumption of the elixir, leaving his head and decapitated body immortal. Later, his head became known as Rahu and the beheaded part became known as Ketu.

The churning of the ocean is told in several ancient texts, notably in the Valmiki's Ramayana Canto 45 and in the Mahabharata.

== Literature ==
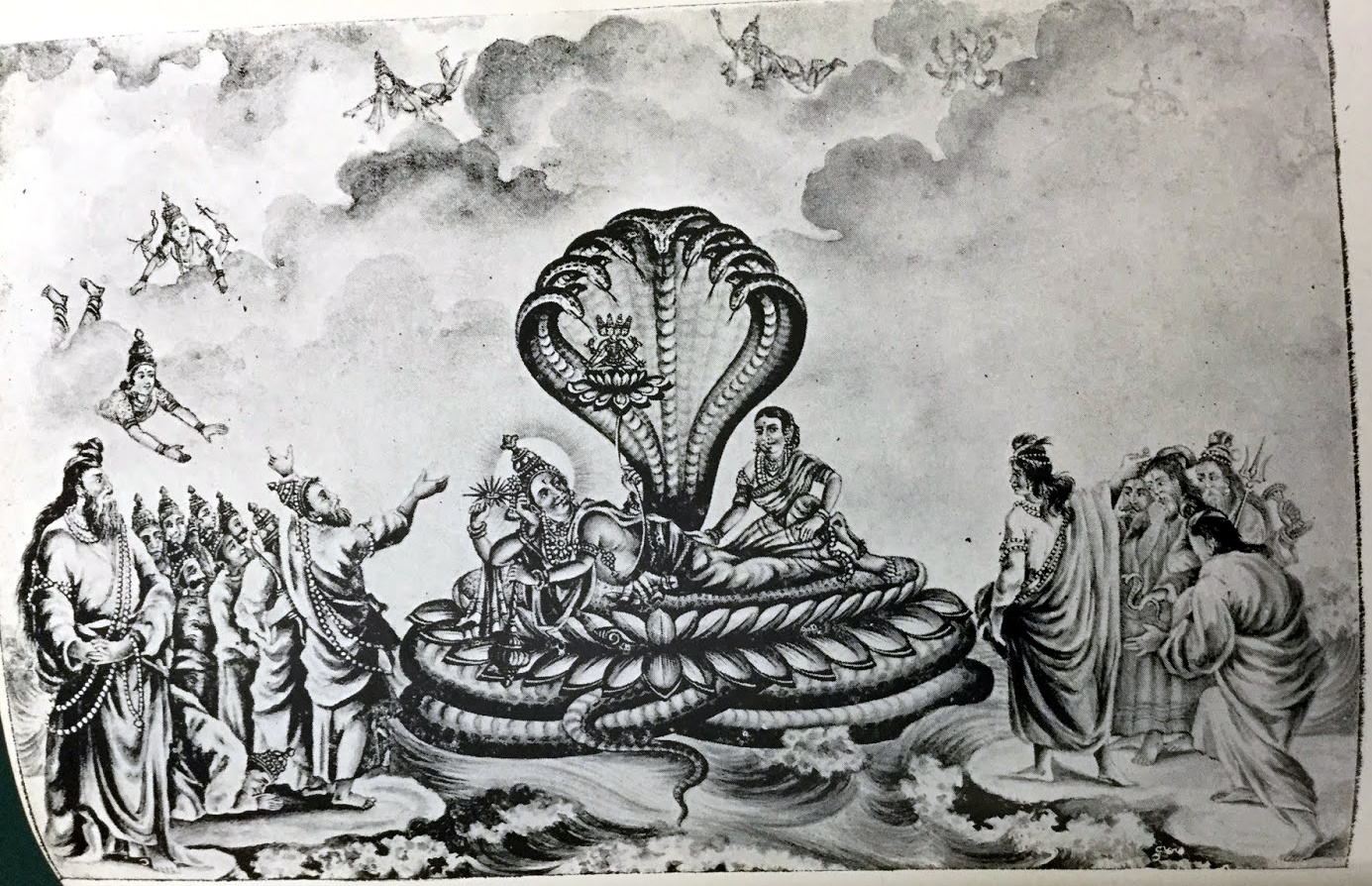
Brahma emerges from Mahavishnu in the Ocean of Milk

=== Vishnu Purana ===
The Vishnu Purana describes the origin of Lakshmi from the Sea of Milk:

The sea of milk in person presented her with in wreath of never-fading flowers; and the artist of the gods (Visvakarma) decorated her person with heavenly ornaments. Thus bathed, attired, and adorned, the goddess, in the view of the celestials, cast herself upon the breast of Hari; and there reclining, turned her eyes upon the deities, who were inspired with rapture by her gaze. Not so the Daityas, who, with Vipracitti at their head, were filled with indignation, as Visnu turned away from them, and they were abandoned by the goddess of prosperity (Laksml).

— Vishnu Purana, Book 1, Chapter 9

=== Tiruvaymoli ===
The Ocean of Milk (Tiruppāṟkaṭal) is mentioned in Tiruvaymoli, a Vaishnava work of Tamil literature:

Praise the lotus-eyed Lord
Who is the form of the three gods
Who is the first among the first three
Who removes curses
Who lies on the deep ocean
Who is the Lord of the divine beings
Whose bow burnt the beautiful Lanka and
Who destroys our sins.

— Nammalvar, Tiruvaymoli, Verse 3.6.2

=== Devi Bhagavata Purana ===
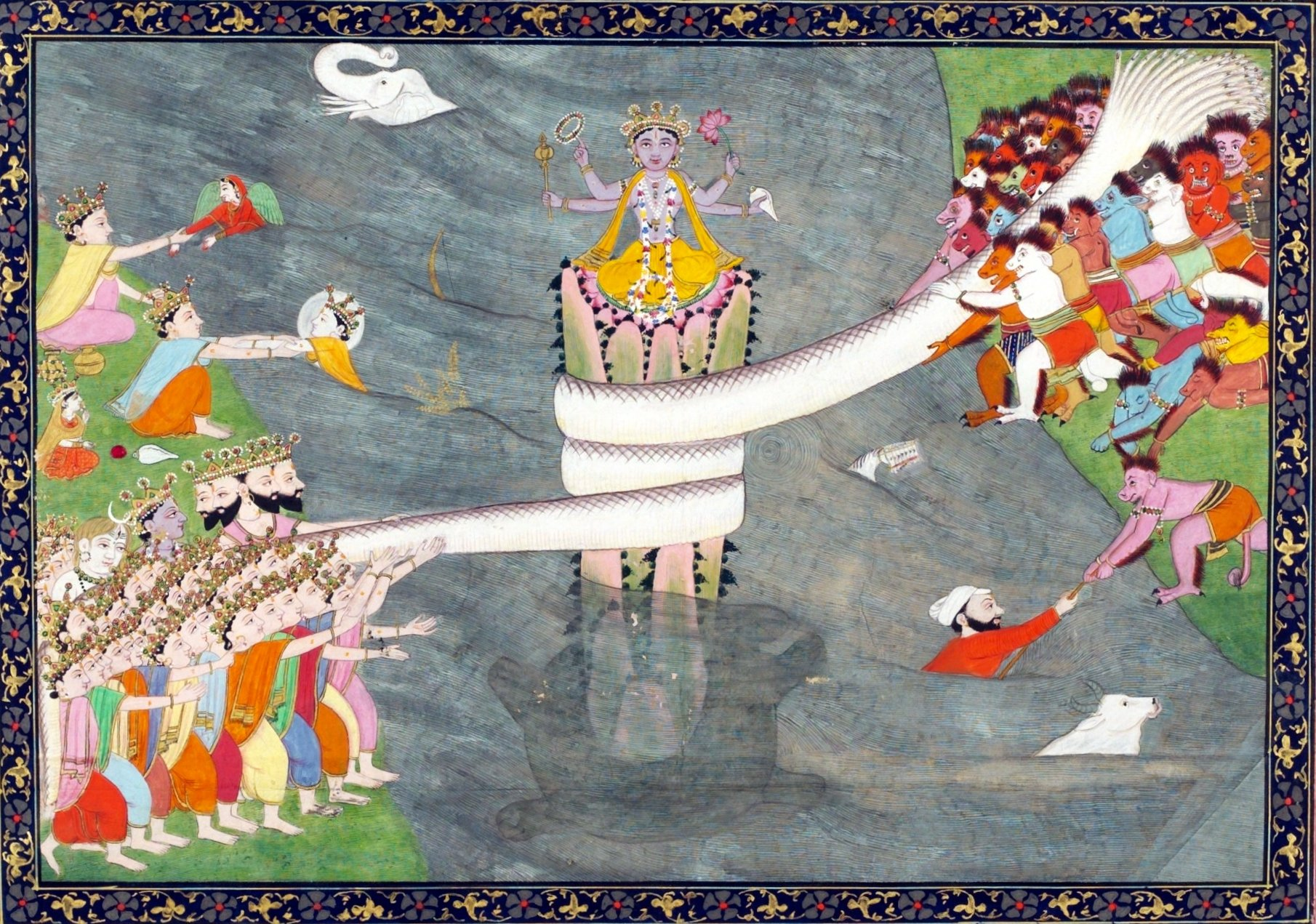
Kurma avatar of Vishnu, below Mount Mandara, with Vasuki wrapped around it, during Samudra Manthana, the churning of the Ocean of Milk, c. 1870

The Devi Bhagavata Purana also refers to the Ocean of Milk in its verses:

The Bhagavan Hari sometimes resides in Vaikuntha, sometimes resides in the sea of milk and enjoys pleasures, sometimes fights the powerful Danavas, sometimes performs extensive sacrificial ceremonies sometimes performs severe asceticism and sometimes takes to deep sleep under the guidance of Yoga Maya. Thus He never becomes free and independent.

— Devi Bhagavata Purana, Chapter 20, Verses 12 - 14

== Abodes ==
- Vaikuntha, covered with water in the material world, which is an inestimable distance away in the direction of the Makara Rashi (Shravana Zodiac) or the Capricorn Constellation. Upon this realm is a place called Vedavati, where Vishnu resides.
- On the island known as Svetadvipa, there is an Ocean of Milk, and in the midst of that ocean, is a place called Airavatipura, where Aniruddha lies on Ananta.

Cosmologically, the dvipas (islands) and sagaras (seas) depict the entire cosmos, though in cosmography, all the dvipas and sagaras are shown to lie in the Southern Hemisphere. In some of the satvata-tantras there is a description of the nine varshas and the predominating deity worshipped in each:

1. Vasudeva
2. Sankarshana
3. Pradyumna
4. Aniruddha
5. Narayana
6. Narasimha
7. Hayagriva
8. Varaha
9. Parashurama

Paramatma, the Supersoul, in the heart of all avatars that exist in the material universe live in the Kshira Sagara. According to some Vaishnava traditions, the Paramatma is Ksirodakasayi Vishnu – who is in every atom and heart of all 8 400 000 kinds of material bodies, as the soul in each heart called atma, which in essence is the same as Paramatma.

In the Garga Samhita, the Kshira Sagara is personified as Nagalakshmi, the consort of Shesha.

== See also ==
- Vaikuntha
- Narayana
- Ksirodakasayi Vishnu
- Paramatma
