= Varsani =

Varsani may refer to:

== People ==
- Mahendra Varsani (born 1989), Indian producer
- Rajesh Varsani (born 1982), Indian-born Kenyan cricketer

== Other uses ==
- Relfo Ltd v Varsani, law case
