= Munchirai =

Town in Tamil Nadu, India

- town
- Country: India
- State: Tamil Nadu
- District: Kanyakumari

Languages
  - Official: Tamil
  - Spoken: Tamil, Malayalam
- Time zone: UTC+5:30 (IST)

Munchirai is a block or panchayat Union of Kanyakumari district, India. It is one among the nine administrative divisions of the district of Kanyakumari. It is famous for the Sivalaya Ottam as its starting point. The current president of the Munchirai Panchayat is C.Rajeswari . It includes the following 11 Village Panchayats:

1. Adaikkakuzhi
2. Choozhal
3. Kulappuram
4. Mankad
5. Munchirai
6. Nadaikavu
7. Thoothoor
8. Vavarai
9. Vilathurai
10. Painkulam
11. Methukummal
