= Mount Mandara =

Sacred mountain in the Hindu Puranas

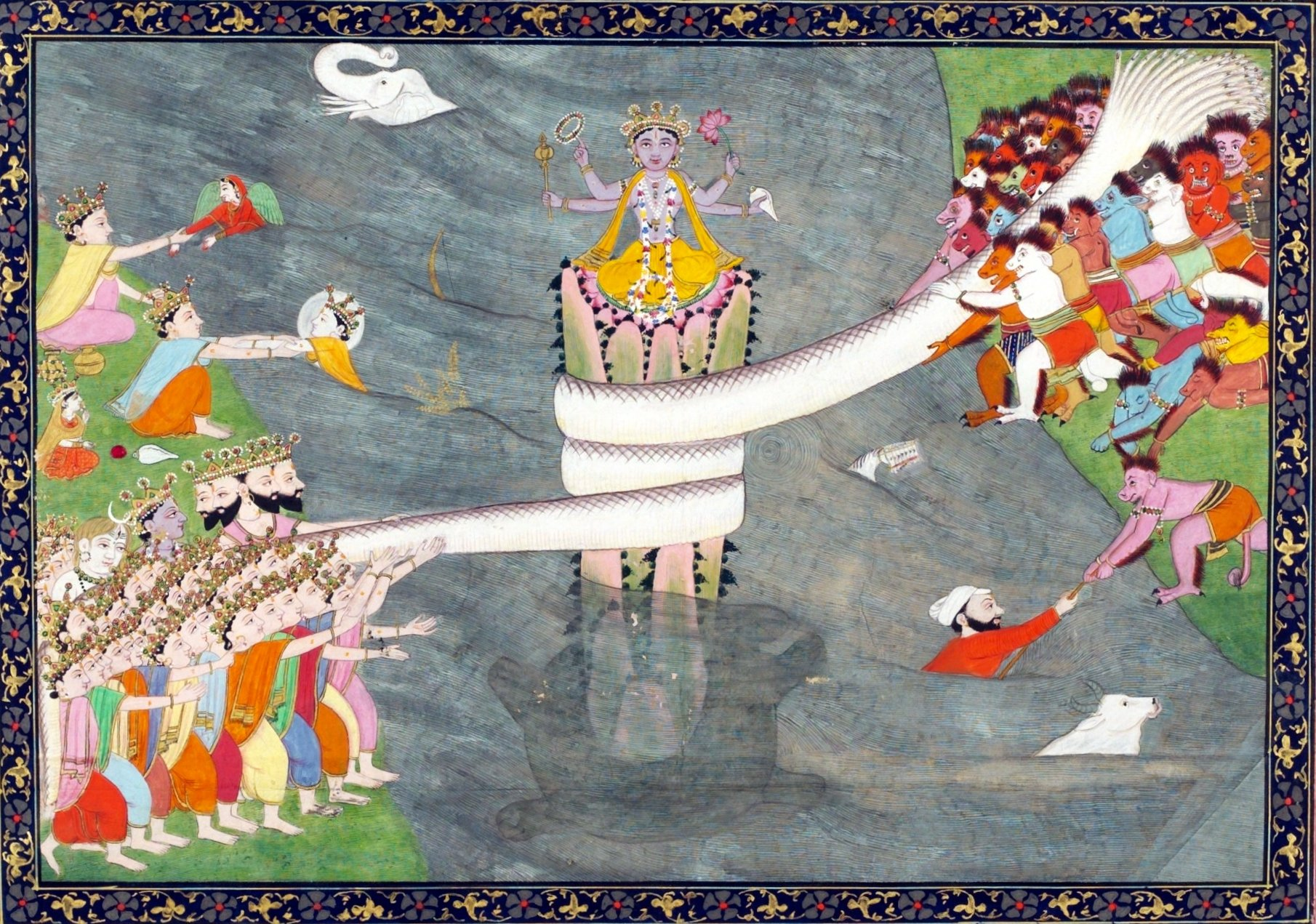
Kurma avatara of Vishnu, below Mount Mandara, with Vasuki wrapped around it, during Samudra Manthana, the churning of the Ocean of milk. ca 1870.

Mandara (Sanskrit: मन्दारः; mandārah) is the name of the mountain that appears in the Samudra Manthana episode in the Hindu Puranas, where it was used as a churning rod to churn the Ocean of Milk. Shiva's serpent, Vasuki, offered to serve as the rope pulled on one side by a team of asuras (i.e., demons), and on the other, by a team of devas (i.e., gods). It is frequently identified as a residence of the deity Shiva and Parvati, a site of intense spirituality.

== Literature ==
The primary Puranic significance of Mount Mandara is its use as a churning rod to retrieve amrita, the nectar of immortality, from the depths of the primal ocean. In the narrative, the devas (i.e., gods) and asuras (i.e., demons) were unable to uproot the mountain themselves and required the assistance of the celestial serpent Ananta to move it to the ocean.

During the churning process, the serpent Vasuki, served as the churning rope, wrapped around the mountain. The asuras held the serpent's head while the devas held its tail. To prevent the massive mountain from sinking into the ocean floor, the god Vishnu assumed his second avatar as a tortoise Kurma, to act as a pivoting base for the mountain's weight.

The churning of the ocean using Mount Mandara produced fourteen precious treasures, including the goddess Lakshmi, the celestial horse Uchchaihshravas, the white elephant Airavata, Soma (i.e., the moon), and eventually the vessel of amrita. However, the process also released the deadly Kalakuta poison, which Shiva consumed to protect the universe.

== Religious Significance ==
In Hindu cosmology, Mount Mandara is heavily associated with the god Shiva, who is said to have established a golden residence there. It is the setting for numerous divine interactions, for example, the Skandapurana recounts Shiva playfully addressing Parvati on the mountain inspiring her to perform tapas (i.e., austerities). Mandara itself is described to have practiced tapas for five thousand divine years to win Shiva's favor.The Mahabharata describes Mandara as "the best of mountains," rising eleven thousand yojanas upward and descending the same distance downward. According to the Bhagavata Purana, the mountain was used as a churning rod during the Samudra Manthana, with the god Vishnu incarnating as a tortoise to serve as a pivot for its rotation. The Narada Purana describes Mandara as a source of jewels and medicinal herbs, as well as a place of penance for sages.

== Symbolism and Interpretation ==
Philosophically, Mount Mandara is interpreted as the world axis or stambha, representing a pillar linking different planes of existence and consciousness. In Tantric and psychological interpretations, the mountain symbolizes the human spine or the physical consciousness that must be "churned" through spiritual practice to achieve the nectar of enlightenment.

Some scholars have looked at this story in different ways. Heinrich Zimmer, for instance, thought the whole churning image was really about how the universe keeps going through the same cycles creation, destruction, then creation again. The Yoga Upanishads take a different angle. They read the churning as a kind of meditation lesson. The mountain staying perfectly still in the middle of all that chaos? That's like a yogi holding a steady posture. And that nectar they're all fighting over amrita, the stuff of immortality that's the whole point of spiritual practice. You sit still, you keep churning through your own mind, and eventually you get there.

== Depictions ==
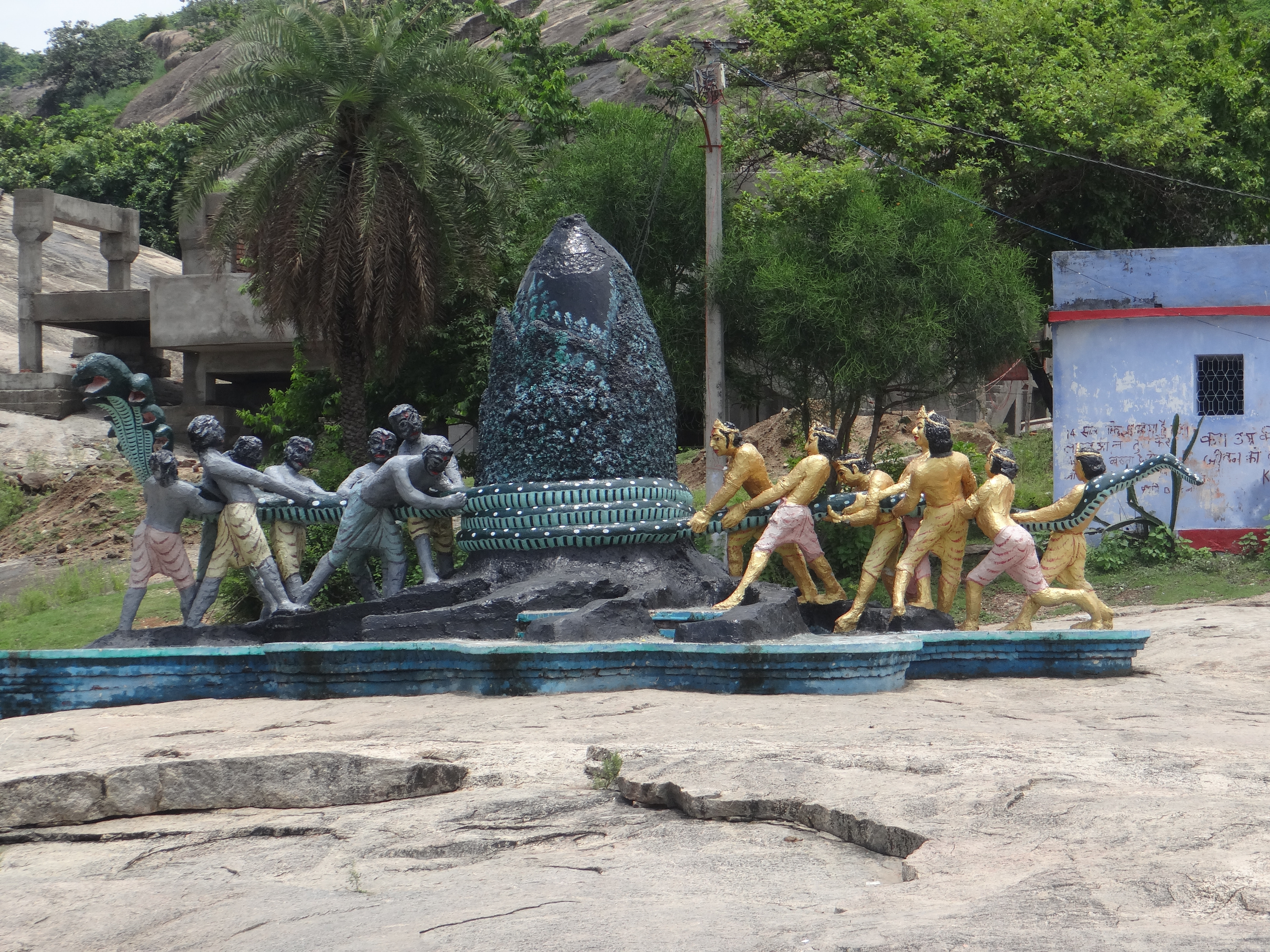
Depiction of Mandara used for the Churning of the Ocean

The imagery of Mount Mandara and the Churning of the Ocean is a common motif in Hindu and Buddhist art, seen in India and Southeast Asia:

- Angkor Wat: The most famous depiction is a massive 12th-century bas-relief in Cambodia showing hundreds of gods and demons pulling Vasuki around the mountain.
- Indonesia: Archaeological finds in East Java, such as the Sirah Kentjong spot, depict the churning process as part of hydraulic systems where water gushes from the mountain peak, symbolizing the production of auspicious water.
- Indian Temples: Narrative reliefs on the Padamata temple in Rajasthan, from the 8th century, depict myths of Parvati and the emergence of warrior goddesses associated with the mountain. In South India, tortoise-shaped bases for lamps and wedding platforms (i.e., kalyana mandapams) evoke the stability Mandara provided during the emergence of the world's treasures.

The depiction of the Churning of the Ocean of Milk became very popular in Khmer art, perhaps because their creation myth involved a Nāga ancestor.
