= Puja thali =

Prayer plates in Hinduism

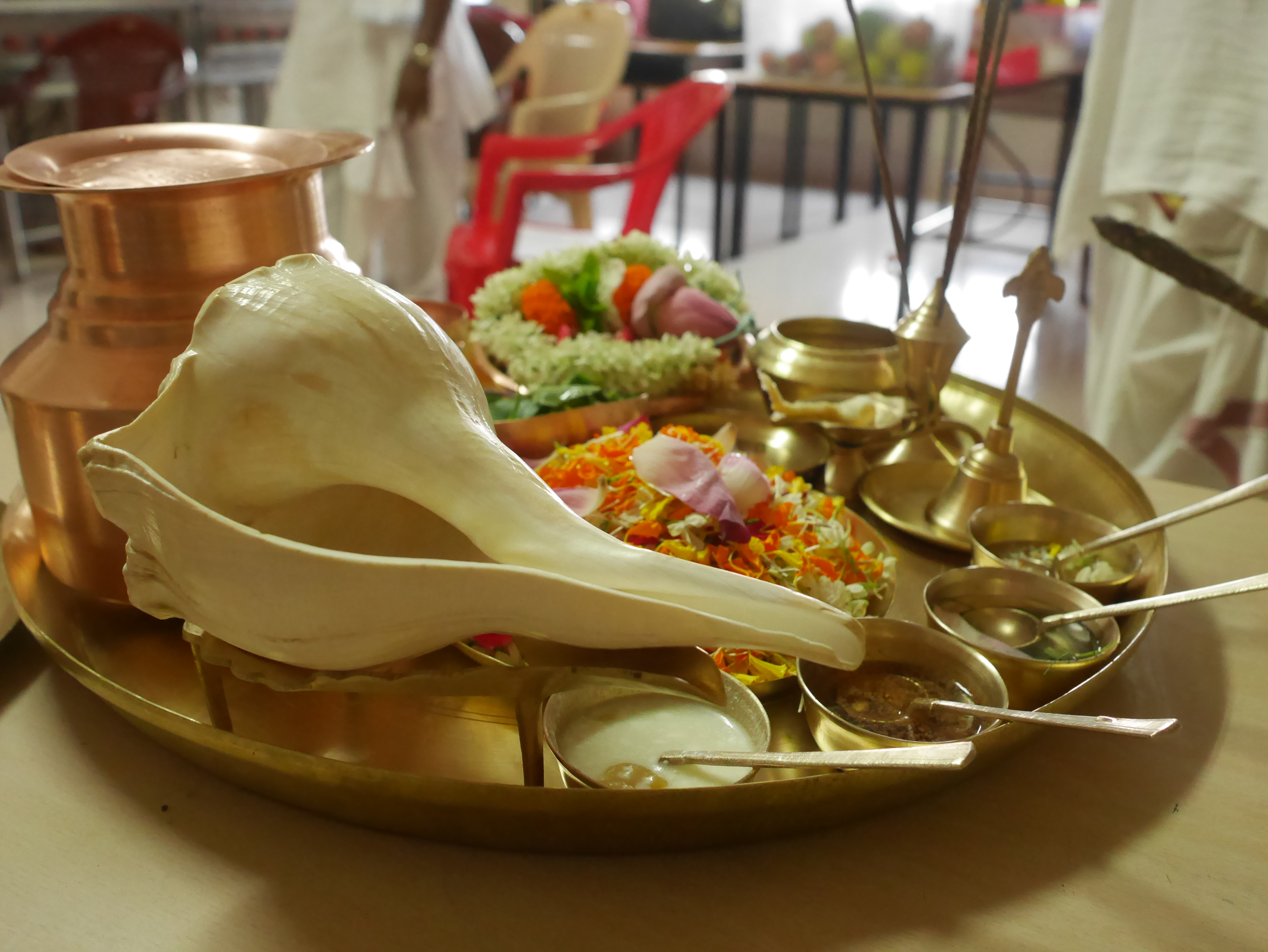
Archana plate for worship in Gaudiya Vaisnava tradition. All Puja items like pancamrta, flowers, conchshell, ringing bell etc

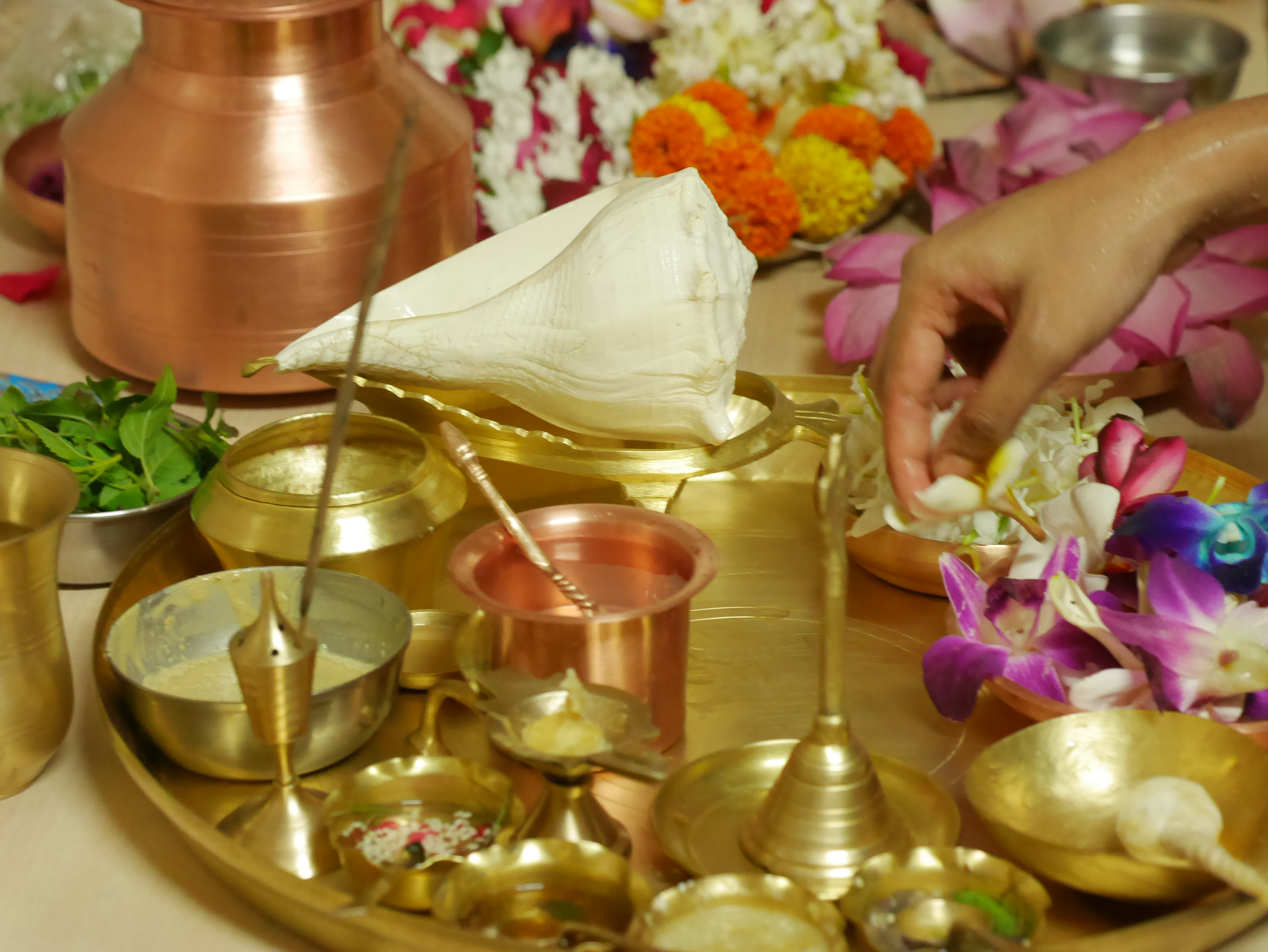
Archana plate for worship.

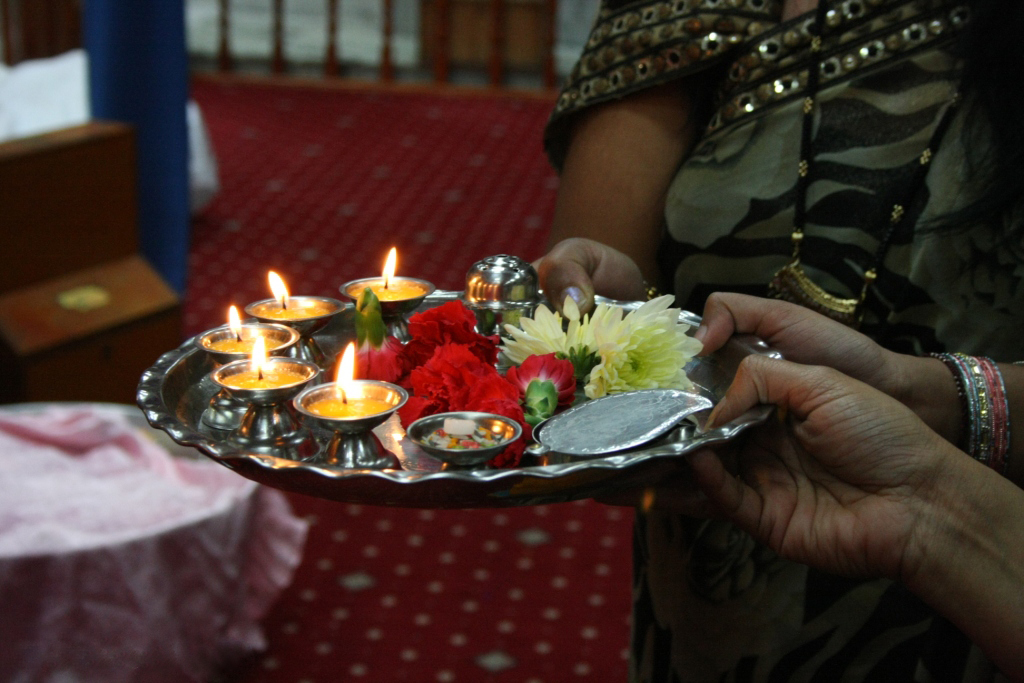
A puja thali.

A puja thali (Sanskrit: पूजा थाली, romanized: Pūjā thālī, lit. 'prayer plate') is a tray or large container on which puja materials are accumulated and decorated. On Hindu religious occasions, festivals, traditions and rituals, the puja thali maintains an auspicious role. A puja thali may be made of steel, gold, silver, brass, or any other metal; it may be rounded, oval, or any other shaped or with little engravings and other decorations.

== Materials ==
The following materials must be in a puja thali :

- Turmeric paste/sindura (Vermilion) paste/Rangoli color for holy symbols like 'Om', 'Swastika' etc.
- Akshata (unbroken rice grains).
- Diyas and incense sticks (Agarwood).
- Coconuts
- Flowers (marigolds, roses, and various designs with single color petals or a combination of different colors).
- Prasadam.
- Holy water in a container.

Along with these, a ghanta (bell), a conch (Shankha), a kalasha (holy pitcher) with holy water, ghee, camphor, betel-leaves, tulasi, milk, fresh fruits, sandalwood-paste, kumkuma, murti (earthen images) of deities and gold or silver coins may be include as needed.

=== Variations ===
On the occasion of Deepavali, more than one diya might be arranged on thali; on Raksha Bandhan, a rakhi may be added. Bael-leaves and datura flowers are included in the thali for the Mahashivaratri festival.

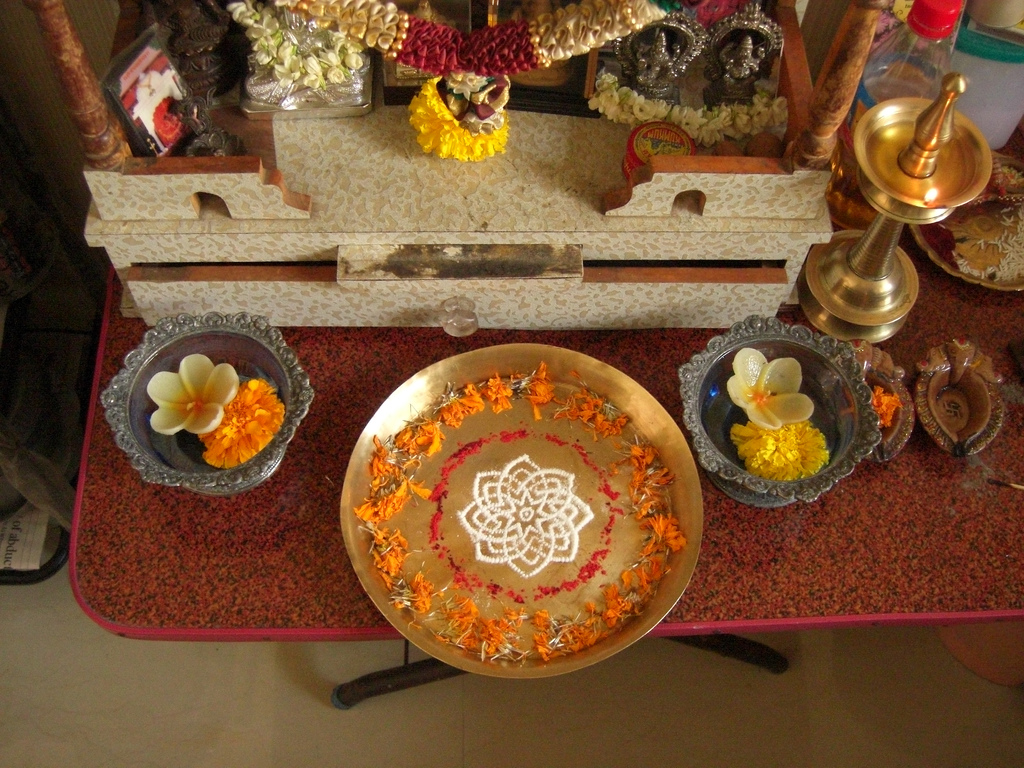
A decorated puja thali in the puja place.
