= Sivalaya Ottam =

Ritual marathon in Kanyakumari, India

Sivalaya Ottam - Route map and Distance chart

Sivalaya Ottam (Tamil: சிவாலய ஓட்டம், Malayalam: ശിവാലയ ഓട്ടം) is a ritual marathon undertaken by the devotees to the 12 Siva shrines in the district of Kanyakumari on the day of Sivarathri.

From 2014 onwards the day was announced as a local holiday for the district.

== Ottam route ==
The Ottam begins at Thirumalai, the first Sivalayam and goes all through the next 10 temples before ending at Thirunattalam.

Sivalaya Ottam - Route Table
Sl.No	From	Via	To	km
1.	Thirumalai	Kunnathoor, Kappucaud, Vettuvanni, Marthandam, Gnaramvilai	Thikkurichi	11.80
2.	Thikkurichi	Chitharal, Ambalakkadai, Arumanai, Kaliyal	Thirpparappu	12.40
3.	Thirpparappu	Kulasekaram	Thirunandhikkarai	8.14
4.	Thirunandhikkarai	Kulasekaram	Ponmanai	7.74
5.	Ponmanai	Chithirancode, Kumarapuram, Muttacaud	Pannippagam	10.40
6.	Pannippagam	Saral vilai, Marunthukkottai, Padmanabhapuram	Kalkulam	5.73
7.	Kalkulam	Padmanabhapuram	Melancode	3.37
8.	Melancode	Kumaracoil Bus stop, Villukuri	Thiruvidaicode	4.66
9.	Thiruvidaicode	Villukuri, Thuckalay, Keralapuram	Thiruvithancode	8.60
10.	Thiruvithancode	Nadukkadai, Kodiyoor, Perambi, Palliyadi	Thirupanthicode	9.21
11.	Thirupanthicode	-	Thirunattalam	4.08

== Rituals ==
Special pujas will be conducted at temple at Thirumalai. The ritual begin after the devotees taking a holy-dip in the Thamirabharani river at Munchirai, the first Sivalayam. The participants wear saffron robes, hold a palm-leaf fan on their hand and chant the mantra "Govinda... Gopaala..." all through the whole day of running. The pilgrims receive the holy ashes, "Thiruneer" from all the eleven temples. The purpose for the pilgrimage is believed to be fulfilled only by receiving the Sandal-paste from the final Sankaranarayanar Temple at Thirunattalam. After this, it is also told that a worship at Adi Kesava Temple at Thiruvattar nearby is also very useful after this ceremony. The objective of the pilgrimage is to uphold that Siva and Vishnu are both the manifestations of one supreme being.

Before, the devotees observes a one-week fast. tender coconut and tender palmyra in the day time and tulsi-water at night are the only food items taken by the devotees during the fasting days.

== Location Address of Shivalaya Ottam ==
Shivalayam 01 - Thirumalai Mahadevan Temple, 75PF+CV5, Thirumala Temple Rd, Angavilai, Munchirai, Tamil Nadu 629171
Shivalayam 02 - Thickurichy Sri Mahadever Temple, Thickurichy, Tamil Nadu 629168
Shivalayam 03 - Thriparappu Mahadevar Temple (Sri Jadadharan) திற்பரப்பு மகாதேவர் கோவில் തൃപ്പരപ്പ് ശ്രീ മഹാദേവ ക്ഷേത്രം, 97R5+RW7, Tiruparapu, Tamil Nadu 629151
Shivalayam 04 - Thirunanthikarai Sree Nandheeswarar Temple, Nandheeswara, Thirunanthikarai, Tamil Nadu 629161
Shivalayam 05 - Ponmanai Sree Thimbileshwarar Mahadevar Temple, 983J+QJ8, Ponmanai, Tamil Nadu 629161
Shivalayam 06, Sri Pannipaham Sivan Temple(Sri Kirathamurthi), 78MG+MMX, Kothinallur, Tamil Nadu 629166
Shivalayam 07 - Kalkulam Sri Neelakandeswarar Temple, 68XH+RQC, Chakala, Thuckalay, Tamil Nadu 629175
Shivalayam 08 - Melancode Sri Mahadevar Temple (Sri Kala Kalar), 68WV+73H, Thuckalay, Kumaracoil, Tamil Nadu 629175
Shivalayam 09 - Thiruvidaikodu Sri Mahadeva Temple (Sri Sadayappar), 69C6+FHP, NH 47, Villukuri, Tamil Nadu 629801
Shivalayam 10, Thiruvithamcode Sree Mahadevar Temple, 67QX+G5Q, 10th Sivalayam, Thiruvithankodu, Thiruvithamcode, Tamil Nadu 629174
Shivalayam 11 - Thripannicode Sri Bhaktavatsalaeeswarevar Temple, 7793+GJ2, Valvaithankoshtam, Tamil Nadu 629169
Shivalayam 12 - Thirunattalam Sri Sankaranarayanan Temple, 76FM+QC6, Nattalam, Tamil Nadu 629162

== See also ==
- Google Earth Project - Sivalaya Ottam
- Shivarathri App
