= Choozhal =

Village in Tamil Nadu, India

- village
- Location within Tamil Nadu Location within Kerala Location within India
- Coordinates: 8.32°N 77.13°E
- Country: India
- State: Tamil Nadu
- District: Kanyakumari

Government
  - Type: Gram Panchayat

Population (2011)
  - Total: 6,158

Languages
  - Official: Tamil
- Time zone: UTC+5:30 (IST)

Choozhal is a village in Tamil Nadu located nearly 60 kilometres (37 mi) from Kanyakumari and 40 kilometres (25 mi) from Thiruvananthapuram, Kerala. It is on the border between Tamil Nadu and Kerala, India.

Choozhal is within the Munchirai municipality. It contains a lot of churches and temples; among them are Choozhal-Piracode Sree Krishna Swamy Temple, Pammakkulangara Sree Bhadrakali Temple (famous for Iratta Ponkala), Madathu Nada Sree Dharma Shastha Temple, St Little Flower MSC Church, St Joseph MSC Church, St Thomas MSC Church Ambilikonam, St Michael's Church Choozhal, and Kingdom Hall of Jehovah's Witnesses at Choozhal Junction.

Residents of Choozhal are mainly farmers or government employees.

== Geography ==
Choozhal is situated 4 km from Parassala, Kerala and 6 km from Kaliyakkavilai, Tamil Nadu. It is fairly well-connected by bus, rail, and air; the nearest railway station, Parassala, is situated approximately 4 km from Choozhal.

== Demographics ==
As of the 2011 India census, the village had a population of 6,158. There were 3,094 females and 3,064 males with a sex-ratio of 1,009 females for every 1,000 males, well above the national average of 929. A total of 627 were children below the age of six.

== Attractions ==
The main attraction of Choozhal is the Choozhal-Piracode Sree Krishna Swamy Temple. The temple celebrates its annual festival, known as Kumbha Rohini Mahotsavam, during the months of February to March. In the early days, the village is known as Shankurutty. After a period of time, the village was named Krishnapuram which originated from the name of the Lord Sree Krishna. Once upon a time, this temple was a bhajan mandir and Uriyadi with Bhajana Pattabhishekeam (annual festival) was conducted regularly. Sivasankara Panicker presided over the temple committee for a long period. In 1973, the original structure was demolished, making way for the construction of a new temple. Thanks to the active participation of the community, the present Sree Krishna Swamy Temple was inaugurated on April 17, 1979. Later, on February 18, 2008, the temple was reconstructed again with the generous support of the local community. There is also a Bhadrakali Temple situated in Piracode, opposite to Krishanpuram famous for iratta ponkala.

A Youth Social Services (YSS) society located at Krishnapuram performs social services in the area. The facilities include a library with a huge collection of books, information room, and a public television room. The club celebrates its annual function during the month of August to September in connection with the Onam festival, by conducting various programmes which include various sports, arts, quizzes, etc. The club also promotes students of class 10th and 12th by awarding students who topped with marks.
