= Neelkanth (film) =

- Directed by: Hitesh Raval, Mahendra Varsani
- Screenplay by: Mahendra Varsani
- Story by: Mahendra Varsani; Bhuj Mandir
- Produced by: Kanji Varsani, Mahendra Samatrai
- Starring: Purva Joshi; Hitesh Raval; Atul Patel; Happy Bhavsar; Bhargav Joshi
- Narrated by: Ashish Kakkad
- Cinematography: Haresh P. Shah
- Edited by: Sunil Vaghela
- Music by: Ranjit
- Production company: Mahendra Varsani Creation Co.
- Distributed by: Mahendra Varsani Creation Co.
- Release date: 13 July 2012
- Running time: 127 minute
- Country: India
- Language: Gujarati

Neelkanth (Gujarati: નીલકંઠ Hindi: नीलकंठ) is a 2012 Gujarati film based on childhood story of Swaminarayan. The film has true inspiring story of 11 years old teenage yogi, Neelkanth, who renounced his home and took an extraordinary spiritual - incredible pilgrimage on the foot across the length and breadth of India. This is story of struggle, determination, kindness, courage, compassion, austerity, adventure, faith, fearlessness and survival of child.

== Plot ==
The movie begins with the heart touching montage "India, the country rich with the most ancient culture in the world. ShriRam, the Maryada Purushottam (The supreme human being with regard to observing the restrictions laid down by the society), and Yogeshwar (The God of Yoga) Shri Krishna took incarnation. The period from 1707 to 1858 was particularly difficult. Anarchy prevailed everywhere. Intrigued by the British policy to divide and rule the states are fighting with one another. Holy men have become pompous and hypocrite to serve their own ends. Unscrupulous people in the disguise of holy men roam everywhere to cheat and loot the people. It is the same land where women were elevated to the status of goddess but now they are subjected to heinous cruelty. In the blind desire to have a son, they drown the girl child in milk immediately after her birth. The evil practice of 'Sati' - a widowed woman immolating herself on the pyre of her deceased husband - has become deep rooted. Chaos and anarchy are all-pervading because of ignorance and lack of spiritual understanding. India awaits a reformer."

The film shows true life story of Swaminarayan from his birth, Ghanashyama's gracious-amiable Leela. After death of his parents, on 29 June 1792, Neelkanth begins his journey of awakening. Having resolved to embrace the challenges of nature, he leaves his home in the city of Ayodhya at the age of 11. Neelkanth walks alone into the cold stormy night, wearing nothing over his shoulders or under his feet. Neelkanth took very few possessions with him on his journey. Known articles include a loin cloth, "a rosary, a kerchief, a piece of cloth for filtering water, a small manuscript and inner courage, confidence and a silent spiritual strength." At the Saryu River, Kaliddatt's fellows Kaushikdatt and other devils throw him in river. Neelkanth is swept away, leaving behind all that was familiar. He took an extraordinary spiritual - incredible journey across the India. He walked alone, barefoot and bare body continuously. This is story of struggle, determination, kindness, courage, compassion, austerity, adventure, faith, fearlessness and survival of child. Neelkanth walked 12,000 kilometers around the Indian subcontinent over a span of 7 years. The Film is ended with continuous journey of the child and to be continued for Part 2.

== Cast ==
- Purva Joshi as Neelkanth, Ghanshyam
- Hitesh Raval as Kalidatt
- Atul Patel as Pibek
- Happy Bhavsar as Bhaktidevi
- Bhargav Joshi as Dharmadev
- Sachin Brahmbhatt as Rampratap
- Priyanka Bhavanandi as Suvasini
- Nilu Pathak as Brahman Stri
- Anirudhdhsinh Gohil as Manaskhau Rakshak
- Haresh Dagiya as Sweet Vendor
- Kaushika Goswami as Maya Rani
- Prabhakar Shukla as Muni

== Production ==
=== Development ===
The film was made with sole aim to spread knowledge, spirituality and inspire people by childhood charitra of Swamianrayan. The film's story adopted from holy books of Swaminarayan sect. (Shree Hari Charitramrut, Shree Hari Van Vicharan, Shrimad Satsangee Jeevan). The film's pre production was started in October 2010. The Script was made under kind guidance of Shree Swaminarayan Temple - Bhuj (Kutch).

=== Filming ===
The film shot in Kutch, Gandhinagar and Baroda. The film was shot at 30 different locations in 42 days. The unit has done Muhurt shot in Shree Nar Narayandev Temple - Bhuj Kutch in January 2011. The film was shot in real location of Kutch - Gujarat and on set made by unit in Baroda. The whole film shoot was completed in end of May 2011.

== Soundtrack ==
Neelkanth

Soundtrack album by Mahendra Samatrai Creation Co.
- Released: 26 September 2011
- Genre: Feature film soundtrack
- Length: 27:36
- Label: Mahendra Varsani Creation Co.
- Producer: Kanji Varsani

Track list
No.	Title	Lyrics	Artist(s)	Length
1.	"He Brahmnayak Dev Morari"	Gordhan Veghad	Arun Rajyaguru, Kritika Jani	4:58
2.	"O Ghanashyam"	Gordhan Veghad	Kritika Jani	5:20
3.	"Varni Karie Vandan"	Gordhan Veghad	Praful Dave	5:36
4.	"O Natvar Nana"	Gordhan Veghad	Praful Dave, Kritika Jani	4:22
5.	"Bhakti Amari"	Gordhan Veghad	Child Chorus	4:08
Total length:				23:44

== Release ==
The premier celebration was held for Saints at mini theater of Shree Nar Narayandev Temple - Bhuj and cinema premier on 13 July 2012 with the presence of Saints, Local Politicians, Actors and other honorable people.

The movie was initially released at Bhuj. After great response in the first week, The movie was released in Gujarat, India. The film was also screened in Australia.

== Awards and nominations ==
Neelkanth received 6 awards and 14 nominations in categories ranging from the film itself to its direction, cinematography, screenplay, music and acting.
