= Halahala =

Hindu mythological poison

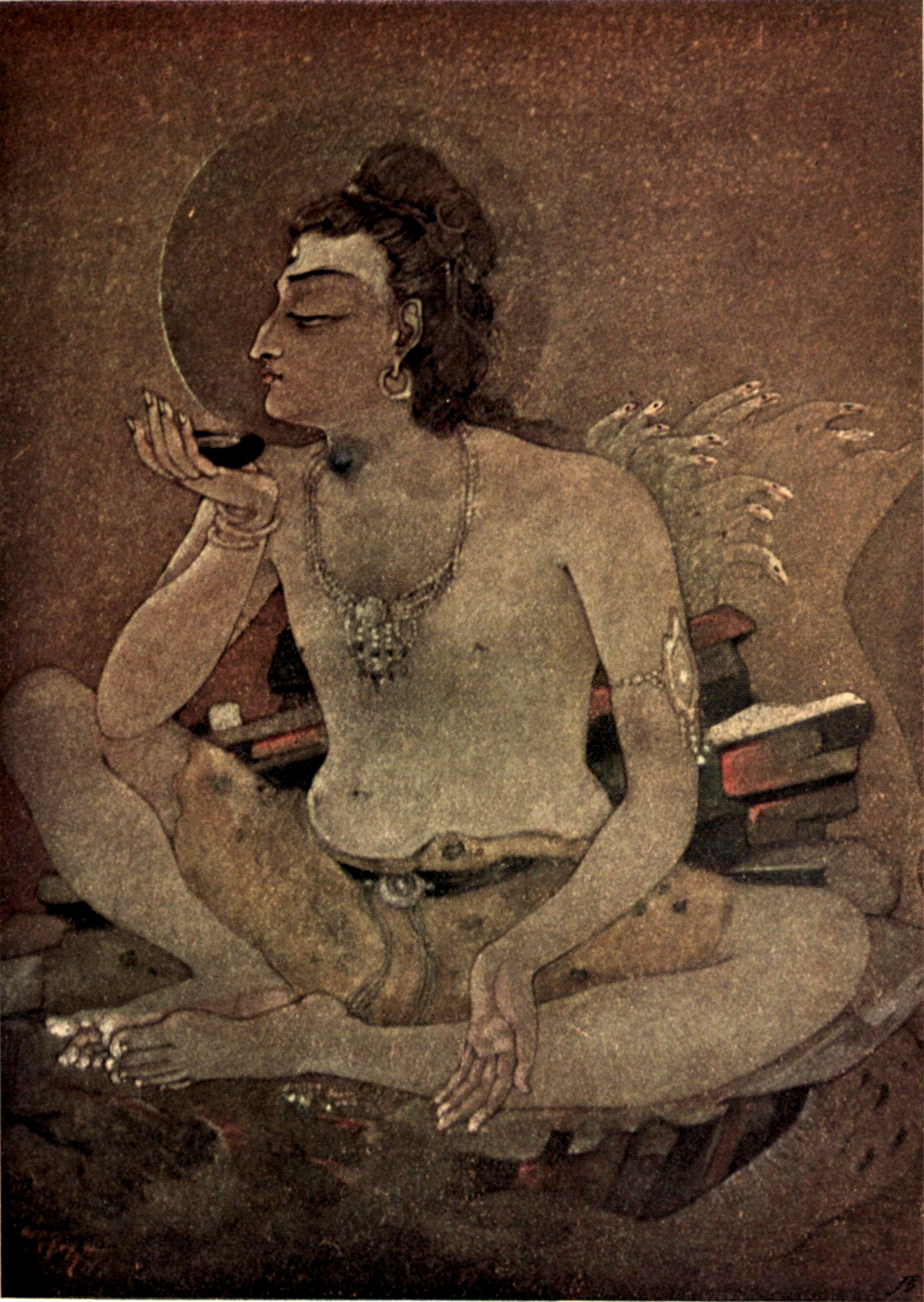
Shiva drinks the kalakuta poison

Halāhala (Sanskrit हलाहल) or Kālakūṭa (Sanskrit कालकूट, lit. 'poison of death') is the name of a poison in Hindu mythology. It was created from the Ocean of Milk when the devas and the asuras churned it (see Samudra Manthana) in order to obtain amrita, the nectar of immortality.

Fourteen different ratnas (treasures) were recovered from this episode, which were distributed between the two clans. But before the amrita could be formed, Halāhala was produced, which started injuring both sides. As no one could bear the lethal fumes emitted by the poison, both the devas and the asuras began to collapse due to asphyxiation. They ran for help to Brahma who advised them to seek assistance from Shiva. Both parties went to Mount Kailash, and prayed to Shiva for help.

Shiva chose to consume the entire poison and thus drank it. His wife, the goddess Sati, was alarmed, as she gripped her husband's neck with both hands in order to stop the poison from reaching his stomach, thus earning him the epithet Viṣakaṇṭha (the one who held poison in his neck). The poison turned his throat blue. Hence, he is also known as Nīlakaṇṭha (the one with a blue throat).

However, according to rigveda (10.136.7) and Mahabharata Kumbakonam edition version of the legend, when halāhala was produced, Vayu, the god of wind, rubbed it in his hands to reduce its potency. Then a small portion was given to Shiva, turning his throat blue. The rest was collected in a golden vessel and digested by Vayu. In another version, Vayu drank first and Shiva last. In yet another version, Shiva drank the kālakūṭa poison of the snake Vasuki, second king of the nāgas, a familiar of Shiva whom Shiva blessed and often draped around his own neck as they spent time together, for it was Vasuki, stretched out stiffly, whom the gods used as the tool to turn the mountain for the churning of the Ocean of Milk.

== In Persian ==
Halāhil (Persian: هلاهل) is a term used in classical Persian literature and lexicography for an exceptionally powerful and lethal poison. In Persian usage, the word also came to be employed more generally for deadly or highly potent poisons.

According to the Persian Dehkhoda Dictionary, citing the Burhān-e Qāṭeʿ, halāhil was described as a poison so deadly that no antidote could cure it and that it could kill within a short time. Another source quoted by Dehkhoda, Baḥr al-Jawāhir, identifies it as a kind of aconite (Persian: bīš) said to be so poisonous that even its vapour or scent could be fatal.

Some traditional lexicographical sources associate the name with a geographical locality. The Anjoman-ārā describes Halāhil as the name of a place in Sindh, where an especially potent and deadly variety of aconite was said to grow, hence the expression “poison of Halāhil”. Dehkhoda also reports, on the authority of Ibn al-Baytar, that Halāhil was the name of a region in China, near the frontier between China and India, where this poisonous plant was believed to grow.

In Persian literary usage, halāhil became a conventional expression for an extremely deadly poison. It occurs in the works of poets including Abu Shakur Balkhi, Ferdowsi, Farrukhi Sistani, Nizami Ganjavi, Rumi, and Hafez.

Ferdowsi, for example, uses the expression zahr-e halāhil (“halāhil poison”) in the Shahnameh, while Hafez likewise employs zahr-e halāhil figuratively for a deadly poison.

== In popular culture ==
The second episode of the Hindi television show Sacred Games was named Halahala based on the poison.

== See also ==
- Samudra Manthana
- Kshira Sagara
- Vasuki
- Kali (asura)
- Nilkanth Mahadev
