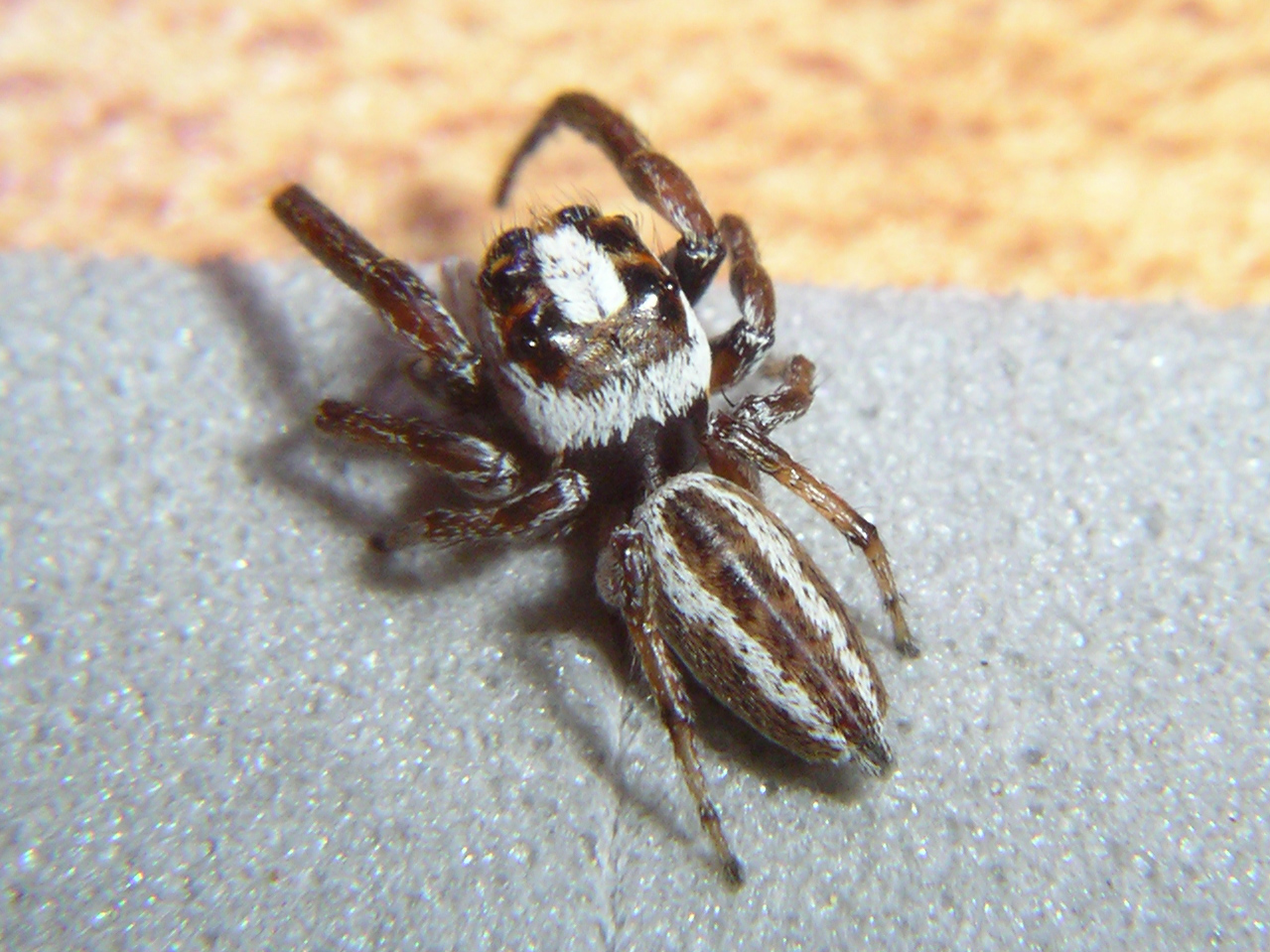
- Male Nilakantha sp.

Scientific classification
- Kingdom: Animalia
- Phylum: Arthropoda
- Subphylum: Chelicerata
- Class: Arachnida
- Order: Araneae
- Infraorder: Araneomorphae
- Family: Salticidae
- Subfamily: Salticinae
- Genus: Nilakantha; Peckham & Peckham, 1901

Type species
- Nilakantha cockerelli Peckham & Peckham, 1901

Species
- See text.

Diversity
- 4 species

= Nilakantha (spider) =

Nilakantha Temporal range: Neogene–present

Genus of spiders

Nilakantha is a spider genus of the jumping spider family, Salticidae.

== Species ==
As of November 2015, the World Spider Catalog accepted 4 species of Nilakantha:

- Nilakantha cockerelli Peckham & Peckham, 1901 – Hispaniola, Jamaica
- Nilakantha crucifera (F. O. Pickard-Cambridge, 1901) – Panama
- Nilakantha inerma (Bryant, 1940) – Cuba
- Nilakantha peckhami Bryant, 1940 – Cuba
