= Mahendra Varsani =

Indian screenwriter

- Born: 21 February 1989 (age 37); Bhuj, Gujarat, India
- Other name: Mahendra Samatrai
- Education: Master In Business Administration
- Occupations: Director, Producer, Screenwriter
- Years active: 2010–present
- Organization: Mahendra Varsani Creation Co.
- Notable work: Neelkanth - A Film, SangharshGaatha - A Documentary
- Spouse: Vanita Samatrai
- Awards: Dance, Screenplay, Movie, Story

Mahendra Varsani (born 21 February 1989) is an Indian producer, director and screenwriter of Gujarati-Hindi films, best known for the film Neelkanth (2012).

== Early life and education ==
Mahendra Varsani also known as Mahendra Samatrai was born on 21 February 1989 in Bhuj to a Kutchi Leva Patel family. Mahendra did his graduation in business management at N. R. Institute of Business Management - Ahmedabad. He was very studious in his education life and received honors with various awards in his school & college life. In school & college days he was involved with various cultural activities including play and dancing. After completed graduation, he went London - UK for study of master in business management. After completed post graduation study in London, he switch his interest from business management to media works.

== Career ==
Mahendra Varsani's first Screenwriter and directorial venture was Neelkanth (film) (2012) which is considered a cult classic. Neelkanth (Gujarati: નીલકંઠ Hindi: नीलकंठ) is a feature film based on childhood story of Swaminarayan. The film has true inspiring story of 11 years old teenage yogi, "Neelkanth", who renounced his home and took an extraordinary spiritual - incredible pilgrimage on the foot across the length and breath of India. This is story of struggle, determination, kindness, courage, compassion, austerity, adventure, faith, fearlessness and survival of child. Neelkanth received 8 awards and 14 nominations in categories ranging from the film itself to its direction, cinematography, screenplay, music and acting. The film was released in India and overseas. The film was generally well received by both critics and the mass audience and was a box office success.

After the huge success of Neelkanth, he has done many commercial and non-commercial advertisement, live performances, etc.

== Filmography ==
| Work | Contribution |
|---|---|
| Neelkanth (film) | Film, Writer-Director |
| Raja ni Nagaryatra | Live Performance, Director |
| Bettle of Zara | Live Performance, Director |
| Park View | Corporate Film, Director - writer |
| To few names above | List of many more |

== Awards ==
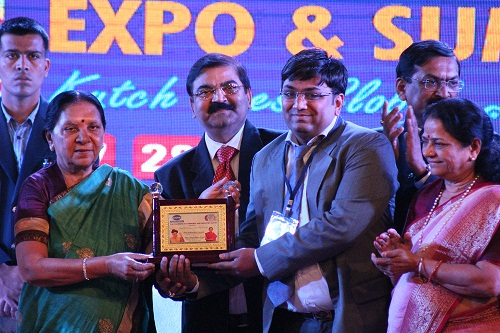
Award for Best Film Production

For Neelkanth (film)

Neelkanth received 6 awards and 14 nominations in categories ranging from the film itself to its direction, cinematography, screenplay, music and acting.

Honor and award received from Mrs. Anandiben Patel, Hon'ble Chief Minister of Gujarat He has received honor and award from Mrs. Anandiben Patel, Hon'ble Chief Minister of Gujarat at Kutch Carnival, Bhuj - Gujarat on date 28 February 2015.
