= Nilakanta (Hinduism) =

Epithet of Shiva

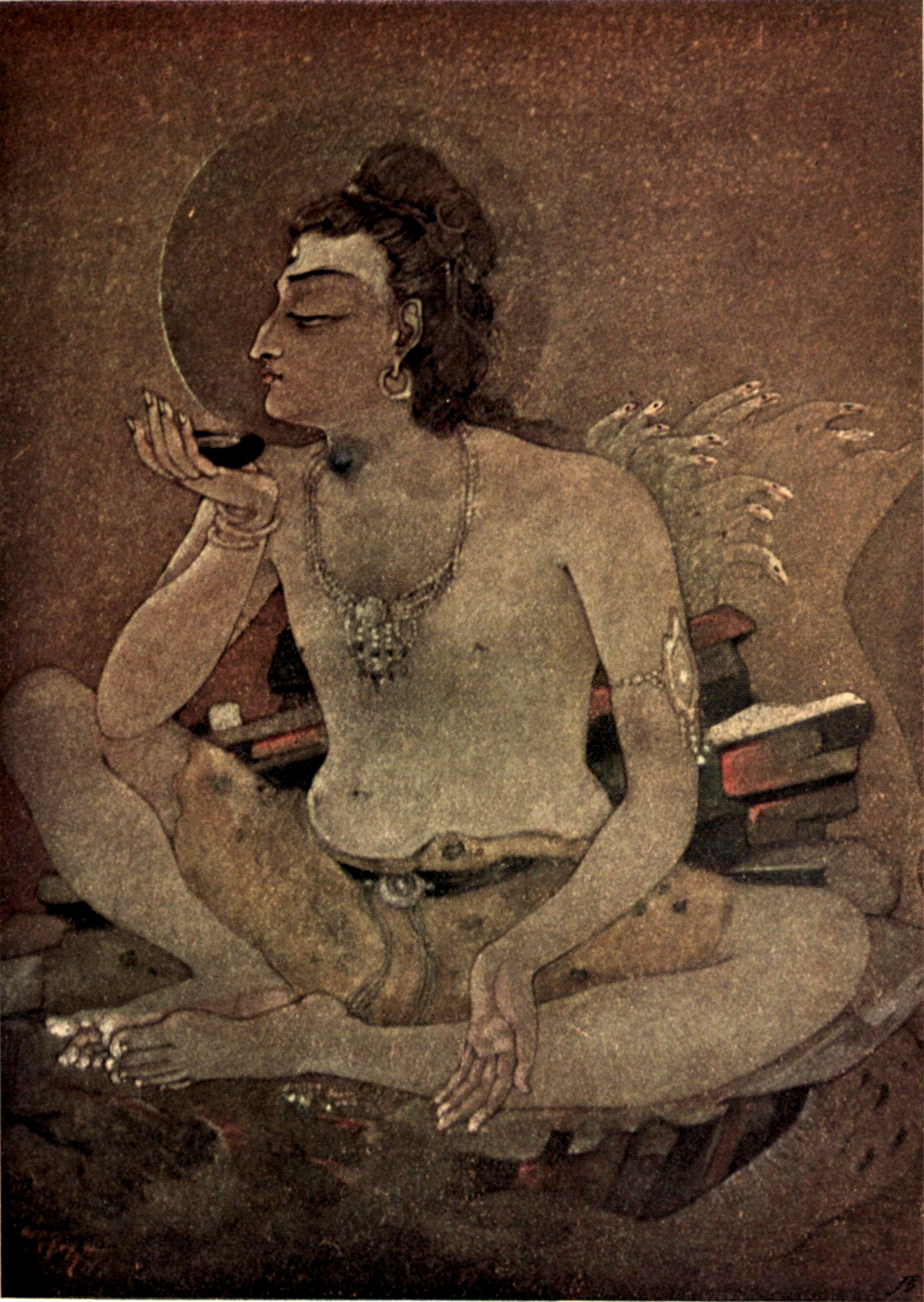
Shiva drinks the kalakuta, rendering his throat blue.

Nilakanta (Sanskrit: नीलकण्ठ, romanized: Nīlakaṇṭha, lit. 'blue throat') is one of the epithets of the Hindu deity Shiva.

== Legend ==
According to Hindu mythology, Shiva gained this epithet when he consumed the kalakuta (poison) that emerged from Samudra Manthana, which rendered his throat blue.

== See also ==
- Rudra
- Ishvara
- Maheshvara
