= Rāhukāla =

Inauspicious time period in Hindu astrology

In Hindu astrology, rāhukāla (Sanskrit: राहुकाल, lit. 'period of Rahu') or rāhukālam (Sanskrit: राहुकालम्, romanized: Rāhukālaṃ) is an inauspicious period of the day, not considered favourable to start any good deed. The rāhukāla spans for approximately 90 minutes every day between sunrise and sunset.

This inauspicious period is strictly avoided while calculating muhurtas. However, routine tasks that have already been started are regarded to be permissible to continue as usual during this period.

== Astrology ==
=== Mythology ===
Rahu is a shadow planet and king of meteors among the Navagrahas (nine planets) mentioned in Hindu texts. During the legend known as the Samudra Manthana, an asura named Svarbhanu, disguised as a deva, appears and drinks the nectar of immortality, amrita. Svarbhanu later gets caught and is cut into two pieces by Vishnu's discus, the Sudarshana Chakra. These two pieces became Rahu and Ketu.

Rahu is considered a malefic planet that tries to eclipse the Sun, and the time it is believed to influence is considered inauspicious.

=== Calculation ===
The rāhukāla is considered in a predefined manner during set times on the different days of the week, but can vary as per the time of sunrise as well. Its instances vary from place to place. The timing of sunrise is marked in the panchangam (almanac) and 12 hours of the day is divided into eight equal parts (say 06:00 a.m. IST to 6:00 p.m. IST). The period of rāhukāla does not occur in the first part of the day and the rest of the seven parts are attributed to other different parts of the day. Contemporarily:

- Monday: 7:30 a.m.–9:00 a.m. (2nd part)
- Tuesday: 3:00 p.m.–4:30 p.m. (7th part)
- Wednesday: 12:00 p.m.–1:30 p.m. (5th part)
- Thursday: 1:30 p.m.–3:00 p.m. (6th part)
- Friday: 10:30 a.m.–12:00 p.m. (4th part)
- Saturday: 9:00 a.m.–10:30 a.m. (3rd part)
- Sunday: 4:30 p.m.–6:00 p.m. (8th part)

== See also ==
- Grahana
- Svarbhanu
- Rahu
- Ketu (mythology)
- Jyotiṣa
- Navagraha
