= Kob Kin Duean =

Kob Kin duean (Thai: กบกินเดือน) is a traditional Thai and Tai folklore that explains the natural events such as lunar eclipses. The legend reflects ancient beliefs that these phenomena were caused by supernatural forces rather than by science. In many Tai communities across Thailand, Laos, and Vietnam, eclipses are described as the moment when a frog or toad attempts to swallow the sun or moon, symbolizing the struggle between natural and spiritual powers.

Regional variations of the folklore exist under different names, such as Rahu. Among the Tai, Lanna, and Lao groups, the frog is viewed as a sacred creature linked with fertility, rain, and cosmic balance between heaven and earth. The story is closely connected with traditional rituals such as drumming, shouting, or lighting firecrackers to frighten the frog and save the moon during the eclipse. Over time, the legend has intertwined with Buddhist and Hindu influences, reflecting a blend of indigenous animism and later religious beliefs across Tai cultures.

== Legends ==
This legend of Kob Kin Duean is significant in the cosmology of various Tai peoples, including the Thai (particularly Lanna) and Lao. It often exists alongside or integrated with the Hindu myth of Rahu and Ketu.

The myth generally centers on a celestial figure, which in some traditions is explicitly a giant frog (Kob), or in others is the asura Rahu who is symbolically represented or conflated with the frog. The theme describes a monstrous being attempting to swallow a celestial body, plunging the world into temporary darkness.

The belief in Kob Kin Duean explains eclipses as a result of struggle between the Sun, the Moon, and the Frog, interpreted through two main frameworks in Thai folklore.

=== The Frog as Protagonist (Local Tai Belief) ===
In the original indigenous belief of the Tai peoples, the Frog was viewed as a benevolent deity (เทพฝ่ายธรรม) or hero. The Moon was considered the antagonist or thief (ผู้ลักขโมย).

One variant recounts where a Frog, brought back to life by magic herbs, volunteers to retrieve the life-giving elixir after the Moon steals it from the Frog's human benefactors. When the Frog attempts to get close to the Moon, villagers mistaking the Frog's attempt to retrieve the medicine for an act of consumption start beating drums and gongs to drive it away, preventing the Frog from successfully completing its mission. The Frog continues its struggle against the Moon eternally, which is the eclipse.

The original belief in the Frog also carried connotations of abundance and fertility.

=== The Frog as Antagonist (Hindu/Buddhist Integration) ===
With the absorption of Hindu cosmology—specifically the myth of Rahu—the narrative shifted. The Frog (Kob) became the villain or demonic force swallowing celestial bodies. The Frog was conflated with Rahu, the disembodied asura seeking revenge. The Sun and Moon became deities of righteousness (เทพฝ่ายธรรม), while the Frog represented chaos and ignorance.

=== Alternative Legend: The Lost Magic Elixir ===
Another version explains the Frog’s motive as a fight to retrieve stolen magical herbs. The story begins with two brothers, Suriyakhrat (Solar Eclipse) and Chanthrakhrat (Lunar Eclipse), who discover a life-giving elixir used by the Sun and Moon gods to revive each other. They collect the elixir and revive several dead animals—including a frog—that become their followers. When the gods reclaim the elixir, the brothers and their animal followers battle the Sun and Moon to retrieve it. The Frog, having failed to recover the medicine, continues its eternal pursuit—causing eclipses.

=== Central and Northeastern Thai Belief ===
Another prominent Thai interpretation, known as “กบกินเดือนกินตะวัน” ("The Frog Eats the Moon and the Sun"), was inscribed on Thailand’s National Intangible Cultural Heritage list in 2013 under “Folk Literature and Language.” In this cosmology, eclipses occur when a sacred frog swallows the Sun or Moon, darkening the sky. When released, light returns—symbolizing the cycle of day and night.

Scholar Supat Charoensappuech (2019) links the myth to the Thai words “คืน” (night/return) and “กลืน” (to swallow), suggesting that “night” represents the temporary swallowing of daylight by the cosmic frog.

== Astrology ==
In Thai cosmology, Kob Kin Duean reflects an indigenous explanation of eclipses: a frog swallowing the Moon, symbolizing temporary disruption of cosmic balance. Eclipses were regarded as inauspicious, associated with loss of celestial vitality. Rituals such as drum-beating and metal clanging were performed to drive away the frog and restore balance. The frog, a fertility and rain symbol, represents both creation and chaos within Tai belief systems.

The myth parallels other regional eclipse legends, such as the Hindu Rahu and the Chinese myth of a celestial dragon consuming the Moon. These similarities reflect a shared tradition of folk astronomy across Asia, where mythological beings personify astronomical phenomena.

== Buddhist Culture ==
The myth demonstrates the fusion of animistic, Brahmanic, and Buddhist worldviews across Tai regions. Within Thai Buddhist cosmology, eclipses symbolize karmic imbalance and ignorance obscuring enlightenment. The act of the frog swallowing the Moon parallels Rahu’s act in Hindu-Buddhist lore, representing greed and attachment.

Through this synthesis, Kob Kin Duean serves as both cosmic explanation and moral allegory, reminding believers of impermanence and the victory of faith over darkness.

== See also ==
- Rahu
- Astrology
- Solar eclipse
- Lunar eclipse
- Thai folklore
- Grahana
