= Bhagavadh Vinayaga Temple, Kumbakonam =

Hindu temple in Kumbakonam

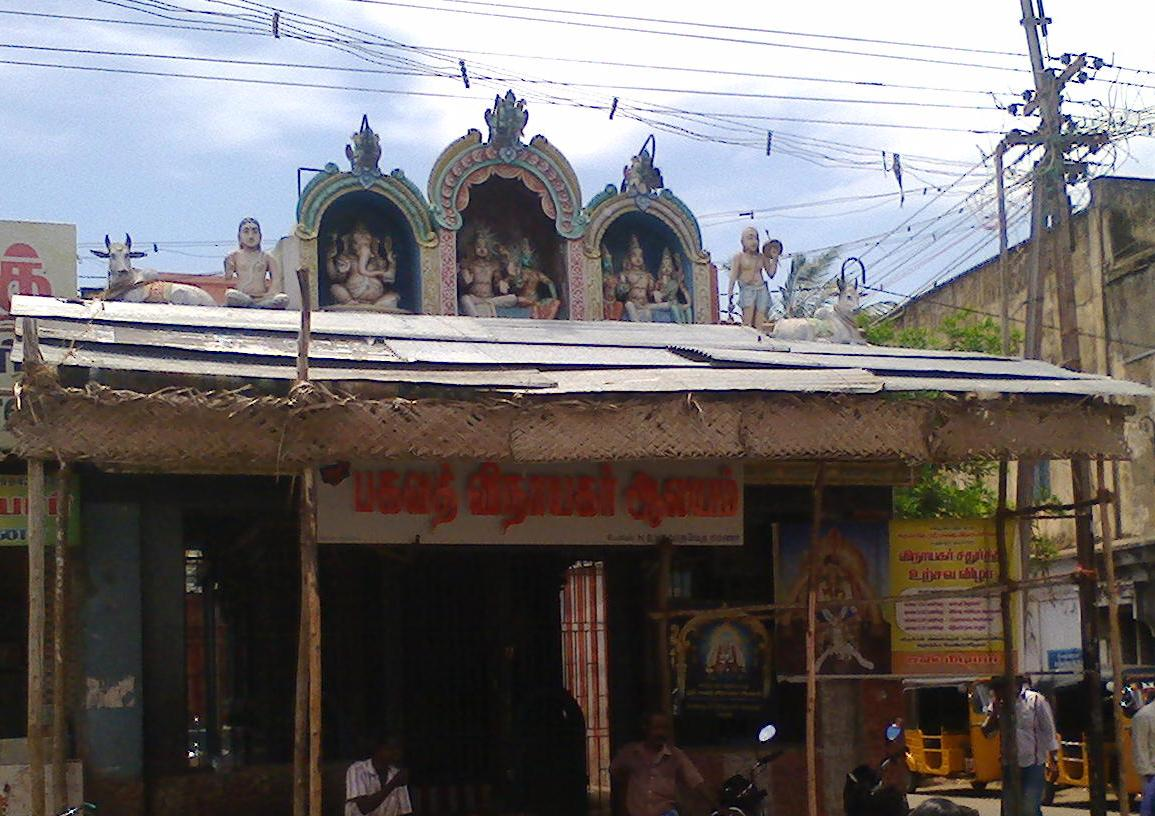
Bhagavadh Vinayaga Temple

Bhagavadh Vinayaga Temple (Tamil: கும்பகோணம் பகவத் விநாயகர் கோயில்) is a Hindu temple dedicated to the deity Vinayaka, located in the town of Kumbakonam in Thanjavur District Tamil Nadu, India.

== Location ==
This temple is located at Nagesvarar Tirumanchana Veedhi. This temple is known as Bhagavadh Vinayakar and Bhagava Vinayakar. The ghat connected with this temple and the Cauvery ghat are near the temple.

== History ==
Bhagavar Maharishi resided in Vedaranyam. His mother on her deathbed asked him to gather her ashes after her death and dissolve them in the place when they turned into flower. After her death he went to several places. When he came to Kumbakonam and was taking bath in Cauvery, his disciple opened the pot which contained the ashes. He thought it might have some food. To his surprise there were flowers instead of ashes. He kept mum, without telling anything to his guru. The guru was on the thinking that it would bloom only in Kasi. During his trip to Kasi he was shocked as ashes did not bloom into river. At that time his disciple narrated the incident which happened at Kumbakonam. Then he took them again to Kumbakonam and after his bath in the Cauvery, he saw ashes were turned into flower. Later he dissolved the ashes in the Cauvery. Then the guru and disciple discovered that Kumbakonam was more holy than Kasi and worshipped the Vinayaga. Since then the temple was known as Bhagavadh Vinayaga Temple.

== Presiding deity ==
The presiding deity Bhagavadh Vinayaga is very beautiful. He is also known as Gubera Vinayka and Vetri (Victory) Vinayaka. It is said that he would remove all the Navagraha Dhoshas. Locals believe that all the doshas (problems and sickness) would be wiped out if one worship the deity. Navagraha Vinayaga is also found in this temple. He is having Sun, (in his forehead), Moon (in navel), Mars (in right thigh), Mercury (in left lower hand), Jupiter (on the head), Venus (in left lower hand), Saturn (in right upper hand), Rahu (in left upper hand), and Kethu (in left thigh).

== Inscription ==
It is said that the renovation was done as early as in the year 1692. An inscription dating back to 1692 C.E. records about renovation of and the grants offered to the temple by one Konappadukai Thondaiman, during the reign of Tanjore Marattas.

== Festival ==
Vinayaka Chadurti is celebrated in a grand manner in this temple. During one Vinayagar chaturthi festival, the Vinayaka is decorated with Indian currency notes. Pujas are regularly in the temple. Special abishegas are also held.

== Kumbhabhishekham ==
The Kumbhabhishekham of the temple took place in 2006 and during 26 October 2015.
