= Grahana =

Sanskrit term for eclipse

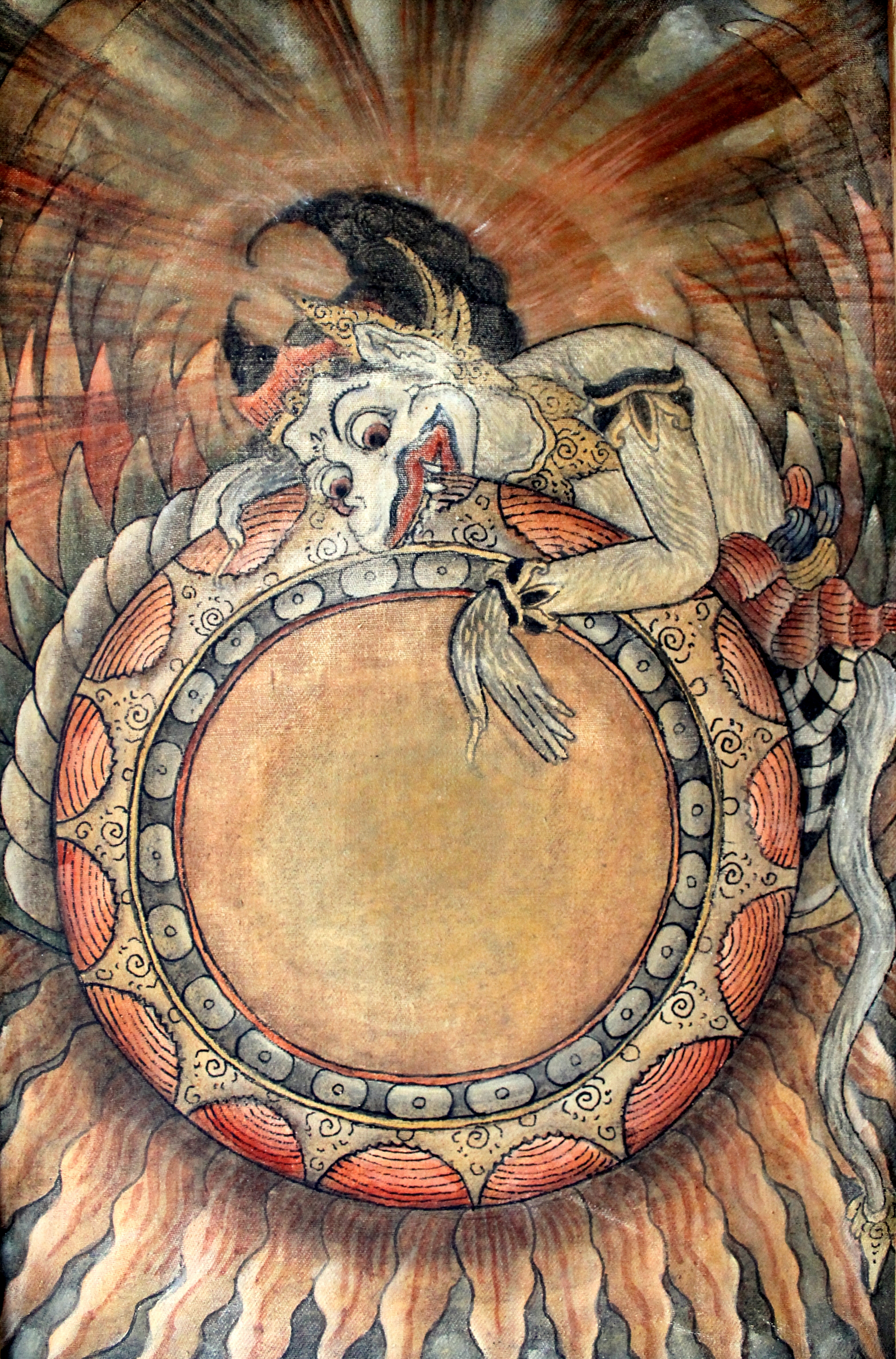
Rahu swallows the Sun, referred to as Rahukalam

Grahana (Sanskrit: ग्रहणं, romanized: Grahaṇam, lit. 'Eclipse') refers to the Sanskrit term for an eclipse. Eclipses are regarded to be noteworthy phenomena in Hinduism, and legends involving their origin and purpose are featured in Hindu mythology.

== Literature ==
In Hindu literature an eclipse is classified as either Suryagrahana (Sūryagrahaṇam), a solar eclipse, or a Chandragrahana (Candragrahaṇam), a lunar eclipse.

Beliefs surrounding eclipses are regarded by scholars to be closely associated with Vedic deities, and were significant in both astrology and astronomy. The origin of eclipses is explained in the Puranic legend of the Samudra Manthana, ("churning of the ocean"). When the asura named Rahu attempted to pose as a deva to receive amṛtam, the nectar of eternal life, Surya and Chandra, the Sun and Moon deities, alerted Mohini, the incarnation of Vishnu. Mohini promptly employed her discus to behead the asura, but he had already partaken the nectar, and had become immortal. Rahu's head was exiled to the heavens, and because the Sun and Moon deities played part in his decapitation, he is said to occasionally swallow them, causing the solar and the lunar eclipse.

In other texts, the eclipse is associated with Svarbhanu, who is sometimes identified as the asura whose head became Rahu. According to the Mahabharata, the sun god Surya is also described as an "enemy of Svarbhānu". Svarbhānu was said to strike both the Sun and Moon with arrows, the celestial bodies being revived by Atri as in the Rigveda.

The Skanda Purana recounts a legend where sages witness a forest-dwelling woman transform into a beauty after taking a bath in a holy lake during a solar eclipse, implying that it is a means of attaining salvation.

In the Padma Purana, it is stated that a man who offers water to his ancestors during a solar eclipse nourishes them, and achieves heaven; failing thus, he becomes a Chandala. This is because all water is said to be as holy as the Ganges during this period. All Brahmins become as venerable as the Sage Vyasa during this period. A present that is offered during a lunar eclipse is 100,000 effective; a present that is offered during a solar eclipse is 1,000,000 effective.

The Narada Purana offers computations regarding the predictions of solar and lunar eclipses, along with other astronomical events.

The Brahma Vaivarta Purana states that one who bathes during a full moon, an eclipse, and sacred occasions achieve the abode of Vishnu, Vaikuntha.

== Religious practices ==
There are a range of ritual observances associated with eclipses (grahana) in Hindu traditions. Food is often prepared only after the passing of the eclipse, and conventions regarding consuming meals at given hours in the context of the event are prescribed in the Kurma Purana. During the first and the final phases of an eclipse, a practising Hindu might ritually bathe to cleanse oneself, as well as offer prayers to one's ancestors. Pilgrimage sites situated adjacent to a river throng with devotees during the onset of a grahana in some regions. Pregnant women are considered to be especially at risk to the effects of an eclipse, and are expected to adhere more strictly to religious bans during the phenomenon to prevent birth deformities in their children. It is regarded to be an ill-omen to be born during an eclipse, and Brahmins are often called upon to ritually bless such an individual. On the other hand, a grahana is considered to be an auspicious time to practise chanting mantras that are believed to ward against evil.

== See also ==
- Eclipses in history and culture
- Rāhukāla
- Svarbhanu
- Rahu
- Ketu (mythology)
- Jyotiṣa
- Navagraha
