= Suka Temple =

Suka temple
- ଶୁକ ଦେଉଳ
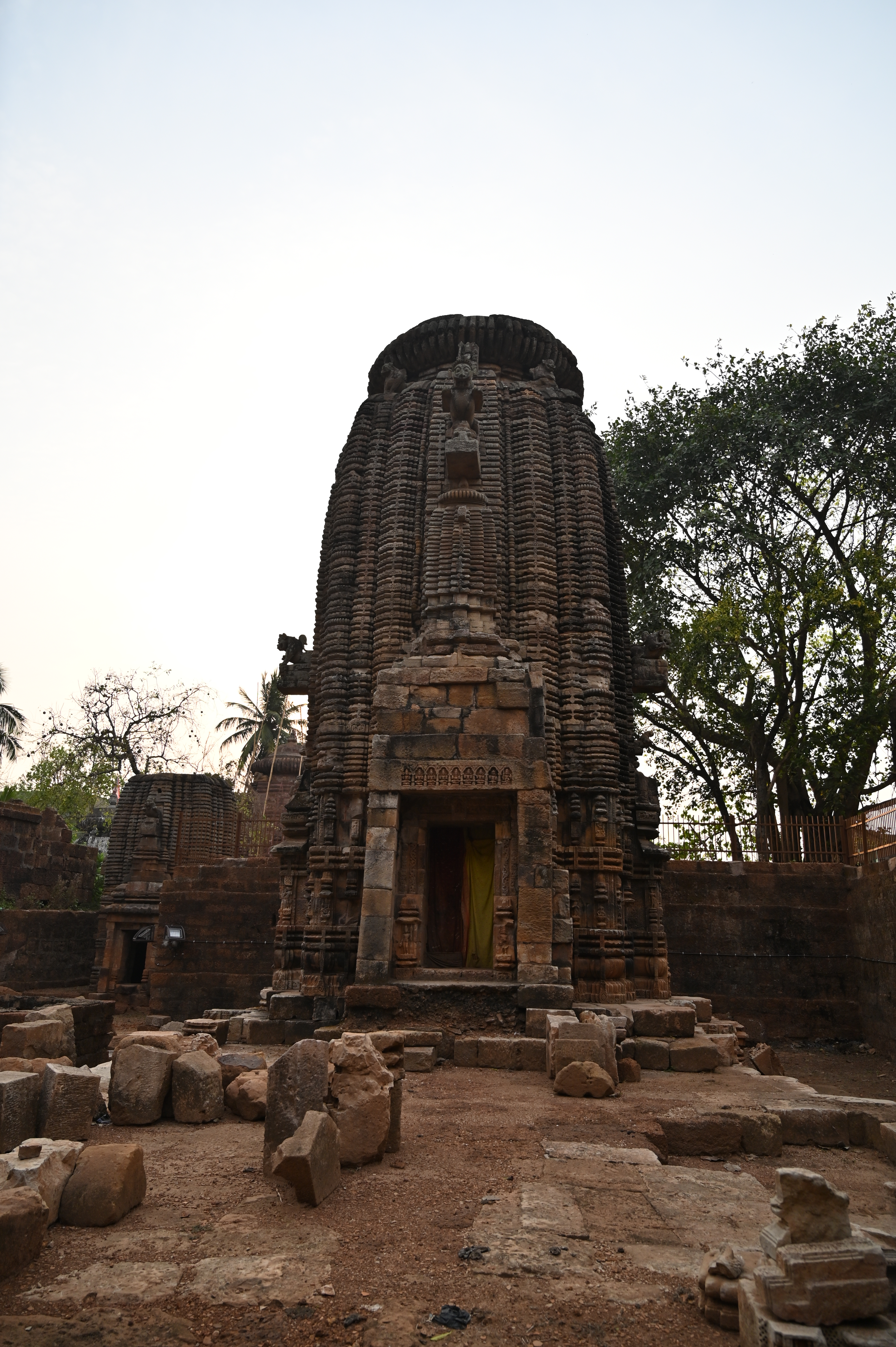

- Location in Odisha

Religion
- Affiliation: Hinduism
- District: Khorda
- Deity: Unknown

Location
- Location: Bhubaneswar
- State: Odisha
- Country: India
- Interactive map of Suka temple
- Coordinates: 20°14′23.39″N 85°50′3.57″E

Architecture
- Type: Kalingan Style (Kalinga Architecture)
- Completed: 13th century
- Elevation: 22 m (72 ft)

Suka Temple is an abandoned and unused temple in Bhubaneswar, the capital of Odisha, India. The temple is devoted to saptaratha and the presence of female counterparts of the dikpalas in the upara jangha. This was built in the matured phase of temple building tradition of Odisha.

== Location ==
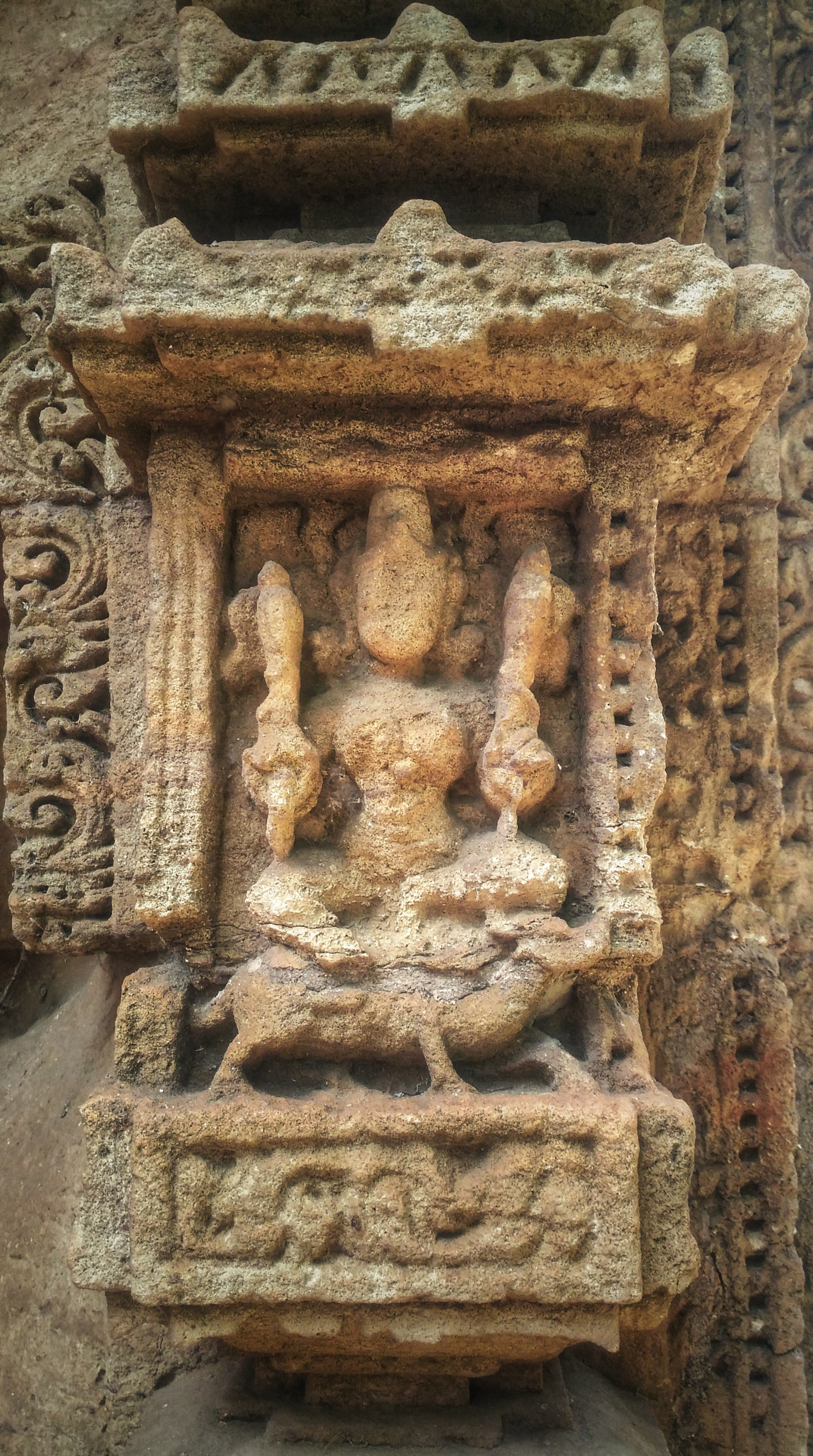
Devi inlaid on stone in Suka Sari temple, Bhubaneswar, Odisha

Suka temple is located in the Sankarananda Street, Uttaradaraja Badu Sahi, Old Town, Bhubaneswar. It is situated on the southern embankment of Bindusagar tank at a distance of 50 metres. The temple is facing towards west. The temple is not in use but sculptural embellishments on the exterior walls of the temple suggest that the temple was originally dedicated to Lord Siva. Though the temple is architecturally and sculpturally sound, it is abandoned and not in use. The temple is 1.80 metres below the present ground level.

== Age ==
- Precise date: 13th century A.D.
- Approximate date: Ganga rule

== Property Type ==
1. Precinct/ Building/ Structure/Landscape/Site/Tank: Building
2. Subtype: Temple
3. Typology: Rekha deul

== Significance ==
Historic significance: Matured phase of temple building tradition of Orissa.

== Physical description ==
1. Surrounding: The temple is surrounded by Bhabanisankara temple in east at a distance of 50 metres, Sankarananda Street in the right side of the compound wall, Sari deul in north and residential buildings in the south.
2. Orientation: The temple is facing towards west.
3. Architectural features (Plan & Elevation): On plan, the temple has a vimana and a renovated frontal porch. The vimana is saptaratha having a central raha which is flanked bypairs of anuraha, anuratha and kanika pagas on either sides. The vimana measures 5.80 square metres and the frontal porch measures 0.90 metres in length. The cella measures 2.40 square metres. On elevation, the vimana is in rekha order that measures 11 metres in height from bottom to the top. With fivefold divisions, the bada measures 3.50 metres. At the base the pabhaga, measuring 0.87 metres in height has five base mouldings of khura, kumbha, pata, kani and basanta. Tala jangha and upara jangha measure 0.72 metres each is being separated by three moulded bandhana measuring 0.32 metres. The baranda comprising ten mouldings measures 0.87 metres. The gandi and mastaka measures 5.00 metres and 2.50 meters respectively.

== Raha niche & Parsva devatas ==
As usual in the temples of mature phase, raha niches are located in the tala jangha on three sides, which are now empty. The empty niches measure 0.90 metres in height x 0.45 metres in width and 0.23 metres in depth.

== Decorative features ==
At the base of the gandi, there is a bigger rekha angasikhara whose mastaka is almost touching to the udyota simha in the raha paga. The gandi is decorated with chaitya motifs and scroll designs. In conjunction between Raha and anuratha paga, lotus designs are found in succession from baranda to beki. The temple is ten storied as distinguished by the ten bhumi-amlas in the kanika paga. Each bhumi has four bhumi barandis. Khura is decorated with stylized chaitya motifs and the other four mouldings of pabhaga are carved with scroll works. Beneath the raha niche tala garbhika of khakhara design are found which is flanked by naga-nagi pilasters on either sides.

The raha niches are decorated with floral designs and two female figures on either sides of the niche. In the lintel niche, Gaja-lakshmi is seated in lalitasana. Architrave of the niche is decorated with a series of ducks. The raha niche is surmounted by a khakahra mundi which is decorated with series of elephants and scroll works. Kalasa above the khakhara mundi is crowned by a Gajakranta. Gandi is decorated with tiers and scroll work design. Tala jangha and upara jangha are decorated in the mundi niches. Bandhana has three mouldings and is decorated with scroll works and jali motifs. Gaja vyalas are found in the paga conjunctions of tala jangha. While in the tala jangha dikpalas are found on their respective mounts and attributes in the uppara jangha their female counterparts are depicted with usual iconographic features. Jagrata motifs are also found in the conjunction of vimana and frontal porch. In the beki, bekibhairavas are found right above the raha and do-pichha lions in the corners. Doorjamb: The doorjambs measuring 2.00 metres x 1.45 metres have three vertical bands of puspa sakha, nara sakha and lata sakha from exterior to interior. At the lalatabimba, gaja-lakshmi is seated on padmasana. The dvarapala niches at the base of the jambs measuring 0.35 metres x 0.16 metres house Saivite dvarapalas holding trident in their left hand and right hand in varada mudra. Lintel: The architrave above the doorjambs measuring 2.13 metres in length is carved with the navagrahas. Ravi is holding lotus in his both hands, Rahu holding half moon and Ketu in serpent tail.

== Condition description ==
Repaired by the Orissa State Archaeology under X & XI Finance Commission Award.

== Grade (A/B/C) ==
1. Architecture: A
2. Historic: C
3. Associational: C
4. Social/Cultural: C

== See also ==
- List of temples in Bhubaneswar
