= Mettukulam =

Coordinates: 12.920219°N 79.133306°E

Mettukulam Village is situated in the fort city of Vellore, India. The village lies between Vellore (10 km) and Chitoor (26 km) and the temple towns of Thiruvannamalai and Tirupati. Nearby are several colleges, ancient temples and the Christian Medical College and Hospital.

== Maha Muthumariamman Temple ==
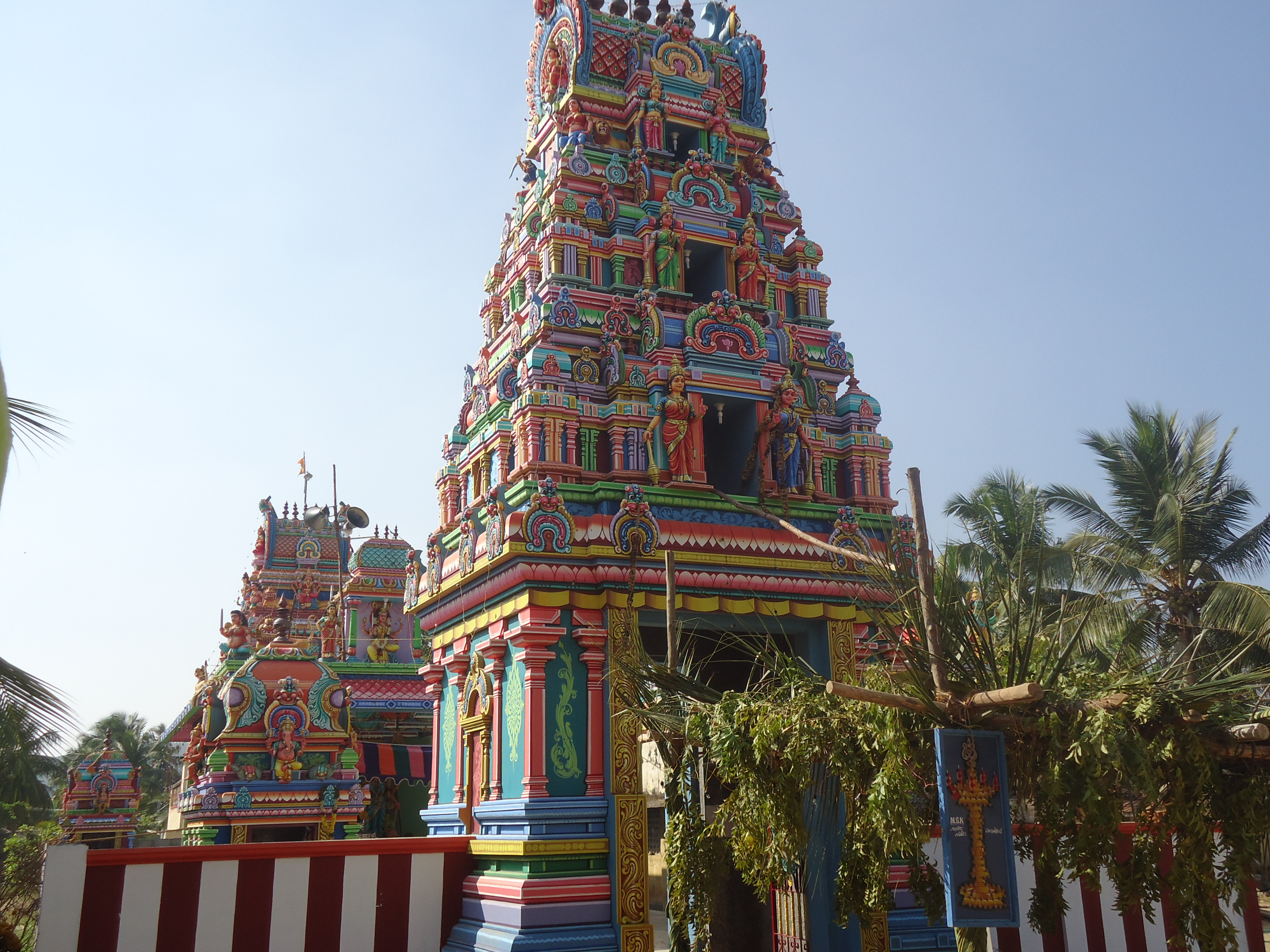
Mahamuthumariamman Temple

The supreme Goddess is worshiped in this temple in the incarnation of Sri Mahamuthumariamman. The temple complex additionally houses shrines of Lord Mahaganapathy, Lord BalaMuruga and Navagrahas (9 Planets), all housed in independent sanctums.

== Schools ==
- Kingston College of Engineering
- St.Xavier's Higher Secondary School
- Sunbeam Matriculation Higher Secondary School
- Mettukulam R.T.O Checkpost
- Fiitjee global school
