= Svarbhānu =

Hindu mythological character associated with the eclipse

Svarbhanu
- Asura of solar and lunar eclipses; original combined form of Rahu and Ketu
- Affiliation: Asura, Rahu and Ketu
- Abode: Patala
- Planet: North and south lunar node
- Gender: Male

Genealogy
- Parents: Viprachitti (father); Simhika (mother)
- Children: Indumati (wife of Ayus and Mother of Nahusha)

Svarbhānu (Sanskrit: स्वर्भानु, lit. 'Splendour of Radiance') is an asura traditionally held responsible for solar eclipses and lunar eclipses in Vedic mythology. The name is also used as an attribute of the asuras Rahu and Ketu in Puranic mythology, who are also connected to the solar eclipse and the lunar eclipse.

== Legend ==
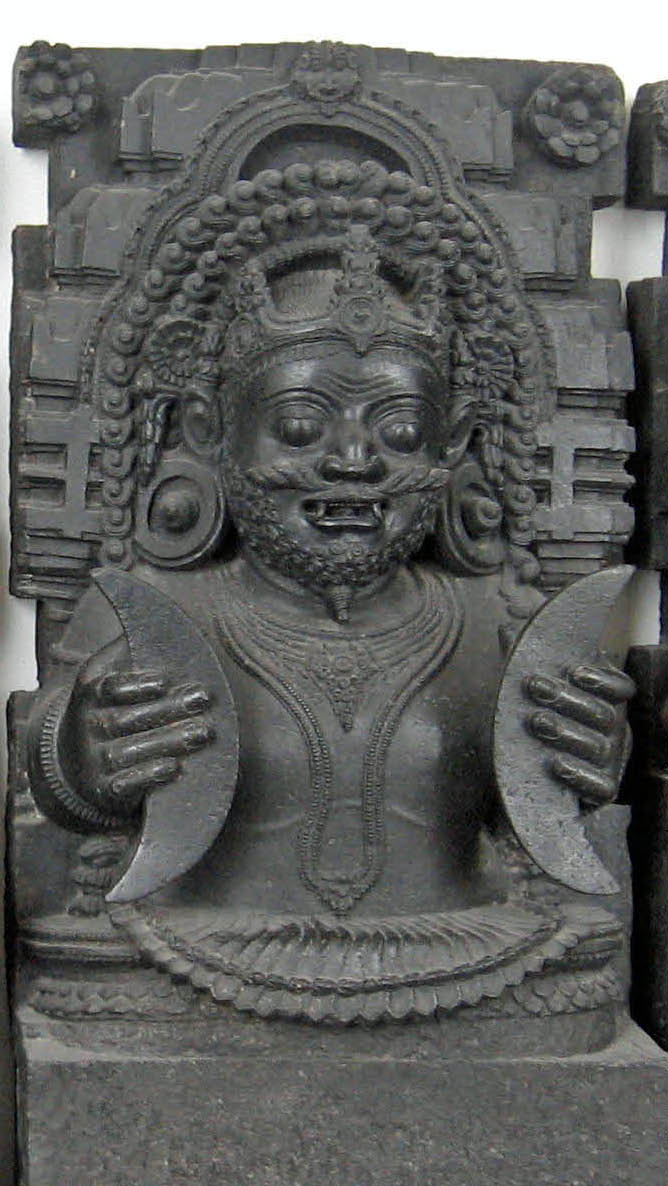
Rahu

Svarbhānu is described as an asura twice in the Family Books of the Rigveda. Svarbhānu is described to strike Surya, overshadowing the sun with darkness. Stella Kramrisch considers this act as portraying Svarbhānu as a deity greater than the Sun. The Rigveda further narrates after this, the king of heaven - Indra struck down Svarbhānu and sage Atri found the hidden Sun and replaced it in the sky. Svarbhanu again appears in the Yajurveda and the Brahmanas. According to the Brahmanas, Svarbhānu with darkness pierced Āditya (the Sun), whom, however, the gods set free by means of svara (accents).

An assistant of Shukra (Venus), Svarbhānu was also the teacher of the asuras. He deceitfully quaffed the amrita proffered by Mohini, thereby achieving immortality as two beings despite being beheaded immediately after: his head as Rahu and his body as Ketu.

According to the Mahabharata, the sun god Surya is also described as an "enemy of Svarbhānu". Svarbhānu was said to strike both the sun and moon with arrows, the celestial bodies being revived by Atri as in the Rigveda.

According to the text Hari-vaṃśa, Svarbhānu ushered Kalanemi through the galaxy. In a Purana, Svarbhānu is described as a son of the goddess Siṃhikā (marjar or cat) ('Little Lioness').

== See also ==
- Rāhu
- Grahana
