= Drubchen =

Tibetan Buddhist meditation retreat

A drubchen is a traditional form of meditation retreat in Tibetan Buddhism that lasts for about ten days. It involves a large number of lay and monastic practitioners and is led by at least one High Lama. It is regarded as a very powerful practice, and is said to act as a remedy to the negative forces at work in the world, and to promote inner personal peace, peace within the community and world peace.

Tibetan Buddhists traditionally regard attendance at a drubchen as producing the same benefit as practising alone for seven years. The practice requires prayers and the drubchen mantra to be recited by practitioners for twenty-four hours a day throughout the period of the retreat.

In addition, the lamas present sometimes also prepare large quantities of a herbal medicine known as dutsi, which is said to promote physical and spiritual wellbeing.
