= Amrutha =

Amrutha may refer to:

- Amrutha Iyengar (born 1996), Indian actress
- Amrutha Srinivasan (born 1993), Indian actress
- Amrutha Vaani, a 2007 Indian film

== See also ==
- Amrita
