= Amrita =

Nectar of immortality in Hinduism and used as a metaphor in Buddhism

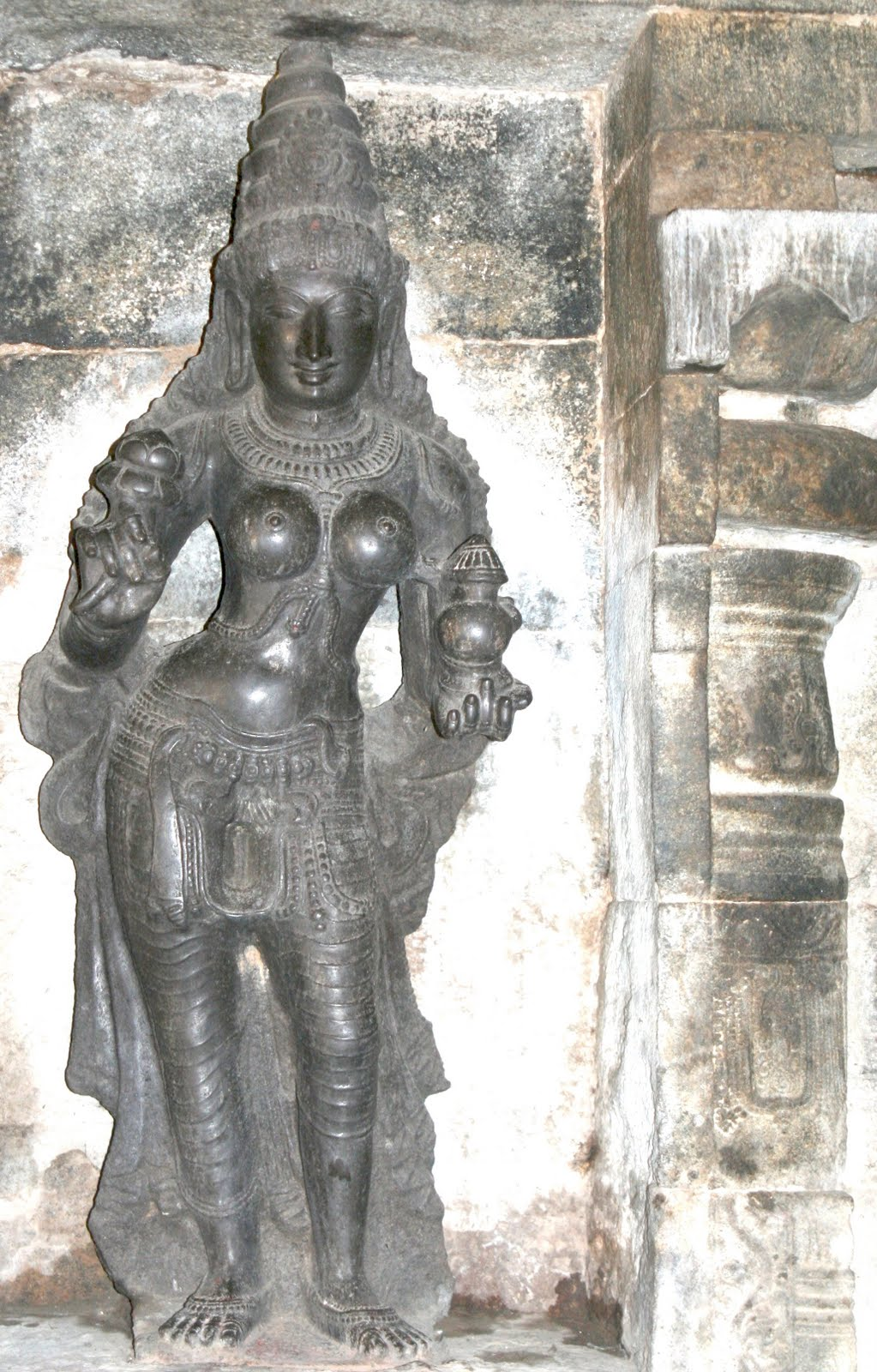
Mohini, the female form of Vishnu, holding the pot of amrita, which she distributes amongst all the devas, leaving the asuras without it. Darasuram, Tamil Nadu, India

Amrita or Amruta (Sanskrit: अमृत, IAST: amṛta), also rendered Amrit or Amata in Pali (also known as Sudha, Amiy, or Ami) is a concept in Indian religions denoting "immortality" and, by extension, the nectar or elixir of immortality. The term is cognate with, and shares similarities with, ambrosia, both deriving from a common Proto-Indo-European source. Its earliest occurrence is in the Rigveda, where amrita is one of several terms associated with soma, the drink of the devas. It also occupies a central place in the account of the Samudra Manthana, in which possession of amrita and the immortality it confers becomes the object of conflict between the devas and the asuras.

The meaning and use of amrita vary among the Indian religions. In Sikhism, amrit has several closely related senses. "Taking amrit" (amrit chhakana) refers to receiving initiation (amritsanskar) in the khaṇḍe-dī-pāhul ceremony, using sweetened baptismal water. According to Sikh tradition, Guru Gobind Singh first prepared amrit in 1699 to initiate the Khalsa. During the preparation of amrit for the Sikh naming ceremony, only the first five verses of the Japji Sahib are recited.

In popular Sikh usage, amrit may also denote holy water believed to possess healing properties, particularly water that has been placed near the Ādi Granth during a pāṭh (reading). In the Ādi Granth the term is also used metaphorically to suggest both immortality and sweetness, especially as the result of meditation upon God's name (nām simaran), as in the expression "Ambrosial (amrit) is the True Name" (Ādi Granth 33). The expression amrit velā denotes the hour before dawn, regarded as especially precious for prayer.

Amrit is also a common personal name among Sikhs and Hindus, with the feminine form Amritā.

== Etymology ==
Amrita is composed of the negative prefix, अ a from Sanskrit meaning 'not', and mṛtyu meaning 'death' in Sanskrit, thus meaning 'not death' or 'immortal/deathless'.

The concept of an immortality drink is attested in at least two ancient Indo-European languages: Ancient Greek and Sanskrit. The Greek ἀμβροσία (ambrosia, from ἀ- “not” + βροτός “mortal”) is semantically linked to the Sanskrit अमृत (amṛta) as both words denote a drink or food that gods use to achieve immortality. The two words appear to be derived from the same Indo-European form *ṇ-mṛ-tós, "un-dying" (n-: negative prefix from which the prefix a- in both Greek and Sanskrit are derived; mṛ: zero grade of *mer-, "to die"; and -to-: adjectival suffix). A semantically similar etymology exists for Greek nectar, the beverage of the gods (Greek: νέκταρ néktar) presumed to be a compound of the PIE roots *nek-, "death", and -*tar, "overcoming".

== Historical Vedic religion and Hinduism ==
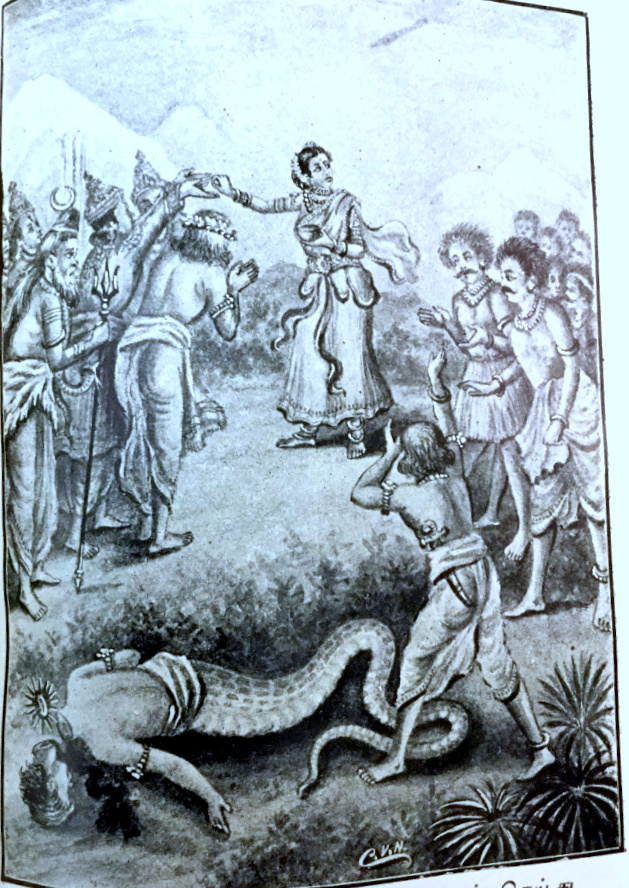
Vishnu took the form of the beauty Mohini and distributed the amrita to devas. When Svarabhānu tried to steal the amrita, his head was cut off.

Amrita is repeatedly referred to as the drink of the devas, which grants them immortality. Despite this, the nectar does not actually offer true immortality. Instead, by partaking it, the devas were able to attain a higher level of knowledge and power, which they had lost due to the curse of the sage Durvasa, as described in the Samudra Manthana legend. It tells how the devas, after the curse, begin to lose their immortality. Assisted by their rivals, the asuras, the devas begin to churn the ocean, releasing, among other extraordinary objects and beings, a pitcher of amrita, held by the deity Dhanvantari.

Brahma enlightens the devas regarding the existence of this substance:

O Devas, in the northern division and on the northern bank of the ocean of milk there is a most excellent place called Amrita (nectar): so the wise say. Go there and being self-controlled practise hard austerities. There you will hear most sacred, purified words relating to Brahman grave like the muttering of clouds surcharged with water in the rainy season. That celestial speech is destructive of all sins and was spoken by the god of gods of pure soul. So long as your vow will not terminate you will hear that great universal speech. O gods, you have come to me and I am ready to grant you boons. Tell me what boon you do want.

— Harivamsa Purana, Chapter 43

When the asuras claim the nectar for themselves, Vishnu assumes the form of the enchantress Mohini, and her beauty persuades the asuras to crudely offer her the task of its distribution:

Seeing that beautiful form, they were fascinated and were overwhelmed with the passion of love. Giving up their mutual struggle, they approached and spoke:

“O blessed lady! Take this pitcher of Nectar and distribute it amongst us. We are the sons of Kaśyapa; O lady with beautiful buttocks, make us all drink it (Nectar).”

Requesting her thus, they handed it over to the lady who was reluctant. She spoke, “No faith should be entertained in me, as I am a self-willed (i.e. wanton) woman. You have done an improper act. I shall, however, distribute it as per my will.” Though she told them so, those stupid ones said, “Do as you please”.

— Skanda Purana, Chapter 13

When the danava Rahu disguised himself as a deva and sat in the clan's row to partake in consuming the nectar, Surya and Chandra alerted Mohini of his presence. Mohini sliced his head off with her Sudarshana Chakra, and continued to distribute the nectar to every single one of the devas, after which she assumed her true form of Narayana and defeated the asuras in a battle.

== In Ayurveda ==
In Ayurvedic medicine, the term Amrita is frequently used to describe potent, life-giving herbs with rejuvenating (Rasayana) properties. In the foundational text, the Charaka Samhita, Amrita is a primary synonym for Guduchi (Tinospora cordifolia), which is an herb, celebrated for its immune-boosting and restorative rejuvenating qualities. The text classifies such herbs as vital for promoting longevity, vitality, and resilience against disease, mirroring the traditional concept of a life-preserving nectar in a clinical context.

== Sikhism ==
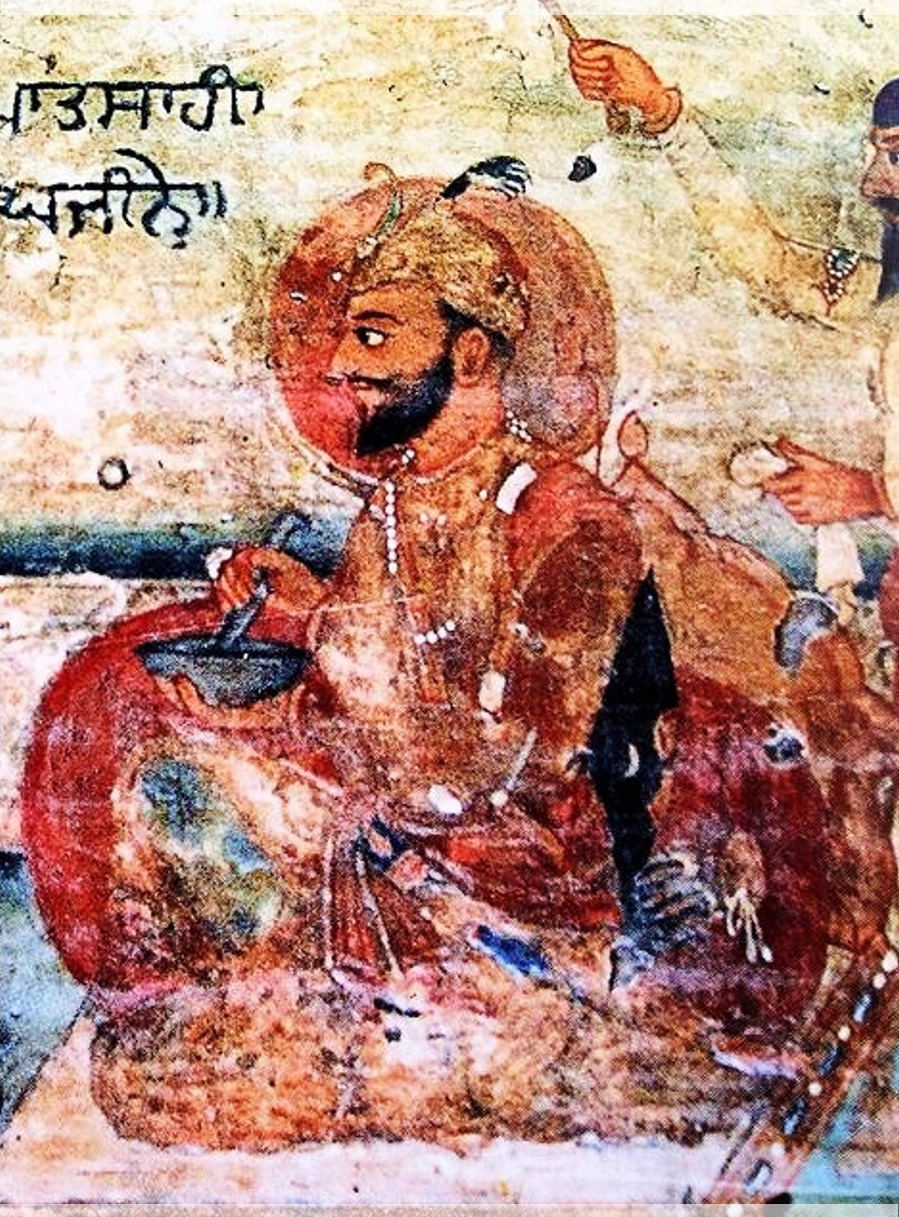
Old Sikh fresco art from the Akal Takht, Amritsar of Guru Gobind Singh preparing Amrit

In Sikhism, amrit (Punjabi: ਅੰਮ੍ਰਿਤ) is the name of the holy water used in Amrit Sanchar, a ceremony which resembles baptism. This ceremony is observed to initiate the Sikhs into the Khalsa and requires drinking amrit. This is created by mixing a number of soluble ingredients, including sugar, and is then rolled with a khanda with the accompaniment of scriptural recitation of five sacred verses.

Metaphorically, God's name is also referred to as a nectar:

ਅੰਮ੍ਰਿਤ ਸਬਦੁ ਅੰਮ੍ਰਿਤ ਹਰਿ ਬਾਣੀ ॥
Amrit sabad amrit hari bāṇī.
The Shabda is Amrit; the Lord's bani is Amrit.

ਸਤਿਗੁਰਿ ਸੇਵਿਐ ਰਿਦੈ ਸਮਾਣੀ ॥
Satiguri sēviai ridai samāṇī.
Serving the True Guru, it permeates the heart.

ਨਾਨਕ ਅੰਮ੍ਰਿਤ ਨਾਮੁ ਸਦਾ ਸੁਖਦਾਤਾ ਪੀ ਅੰਮ੍ਰਿਤੁ ਸਭ ਭੁਖ ਲਹਿ ਜਾਵਣਿਆ ॥
Nānak amrit nāmu sadā sukhdātā pī amritu sabha bhukh lahi jāvaṇiā.
O Nanak, the Ambrosial Naam is forever the Giver of peace; drinking in this Amrit, all hunger is satisfied.

== Buddhism ==
Amṛta (Pali: amata; Tibetan: ’chi med/bdud rtsi; Chinese: 甘露; pinyin: gānlù, rōmaji: kanro) symbolizes immortality, liberation, and spiritual purity. The term describes the "nectar" or "ambrosia" of the Trāyastriṃśa heaven, a divine substance consumed by gods (devas) to confer immortality. This association extends to Buddhist teachings, which are often referred to as the "sweet rain of Dharma" (dharmavarṣam amṛtam).

In doctrinal contexts, amṛta often refers to the ultimate goal of spiritual practice: liberation (vimokṣa). Nirvāṇa is described as "deathless," likened to an elixir that brings serenity and clarity to the enlightened person. Practitioners are said to metaphorically and physically "touch the deathless element" during profound spiritual experiences.

Amṛta is also associated with healing substances, including the five divine nectars (pañcāmṛta): milk, ghee, butter, honey, and sugar. In Tibetan Buddhism, these are incorporated into tantric rituals, where they are transformed into offerings in a skull cup (kapāla). Pills made from amṛta (bdud rtsi ril bu) are sometimes distributed by religious figures for spiritual and physical benefits.

=== Theravada Buddhism ===
According to Thanissaro Bhikkhu, "the deathless" refers to the deathless dimension of the mind which is dwelled in permanently after nibbana.

In the Amata Sutta, the Buddha advises monks to stay with the four Satipatthana: "Monks, remain with your minds well-established in these four establishings of mindfulness. Don't let the deathless be lost to you."

In the questions for Nagasena, King Milinda asks for evidence that the Buddha once lived, wherein Nagasena describes evidence of the Dhamma in a simile:

"Revered Nagasena, what is the nectar shop of the Buddha, the Blessed One?"

"Nectar, sire, has been pointed out by the Blessed One. With this nectar the Blessed One sprinkles the world with the devas; when the devas and the humans have been sprinkled with this nectar, they are set free from birth, aging, disease, death, sorrow, lamentation, pain, grief and despair. What is this nectar? It is mindfulness occupied with the body. And this too, sire, was said by the Blessed One: 'Monks, they partake of nectar (the deathless) who partake of mindfulness that is occupied with the body.' This, sire, is called the Blessed One's nectar shop."

— Miln 335

=== Chinese Buddhism ===
Chinese Buddhism describes Amrita (Chinese: 甘露; pinyin: gānlù) as blessed water, food, or other consumable objects often produced through merits of chanting mantras.

=== Vajrayana Buddhism ===
Amrita (Tibetan: བདུད་རྩི་, Wylie: bdud rtsi, THL: dütsi) also plays a significant role in Vajrayana Buddhism as a sacramental drink consumed at the beginning of all important rituals such as the abhisheka, ganachakra, and homa. In Tibetan tradition, dütsi is made during drubchens – lengthy ceremonies involving many high lamas. It usually takes the form of small, dark-brown grains taken with water, or dissolved in very weak solutions of alcohol and is said to improve physical and spiritual well-being.

The foundational text of traditional Tibetan medicine, the Four Tantras, is also known by the name The Heart of Amrita (Wylie: snying po bsdus pa).

The Immaculate Crystal Garland (Wylie: dri med zhal phreng) describes the origin of amrita in a version of the samudra manthana legend retold in Buddhist terms. In this Vajrayana version, the monster Rahu steals the amrita and is blasted by Vajrapani's thunderbolt. As Rahu has already drunk the amrita he cannot die, but his blood, dripping onto the surface of this earth, causes all kinds of medicinal plants to grow. At the behest of all the Buddhas, Vajrapani reassembles Rahu who eventually becomes a protector of Buddhism according to the Nyingma school of Tibetan Buddhism.

Inner Offering (Wylie: Nang chod, Chinese: 内供) is the most symbolic amrita offering assembly, and the Inner Offering Nectar Pill (Wylie: Nang chod bdud rtsi rilbu, Chinese: 内供甘露丸) is a precious and secret medicine of Tibetan Buddhism, which are only used internally for higher-ranking monks in Nyingma school. Its ingredients including Five Amrita and Five Meat, which represents five buddhas, and five elements respectively. According to Tantras of Chakravarti, and Tantras of Vajravārāhī, a ceremony needs to be held for melting and blessing the Inner-Offering Nectar. Five Amrita needs the following substances are arranged in the five cardinal directions: yellow excrement in the east; green bone marrow in the north; white semen in the west; red blood in the south; and blue urine placed in the center. The Four Nectars should come from wise monks and the ova should be collected from the first menstruation of a blessed woman. The Five Meats are arranged similarly: the meat of a black bull in the southeast; the meat of a blue dog in the southwest; the meat of a white elephant in the northwest; the meat of a green horse in the northeast, and the meat of a red human corpse in the center. After the ceremony, these ingredients will transform into a "one taste" (ekarasa) elixir, which bestows bliss, vitality, immortality and wisdom. Actual modern practitioners will take a "synthesized essence" of the Nectar Pill and combine it with energy drinks and alcohol, but mostly the "Nectar Pill" are derived from plants.

== See also ==
- Ameretat
- Ambrosia
- Amrutha (disambiguation)
- Elixir of Life
- Panchamrita
- Peaches of Immortality
- Potion
- Soma
- Traditional Tibetan medicine

== Sources ==
- Dallapiccola, Anna L. Dictionary of Hindu Lore and Legend. ISBN 0-500-51088-1
