= Rahu =

Hindu deity representing ascending lunar node

- Solar eclipses and North Lunar Node; Head of Svarbhanu
- Member of Navagraha
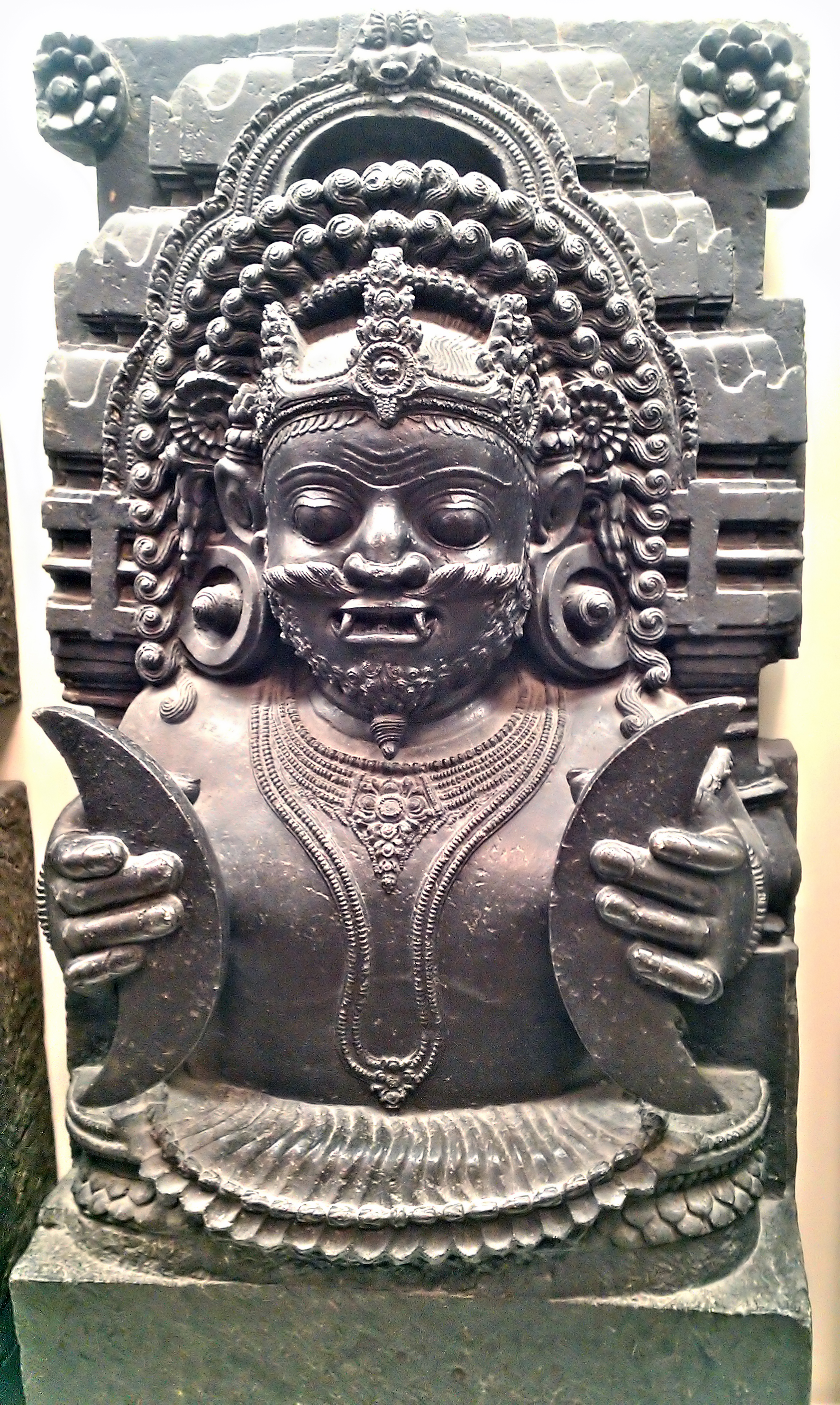
- 13th-century sculpture of Rahu from Konark
- Devanagari: राहु
- Sanskrit transliteration: rāhu (The point of intersection of ascending node of lunar orbit with the elliptic plane of Earth's orbit)
- Affiliation: Graha, Asura, Svarbhanu
- Abode: Rāhu Kāla
- Mantra: Om Viprachitti putra Simhika putra Om Navagraha Rahuya Namah
- Weapon: Sceptre
- Day: Saturday, Rāhu Kāla
- Number: 4, 13, 22, 31
- Mount: Black Lion
- Festivals: Amavasya or Rāhu Kāla

Genealogy
- Parents: Viprachitti (father); Simhika (mother)
- Siblings: Ketu
- Consort: Nāgavalli and Nāgakanni or Karali

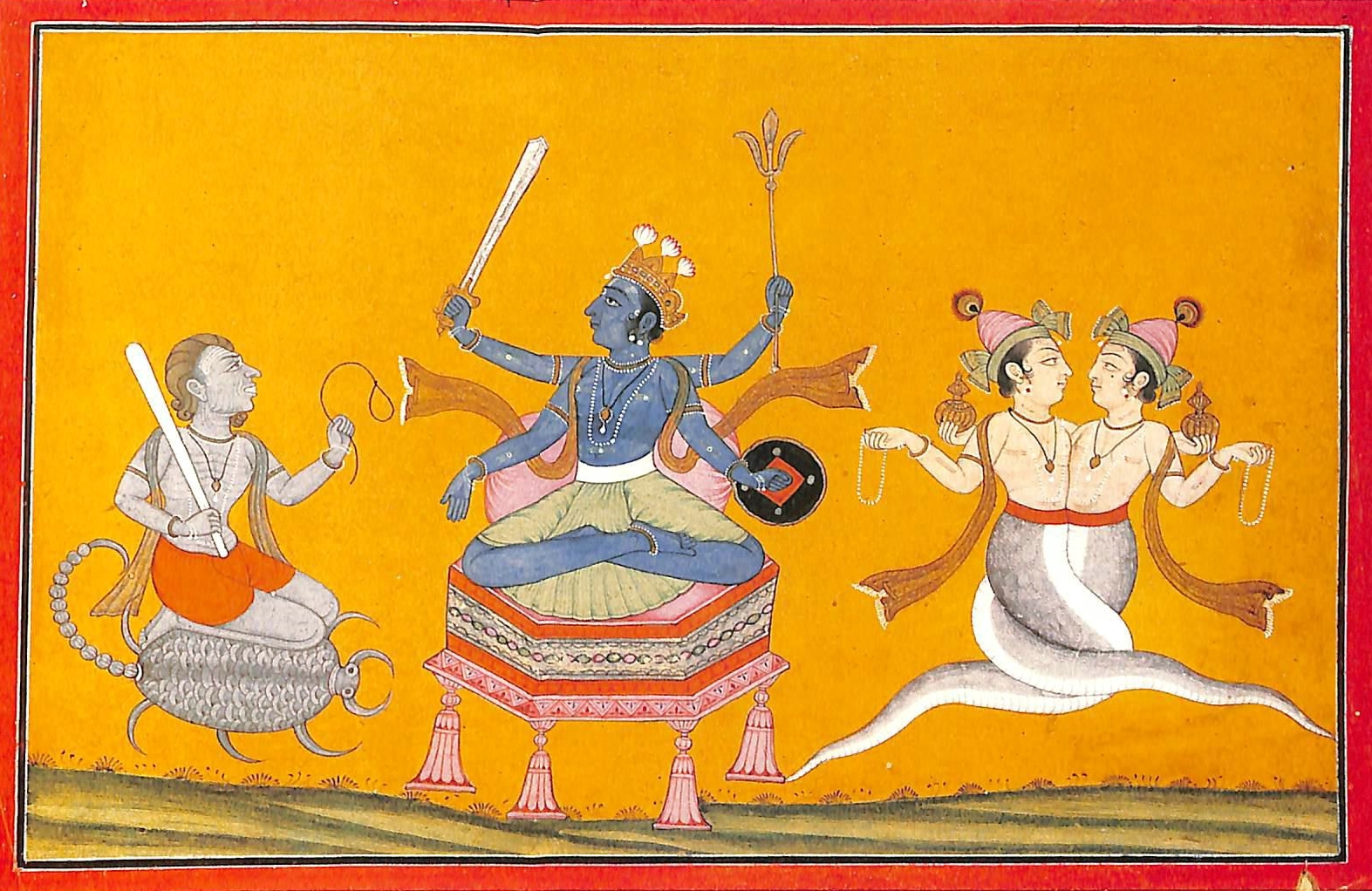
The Planet Rahu and other Astral Figures, painting by the Mahesh of Chamba (fl. c. 1730 - 1770). Rietberg Museum

Rāhu (Sanskrit: राहु,) is one of the nine major celestial bodies (navagraha) in Hindu texts and the king of meteors. It represents the ascension of the Moon in its precessional orbit around the Earth, also referred to as the north lunar node, and along with Ketu, is a "shadow planet" that causes eclipses. Despite having no physical existence, Rahu has been allocated the status of the planet by ancient seers owing to its strong influence in astrology.

Rahu is usually paired with Ketu, the south lunar node. The time of day considered to be under the influence of Rahu is called Rāhu kāla and is considered inauspicious.

As per Hindu astrology, Rahu and Ketu have an orbital cycle of 18 years and are always 180 degrees from each other orbitally (as well as in the birth charts). This coincides with the precessional orbit of the Moon or the ~18 year rotational cycle of the lunar ascending and descending nodes on the Earth's ecliptic plane. This also corresponds to a saros, a period of approximately 223 synodic months (approximately 6585.3211 days, or 18 years, 11 days, 8 hours), that can be used to predict eclipses of the Sun and Moon. Rahu rules the zodiac sign of Aquarius together with Shani (traditional ruling planet).

Astronomically, Rahu and Ketu denote the points of intersection of the paths of the Sun and the Moon as they move on the celestial sphere. Therefore, Rahu and Ketu are respectively the personification in Hindu astrology of north and the south lunar nodes. Eclipses occur when the Sun and the Moon are at one of these points, giving rise to the understanding of swallowing of the Sun and the Moon by the snake. When the sun conjoins either node on the ecliptic, the new moon will obscure sunlight causing a solar eclipse, and the full moon's light will be blighted by the earth's shadow causing the lunar eclipse.

Nakshatras ruled by Rahu are Ardra, Swati, and Shatbhisha.

== Legends ==
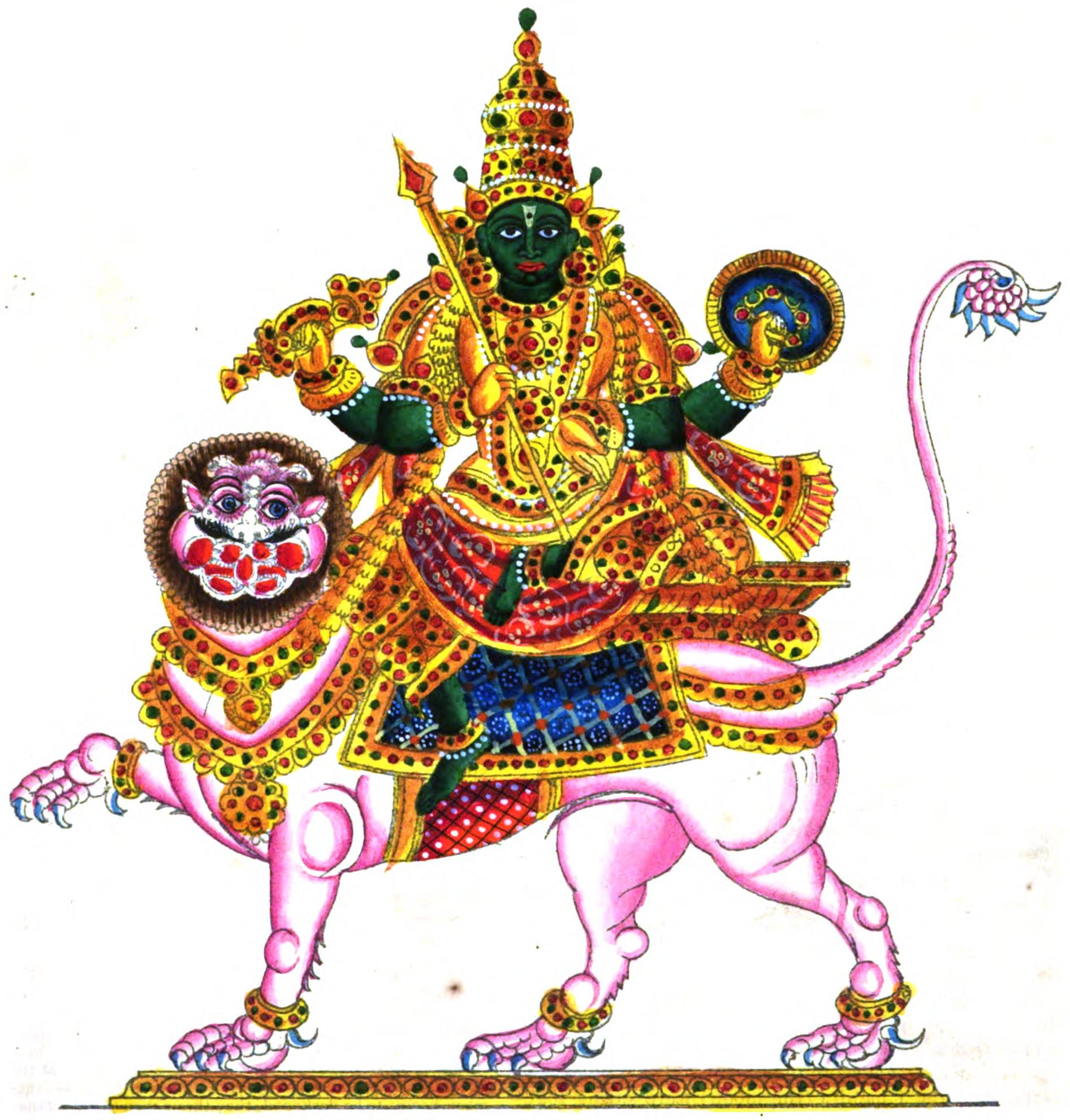
Depiction of Rahu from the 1842 book The Complete Hindoo Pantheon by E. A. Rodrigues

Rahu is mentioned in the Puranic texts. The tales begin in the "remotest periods of the earliest of time, when the devas and asuras churned the ocean of milk to extract from it the amrita, the elixir of immortality." Mohini, the female avatar of Vishnu, started distributing amrita to the devas. However, one of the asuras, Svarbhanu, sat in the row of devas and drank the amrita. Surya and Chandra noticed him and they informed Mohini; however, by that time, Svarbhanu had already become immortal. Vishnu, as Mohini, cut off Svarbhanu's head with his discus, the Sudarshana Chakra. Svarbhanu, henceforth referred to as Rahu and Ketu, could not die, but his head was separated from his body; his head came to be known as Rahu, while his body came to be known as Ketu. Following this event, Rahu and Ketu gained the status of planets, and could influence the lives of humans on Earth. Rahu and Ketu became bitter enemies with Surya (Sun) and Chandra (Moon) for exposing his deception and leading to his decapitation. For this, Rahu pursues them and attempts to consume the Sun and Moon. Since Rahu is the head without the body, the Sun and Moon exit from his throat when he tries to swallow them. This recurring cycle creates the grahana, an eclipse of the Sun and the Moon, which represents the temporary revenge of Rahu.

=== Solar Eclipse and Atri's sons ===
The Rig Veda mentions that during a solar eclipse, the sons of Atri were conflicted and succeeded in freeing Surya.

=== Jalandhara ===
Following his ascent to power, the asura Jalandhara was advised by the great sage Narada to seek out a consort. Narada hinted that the beautiful Parvati, consort of Shiva, would be an excellent choice. Infatuated with her beauty and impaired in his judgment, Jalandhara summoned his emissary Rahu, and sent him to the mountain Kailasa, to demand that Shiva give up his wife to Jalandhara. Rahu delivered the message informing Shiva that being a humble yogi who lived in the cremation grounds and the jungle as a naked ascetic, he was unworthy of the fairest goddess. He added that since Jalandhara was the powerful new lord of the heavens, the underworld, and the Earth, he was more worthy of her. Upon hearing these insults, Shiva produced a thunderous sound and a great lion-like monster from his brow named Kirtimukha. The monster chased and seized Rahu with the intention of devouring him. Rahu pleaded with Shiva for his life and retracted his claims, instead praising Shiva and seeking protection and refuge with him. In response, Shiva called off Kirtimukha’s attack and set Rahu free to relay these events back to Jalandhara.

=== Hanuman ===
When Hanuman was an infant, he was once left unattended by his earthly mother and father. He became hungry, and when the Sun rose, he believed it to be a ripe fruit. So, Hanuman leapt up towards the Sun with extreme speed. Vayu, the wind god and his celestial father, blew cold wind on him to protect him from the burning Sun. Coincidentally, Rahu was meant to swallow the Sun and eclipse it that day. As Rahu approached the Sun, he saw Hanuman about to eat it. Hanuman saw Rahu and thought Rahu to be a fruit as well, so he attempted to eat him too. Rahu fled to the court of the king of the devas, Indra, and complained that while he was meant to satisfy his hunger with the Sun, there was now a bigger Rahu who tried to consume the Sun and himself. Indra set out on Airavata, his divine elephant, to investigate alongside Rahu, who retreated once more when he saw how enormous Hanuman had grown. Hanuman was playing with the Sun's chariot and reached for Rahu again. As Rahu cried out to Indra for help, Hanuman saw the Airavata and mistook it for yet another fruit. When he approached in his giant form, Indra struck his left jaw with a thunderbolt and injured him. Hanuman began falling back towards the Earth when he was caught by Vayu. Furious over his son's injury, Vayu withdrew all the air from the universe until all the devas, the asuras, and men began to suffer and suffocate. They appealed to Brahma, who revealed the cause of their distress and accompanied them to the wind god in order to appease him. Brahma revived Hanuman, and the other deities took turns bestowing different blessings, boons, and powers upon him.

== Astrology ==
Rāhu (Sanskrit: राहु,) is one of the nine major celestial bodies (navagraha) in Hindu in astrology. Since Rahu and Ketu are two opposite lunar nodes, they always appear in diametrically opposite houses in horoscopes. Both nodes are always in retrograde motion.

Due to the obscuration caused by eclipse phenomena, Rahu in Hindu astrology may be associated with themes such as deceit, delusion, corruption, impiety, materialism, hedonism and toxicity. Rahu is associated with swindlers, jokers, criminals, and afflictions such as addiction and trauma. In more favorable configurations Rahu may signify elements of science, technology, ecology, entertainment, counterculture, humor and craft.Like Ketu, Rahu is also an enemy of the Sun and Moon. It is generally considered as a malefic planet in astrology.

Rahu rules the zodiac sign of Aquarius together with Shani (traditional ruling planet). He is exalted in the astrological sign of Gemini, finds itself comfortable in Virgo, Taurus, Libra and Capricorn. In Jyotish techniques of Vimshottari Dasha, Rahu has rulership over the Nakshatra of Ardra, Swati, and Shatabhisha.

Jyotisha, the Hindu astrology, entails the concepts of Nakshatra (see also List of Natchathara temples), Navagraha (see also List of Navagraha temples), and Saptarishi (included in the list of Hindu deities whose dedicated temples are found at various Hindu pilgrimage sites to which Hindus take yatra).

== Buddhist culture ==
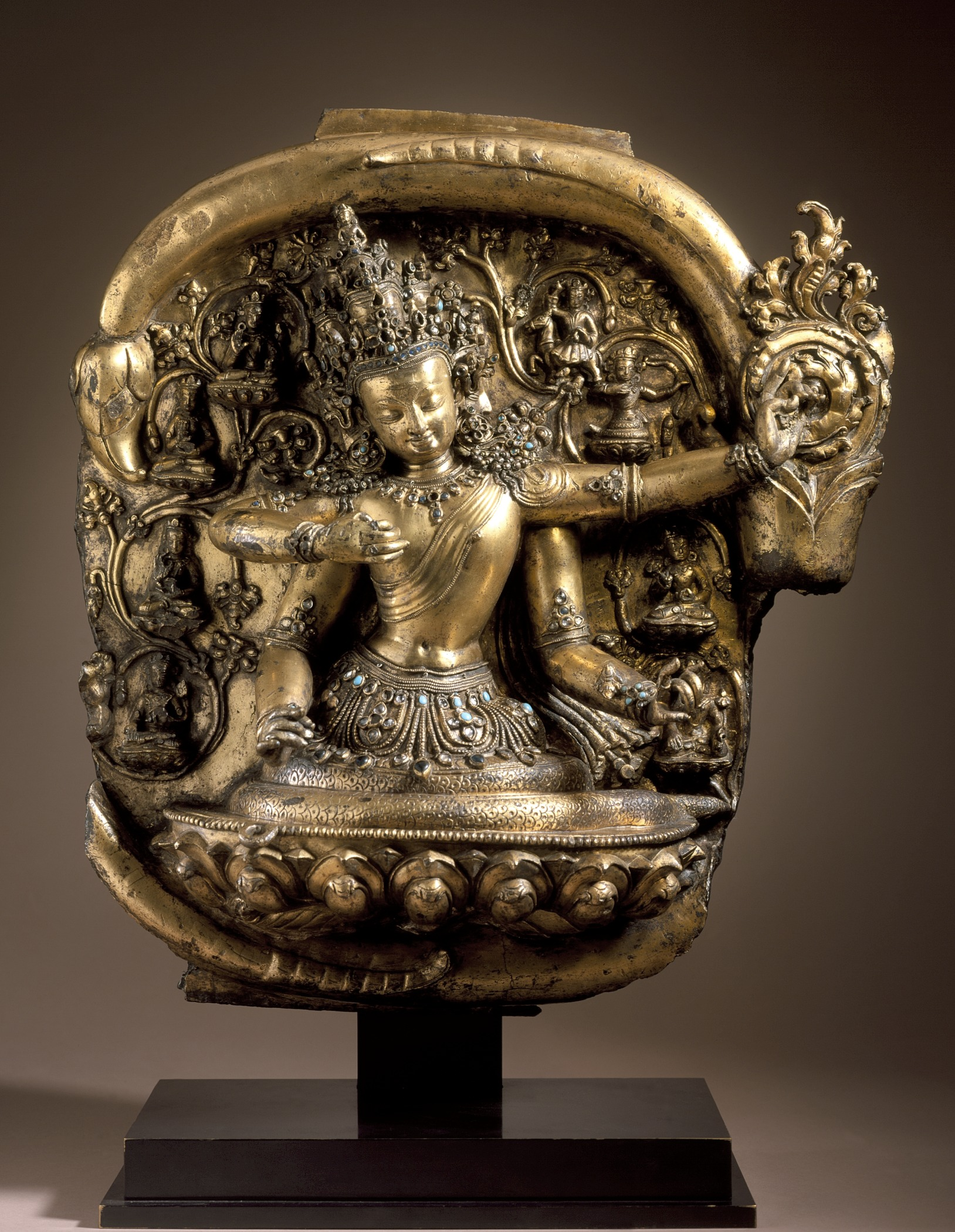
Metal icon of Rahu from the Densatil Monastery in Tibet, circa 1400 CE

Rāhu is mentioned explicitly in a pair of scriptures from the Samyutta Nikaya of the Pali Canon. In the Candima Sutta and the Suriya Sutta, Rahu attacks Surya, the Sun deity and Chandra, the Moon deity before being compelled to release them by their recitation of a brief stanza conveying their reverence for the Buddha. The Buddha responds by enjoining Rāhu to release them, which Rāhu does rather than have his "head split into seven pieces". The verses recited by the two celestial deities and the Buddha have since been incorporated into Buddhist liturgy as protective verses recited by monks as prayers of protection.

== Gallery ==
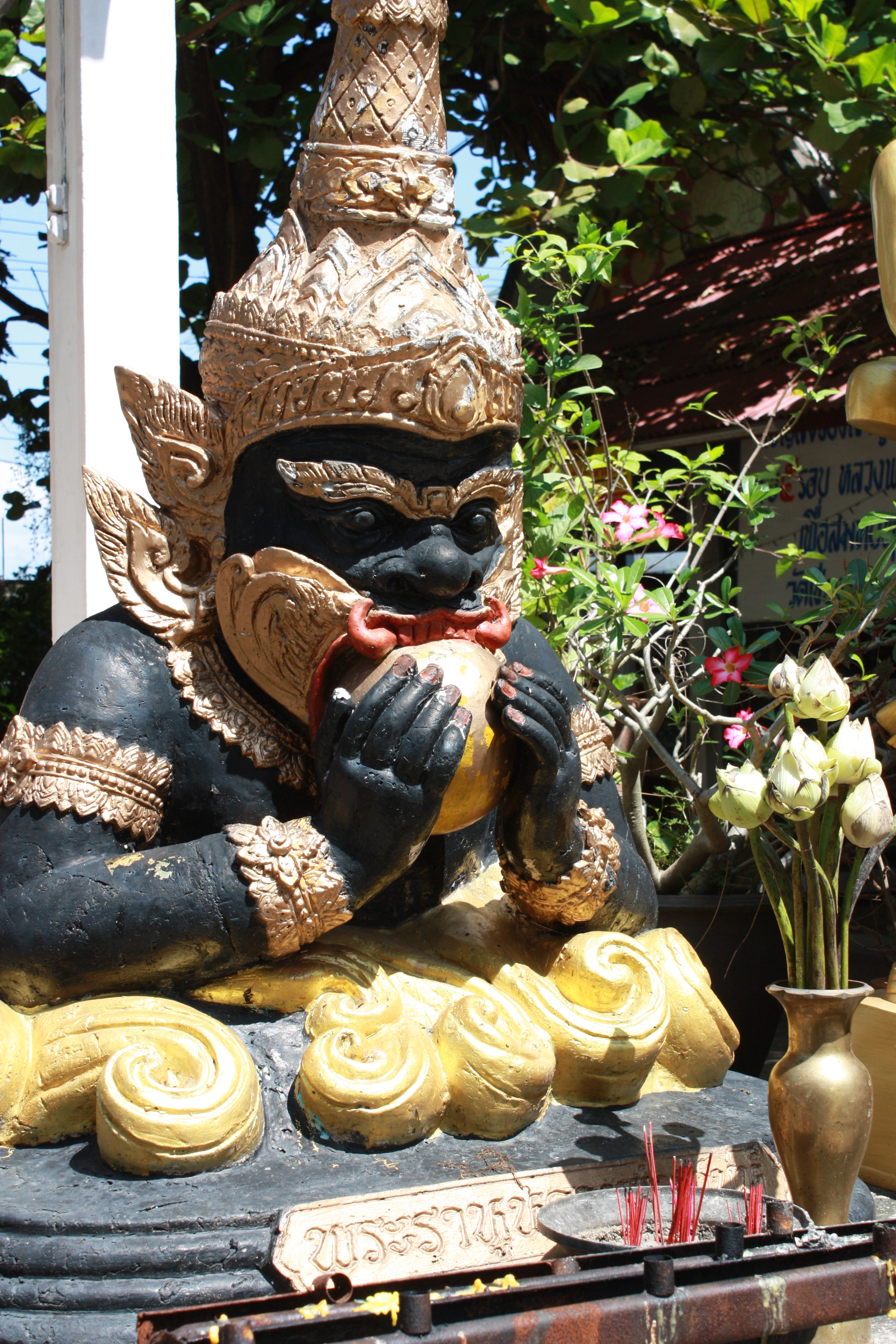
Phra Rahu in Thailand

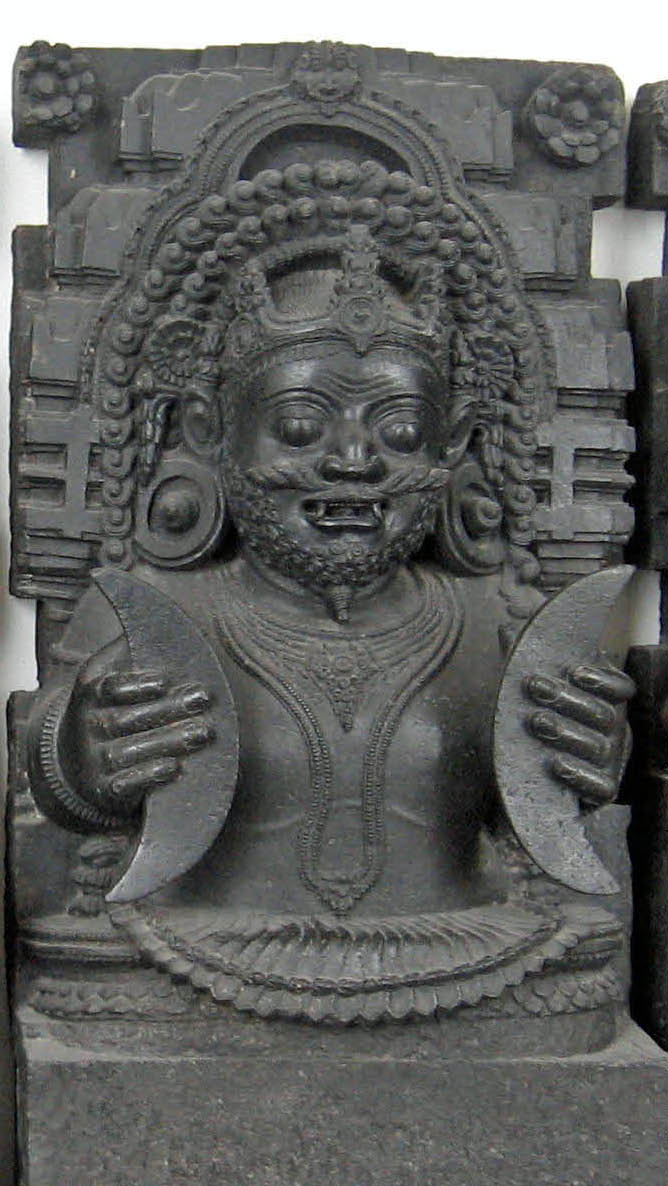
Rahu statue at The British Museum

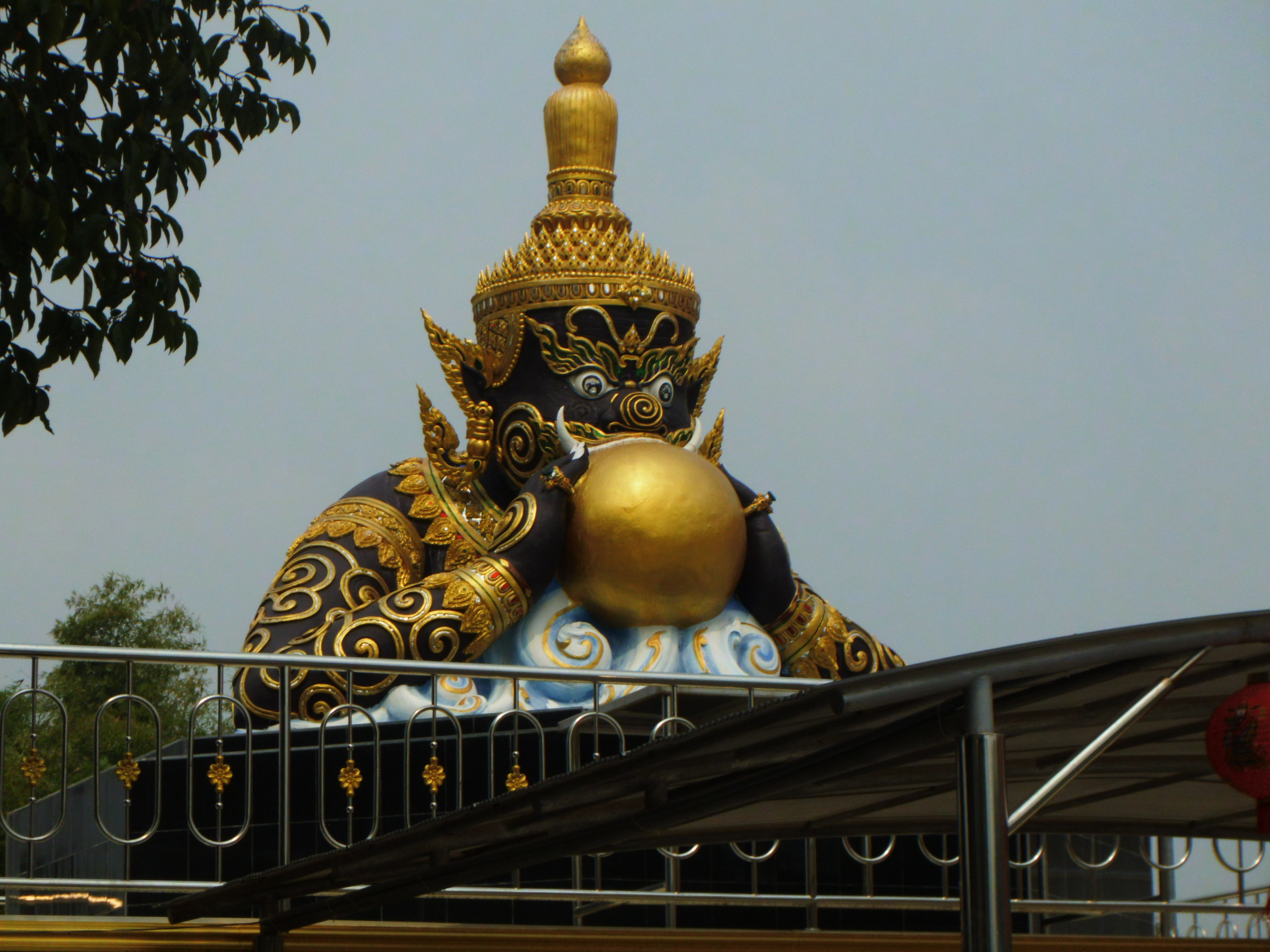
Rahu eclipsing the Moon statue in Thailand

== See also ==
- Nuwa
- Hati Hróðvitnisson
- Kirtimukha
- Svarbhanu
- Saros
- Orbital node
- Batara Kala
- Sköll
- Equinox (celestial coordinates) – Astronomical location
