= Viprachitti =

Asura featured in Hindu texts

In-universe information
- Spouse: Holika
- Children: Svarbhanu (Rahu and Ketu)
- Relatives: Kashyapa (Father) Danu (Mother)

Viprachitti is a danava featured in Hindu literature, a son of Kashyapa and Danu. The Vishnu Purana states that Danu gave birth to thirty-three powerful asuras, among whom Vipracitti was the eldest, with Shambara and others as his younger brothers. According to the Mahabharata, he becomes the king of the Danavas after his brother Puloman was killed by Indra. Viprachitti marries Holikā, who is the sister of Hiranyakashipu and a daughter of Diti. The Mahabharat also states that when Vishnu took the form of Vamana to measure the three worlds, Viprachitti along with the other asuras surrounded him. The Mahabharata's Adi Parva states that Viprachitti was reborn as the demon Jarasandha in his next life.

== See also ==
- Vemacitrin
- Danava
- Svarbhanu
