= Simhika =

Rakshasi in Hindu mythology

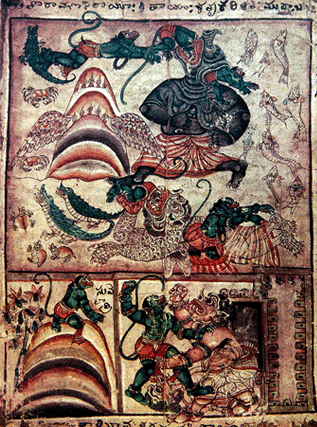
- Hanuman encounters Simhika and Surasa.
- Affiliation: Rakshasa
- Texts: Ramayana

Simhika (Sanskrit: सिंहिका, romanized: Siṃhikā) is a rakshasi in Hinduism. She appears in the Ramayana, as a foe of the Vanara, Hanuman, by whom she is slain.

== Legend ==
In the Ramayana, after meeting Mainaka and Surasa, when Hanuman was crossing the ocean to Lanka, the kingdom of the Rakshasa king Ravana, Simhika was hiding in the ocean. She captured the flying birds shadow and ate them up. Even as he flew overhead, she captured Hanuman's shadow with her magic. According to one account, forewarned about this creature by Sugriva, Hanuman expanded his size, and observed her vulnerability when she followed suit. He turned himself small and allowed her to swallow him, ripping her apart from within, slaying her before he resumed his journey. In other accounts, he merely kicked her to death.

== In popular culture ==
- Portrayed by Sudha Chandran in 2016–2018 Indian epic drama Karmaphal Daata Shani
