= Ketu (mythology) =

Hindu deity representing descending lunar node

- Lunar eclipses, South Lunar Node; Body of Svarbhanu
- Member of Navagraha
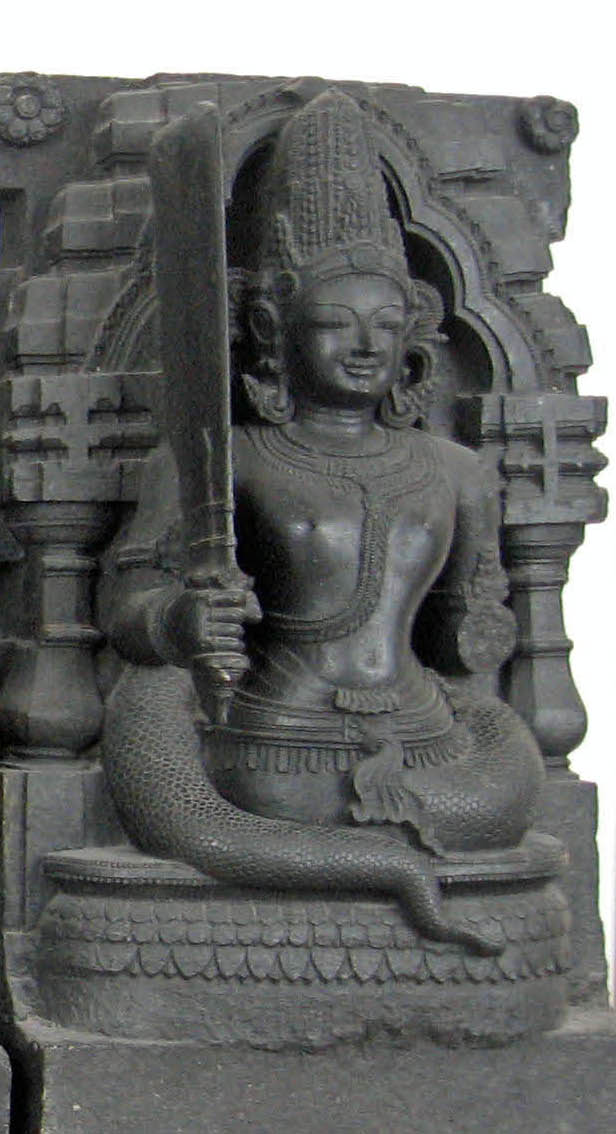
- 13th-century sculpture of Ketu from British Museum
- Sanskrit transliteration: केतु
- Affiliation: Graha, Asura, Svarbhanu
- Abode: Ketuloka
- Mantra: Oṃ Viprachitti Putra Simhika Putra Om Navagraha Ketave Namaḥ
- Weapon: Spear
- Number: 7,16 and 25
- Mount: Vulture

Genealogy
- Parents: Viprachitti (father), Simhika (mother)
- Siblings: Rāhu
- Consort: Chitralekhaand Dhoomra

Ketu (Sanskrit: केतु, IAST: Ketú) is the descending (i.e. 'south') lunar node in Hindu astrology. Personified as a deity, Rāhu (the ascending (i.e. 'north') lunar node) and Ketu are considered to be the two halves of the immortal asura (demon) Svarbhanu, who was beheaded by the God Vishnu.

As per Vedic astrology, Rāhu and Ketu have an orbital cycle of 18.6 years and are always 180 degrees from each other orbitally (as well as in the birth charts). This coincides with the precessional orbit of moon or the 18.6-year rotational cycle of the lunar ascending and descending nodes on the earth's ecliptic plane. Ketu rules the Virgo zodiac sign together with Budha (traditional ruling planet; Mercury in Western astrology).

Astronomically, Rāhu and Ketu denote the points of intersection of the paths of Surya (the Sun) and Chandra (the Moon) as they move on the celestial sphere, and do not correspond to a physical planet. Rāhu and Ketu are respectively names of the north and the south lunar nodes. Eclipses occur when the Sun and the Moon are at one of these points, giving rise to the story that these are being swallowed by the Rāhu/ Ketu. Ketu is believed to be responsible for causing the lunar eclipse.

== Astrology ==
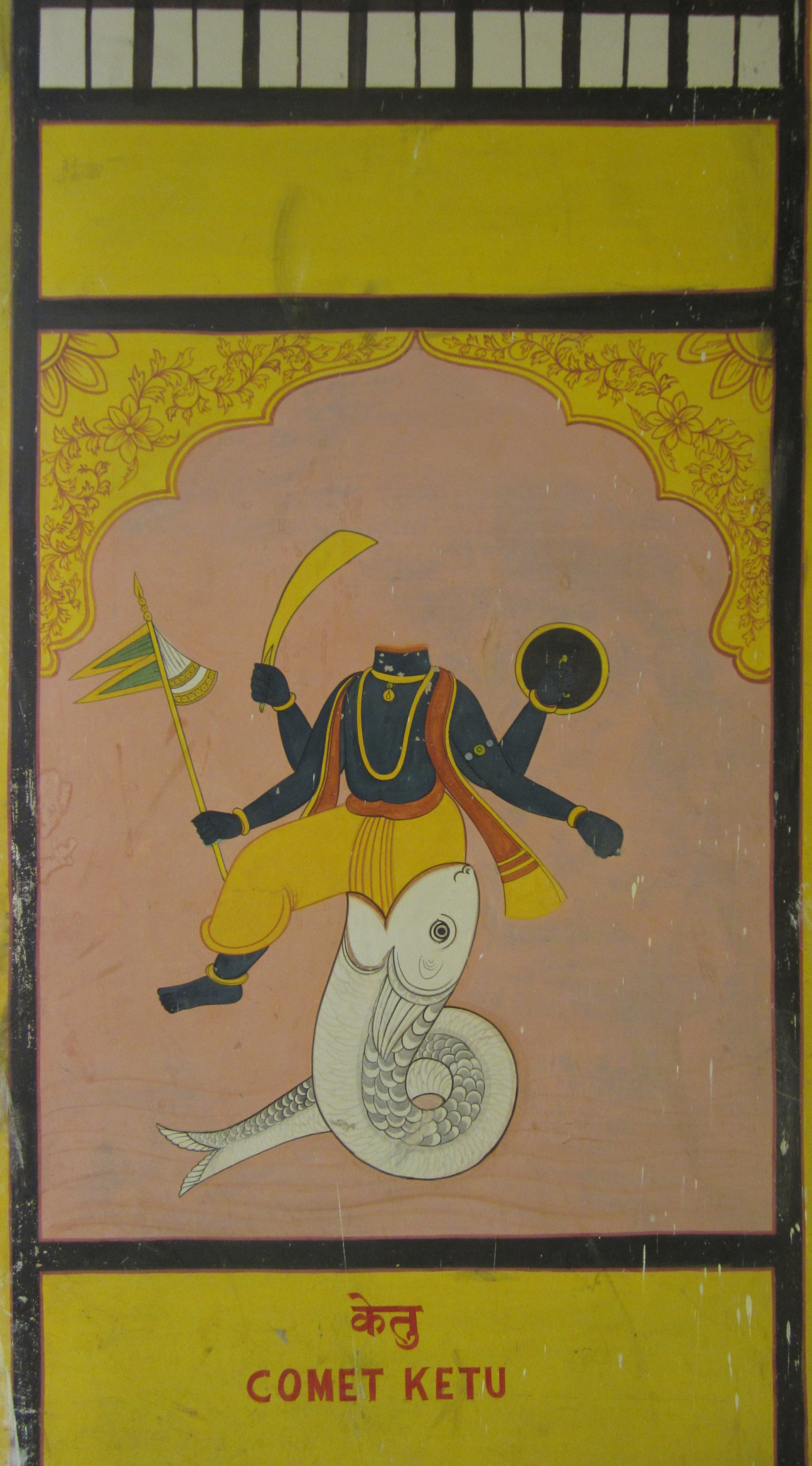
A mural of Ketu. Depicted as the body without head. from Jawahar Kala Kendra, Jaipur

In Hindu astrology, Ketu represents karmic collections both good and bad, as well as spirituality and supernatural influences. Ketu signifies the spiritual process of the refinement of materialisation to the spirit and is considered both malefic and benefic: this process causes sorrow and loss, and yet at the same time turns the individual to God. In other words, it causes material loss in order to force a more spiritual outlook in the person. Ketu is a karaka or indicator of intelligence, wisdom, non-attachment, fantasy, penetrating insight, derangement, and psychic abilities. Ketu is believed to bring prosperity to the devotee's family, and removes the effects of snakebite and illness arising out of poisons. He grants good health, wealth and cattle to his devotees. Ketu is the lord of three nakshatras or lunar mansions: Ashvini, Magha and Mula.

Ketu is considered responsible for moksha, sannyasa, self-realization, gnana, a wavering nature, restlessness, the endocrine system and a short, fat physique.

In Hindu astrology, individuals influenced by Ketu are believed to achieve significant spiritual development.

Rāhu, being a karmic planet, shows the necessity and urge to work on a specific area of life where there had been ignorance in the past life. To balance the apparent dissatisfaction one has to go that extra mile to gain a satisfactory settlement in the present lifetime. Rāhu can remove all negative qualities of every planet, while Ketu can emphasise every positive quality of the planet.

Ruler: According to the popular astrology text Brihat Parashara Hora Shastra (BPHS), if looking for solutions regarding Ketu, consider working with mantra of Ganesha & Matsya.

Exaltation and Debilitation: This has been a debatable point in astrology, as per BPHS Ketu is exalted in the sign of Scorpio and debilitated in Taurus. However, many astrologers have disputed this and most modern astrologers now seem to agree that Ketu is exalted in Sagittarius and debilitated in Gemini. This stands to logic as Ketu is a torso and a prominent part of Sagittarius is a big horse torso attached to a male upper body, although Kujavat Ketu is the popular saying, Kuja denoting Mars so it's still held that a Scorpio placed Ketu is dignified.

Negative Significations: Ketu is considered malefic and has been mostly associated with negative things. Most people consider it a difficult planet as it manifests as obstacles on the material plane. However Lord Ganesha mantras can help remedy those issues because Ganesha is the presiding deity of Ketu. Ketu often brings a sense of complete detachment, losses, mindlessness, wandering, and confusion in one's life.

Positive Significations: There is a much deeper side to Ketu and it has been called the most spiritual of all planets. Ketu has been considered the planet of enlightenment and liberation. It is the one who has “lost his head (worldly senses = Tattva (Ayyavazhi))”, being a personification of renunciation (torso without a head who needs nothing). Ketu is the ascetic that wants to go beyond the mundane life and achieve the final liberation.

Friendly Planets: Ketu is a friend of Jupiter (Brihaspati), Saturn (Shani) ; neutral with Venus (Shukra) and acrimonious with Mercury (Budha), Moon (Chandra), and Mars (Mangala).

Nakshatras (Ashwini, Magha, Mula) are ruled by Ketu in Vedic Astrology.

== See also ==
- Raja yoga (Hindu astrology) – Type of yogas
- Hati Hróðvitnisson
- Sköll
