= Navagraha =

Nine heavenly bodies in Indian astrology

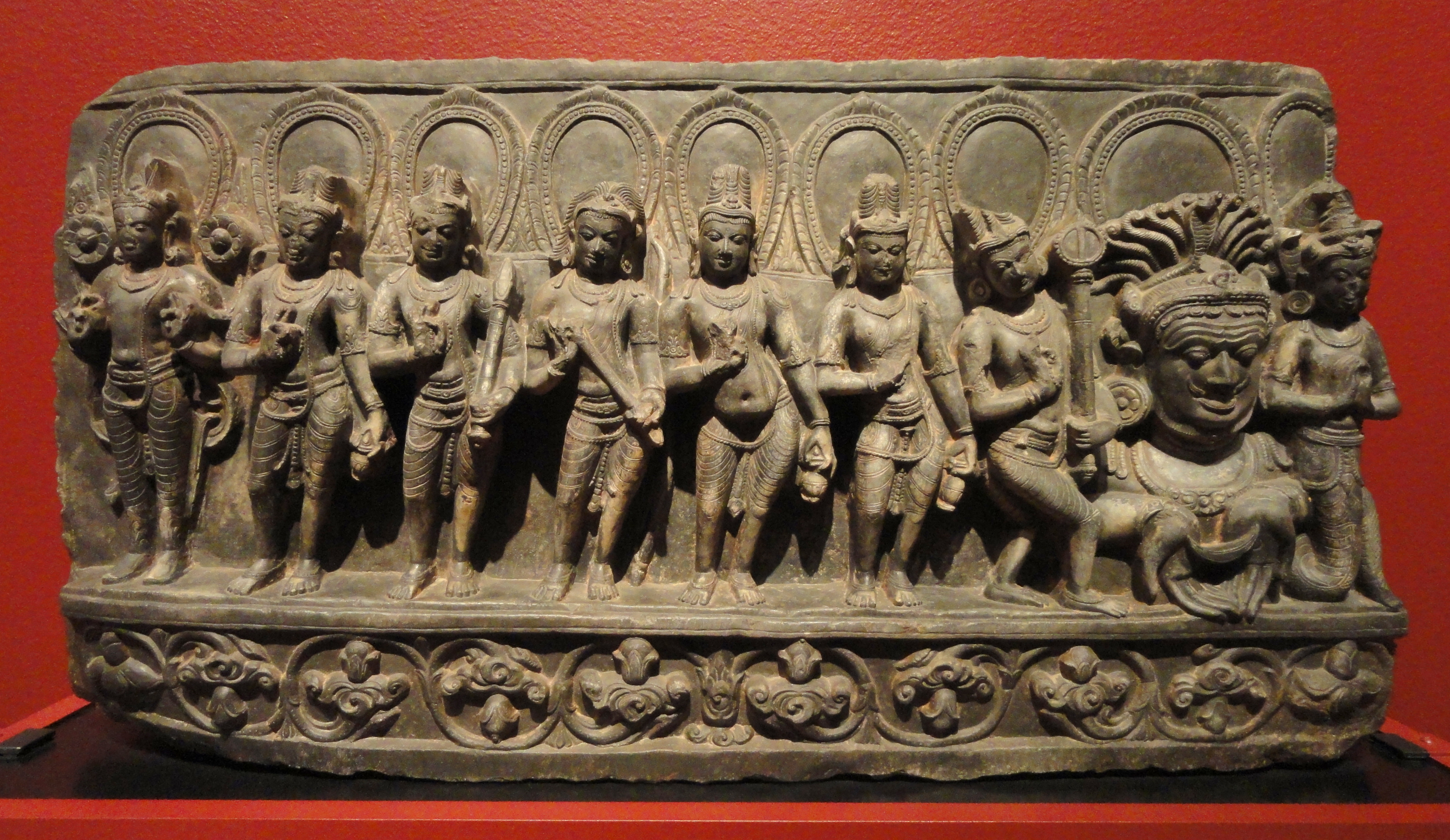
Schist sculpture of Navagraha (anthropomorphic forms of astronomical bodies), from Bihar, India, 10th century AD

The navagraha (Sanskrit: नवग्रह, Nine planets) are nine heavenly bodies and deities that influence human life on Earth according to Hinduism and Hindu mythology. The term is derived from nava (Sanskrit: नव "nine") and graha (Sanskrit: ग्रह "planet, seizing, laying hold of, holding"). The nine members of the navagraha are the Sun, Moon, planets Mercury, Venus, Mars, Jupiter, and Saturn, and the two nodes of the Moon Rahu, Ketu.

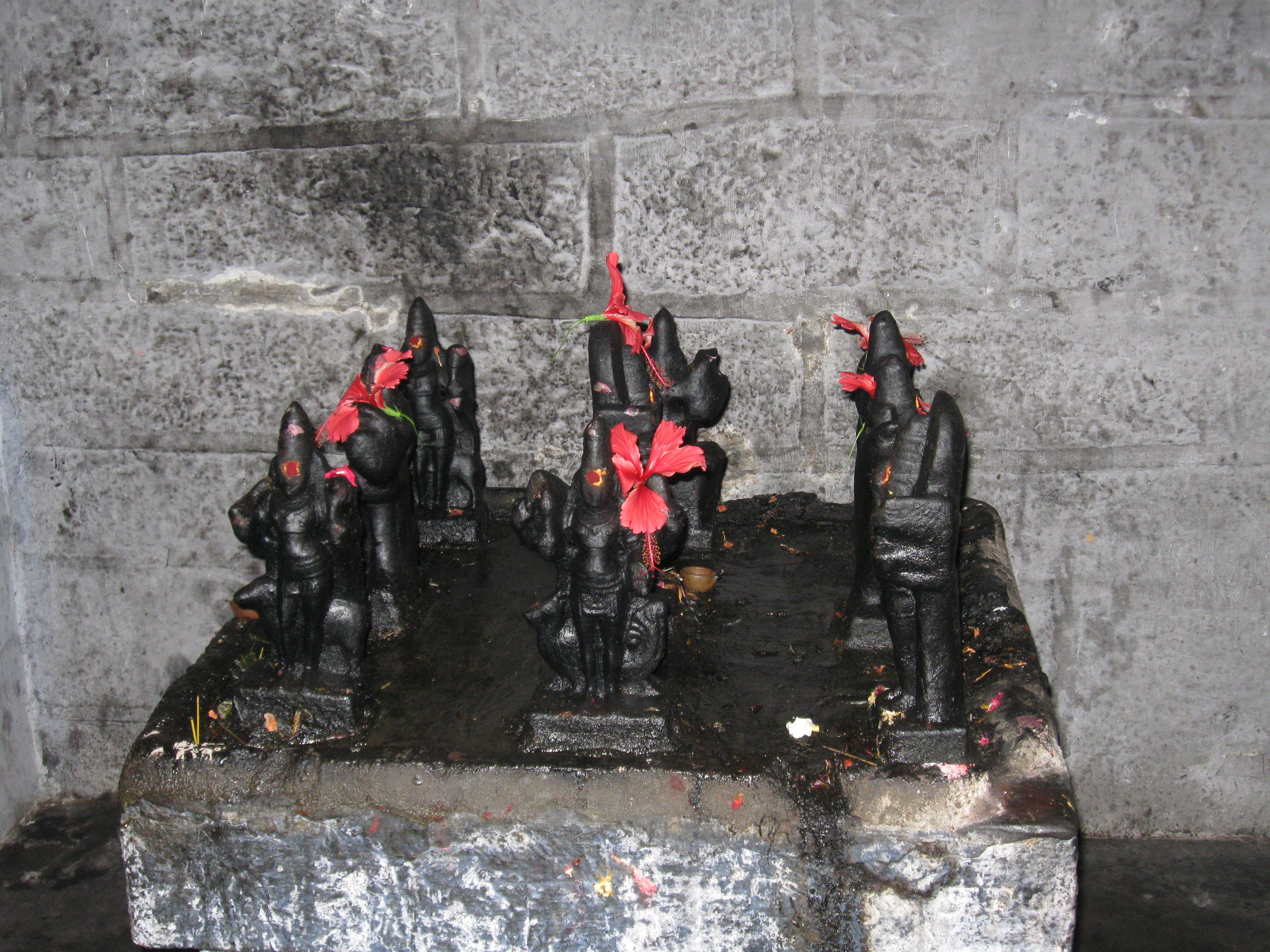
A typical navagraha shrine found inside a Hindu temple

The term planet was applied originally only to the five planets known (i.e., visible to the naked eye) and excluded the Earth. The term was later generalized, particularly during the Middle Ages, to include the Sun and the Moon (sometimes referred to as "lights"), making a total of seven planets. The seven days of the week in the Hindu calendar correspond with the seven classical planets, and European culture also follows the same system, and the days are named accordingly in most languages of the Indian subcontinent. Most Hindu temples around the world have a designated place dedicated to the worship of the navagraha.

== Origins and historical development ==
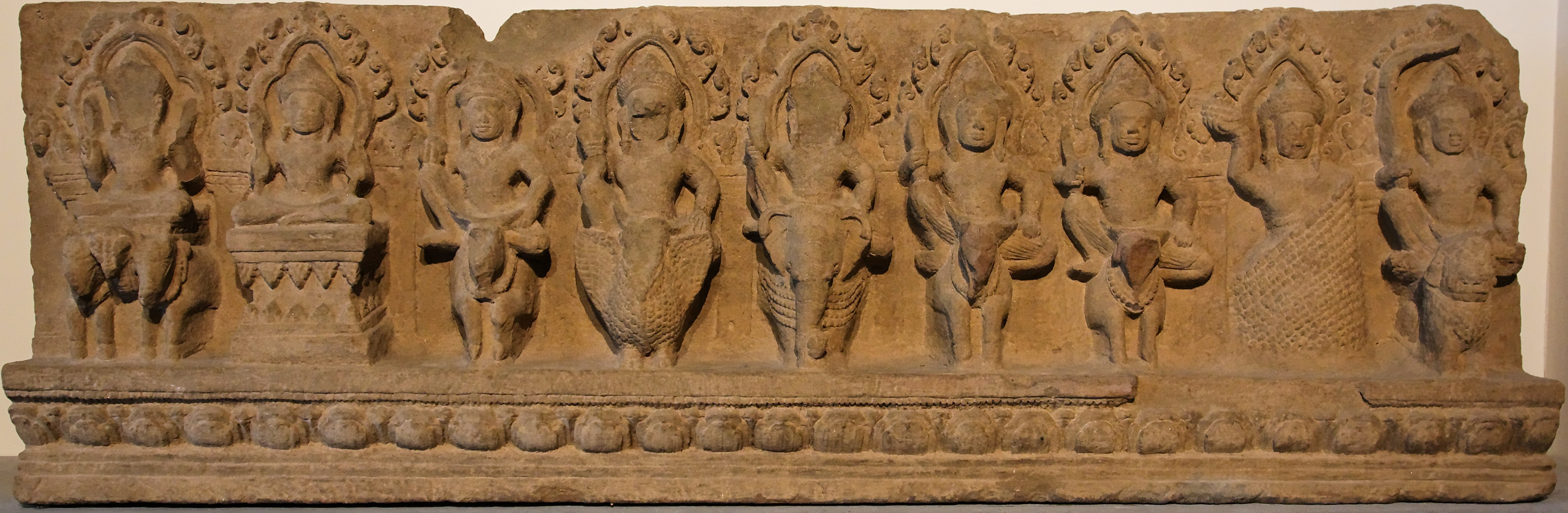
The Nine Devas, Khleang style of Angkor.

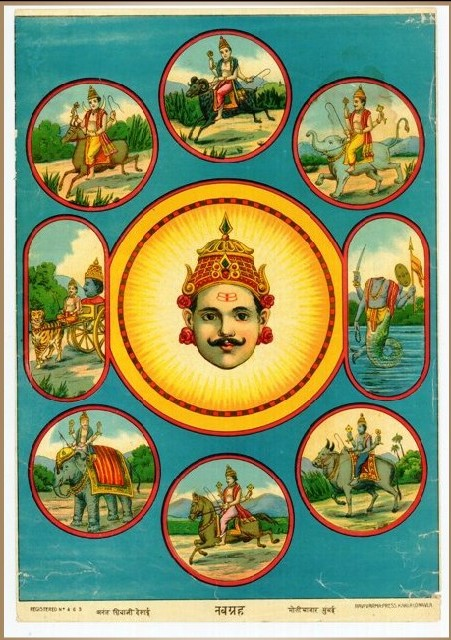
Navagraha, Sun at the center surrounded by the planets, Painting by Raja Ravi Varma

The conceptual foundations of the Navagraha lie in the earliest stratum of Vedic literature. The Rigveda and the Atharvaveda mention the Sun, Moon, and several stars as cosmic agents having influence on earth, though no systematized group of nine planetary deities is yet attested in these texts. The Atharvaveda contains references to eclipse-causing "demons", and the Chandogya Upanishad names Rahu as a shadow entity responsible for eclipses and meteors, representing one of the earliest textual acknowledgements of what would later become the chaya graha (shadow planet) concept.

The specific term "graha" in its astrological sense was not applied to the shadow entities until the later Mahabharata and Ramayana. By the early centuries CE, contact with Hellenistic culture and earlier Babylonian astronomy led to a significant transformation of Indian planetary thought. Conceptions of the five visible planets entered Indian cosmological literature through this cross-cultural exchange. After the third century CE, Indian calendars adopted the seven-day week structured around the seven classical planets, a notion that had originated in Babylonia and diffused through the Hellenistic world. The Yavanajataka of 120 - 150 CE often credited with standardising horoscopic astrology in India through the synthesis of these Greco-Babylonian elements with Indegnous nakshatra-based timekeeping. The Navagraha was further shaped by Zoroastrian and other West Asian contributions during the Kushana and Gupta periods, reflecting the broader Indo-Iranian exchange documented in the astronomical record of the period.

Rahu and Ketu were integrated as full members of the canonical nine only gradually; by the 8th to 9th century CE, they were firmly established as "chaya grahas", completing the Navagraha as it is recognised today.

=== Iconography ===
Each of the nine grahas is anthropomorphised with a distinctive iconographic programme that developed during the early medieval period i.e 5th - 12th century CE. The standard scholarly treatment of this material identifies clear Hellenistic influence in the depictions of planetary deities holding attributes parallel to those of Greco-Roman gods, with these forms being thoroughly indigenised into distinctly Indian iconography by the medieval period.

Each graha is associated with a particular colour, vahana, number of arms, weapon, and directional orientation. Surya is typically depicted standing or seated on a chariot drawn by seven horses; he holds lotus blossoms and wears northern-style boots and armour, a stylistic feature linking him to early Kushana era solar iconographic. Chandra rides a chariot pulled by an antelope or is depicted on a hare, and carries a lotus. Mangala rides a ram and is shown with a red complexion, carrying a trident and mace. Shani is depicted in dark blue or black, and Rahu and Ketu, being "chaya grahas" without physical bodies, are conventionally depicted as serpentine or headless forms: Rahu as a severed head riding a chariot or lion, and Ketu as a headless torso with a serpent's tail.

In South Indian Shaiva temples, particularly those of Tamil Nadu, the nine figures are typically aligned in a single row facing the main sanctum, with no two grahas facing each other. In North Indian temples, Navagraha panels are more commonly carved on door lintels ("dvarasakha"), functioning as protective cosmic guardians of the threshold.

=== Role in Jyotisha (Hindu astrology) ===
The Navagraha constitute the foundational planetary framework of Jyotisha, one of the six Vedanga. In Jyotisha, each graha rules specific rashis (zodiac signs), governs particular domains of human life, and presides over defined periods through the system of dashas i.e. planetary periods.

The Navagraha are divided into natural benefics i.e. shubha grahas particularly Jupiter, Venus, Mercury, and the waxing Moon and natural malefics i.e. Krura grahas mainly Mars, Saturn, and the shadow planets Rahu and Ketu, as well as the Sun under certain conditions. A negative planetary impact is termed a 'dosha' ; Saturn and the shadow planets are considered the most consistently challenging.

=== Ritual worship and remedial practices ===
Navagraha worship takes place at both the personal domestic level and within Hindu temple precincts. Most Hindu temples maintain a designated "Navagraha mandapa", in which the nine deities are installed in a prescribed spatial arrangement, with Surya at the centre and the other eight in the eight cardinal and inter-cardinal directions, with no two facing each other. It is believed by the worshipers that circumambulation the navagraha alter clockwise helps to increase the positive influence and decrease the negative influence of the Navagraha deities on their lives.

A remedial ritual, called Grahshanti(planetary pacification), is performed to alleviate the adverse effects attributed to the Navagrahas. The ceremony involves preparing a vedi(ritual altar) and kalasha, invoking the nine grahas and associated deities, reciting their prescribed mantras and making offerings through homa(fire ritual). The ceremony is conducted by a Purohit(priest) on behalf of a Karta, the person for whom the ritual is performed. Offerings of ghee, grains, sesame and specified woods are made to the individual grahas.

=== Temples ===
Navagraha temples of Tamil Nadu. The most celebrated circuit comprises nine Shaiva shrines within roughly 100 km of Kumbakonam, Thanjavur district, each dedicated primarily to one graha; the exception is Surya Kovil, which centres on Surya himself. The present masonry structures of this circuit date to the medieval Chola period.

Beyond Hinduism, the Navagraha's influence extends to Jainism and Buddhism, including integration into Vajrayana ritual practice in the Newar valley of Nepal.

=== Mythological narratives underlying the relationships ===
Surya and Shani - The narrative is preserved in several Puranas including the Markandeya Purana, the Vaana Purana, and the Vishnu Purana.

Brihaspati and Shukra - Recounted in the Devi-Bhagawat Purana and the Mahabharat (Shanti Parva).

== List ==
Navagrahas:
No.	Image	Name	Western equivalent	Day	Ratna	Stotra
1.		Surya	Sun	Sunday	Ruby	japākusuma saṅkāśaṃ kāśyapēyaṃ mahādyutim । tamō'riṃ sarva pāpaghnaṃ praṇatōsmi divākaram ॥1॥
2.		Chandra	Moon	Monday	Pearl	dadhiśaṅkha tuṣārābhaṃ kṣīrōdārṇava sambhavam । namāmi śaśinaṃ sōmaṃ śambhō-rmakuṭa bhūṣaṇam ॥2॥
3.		Mangala	Mars	Tuesday	Red coral	dharaṇī garbha sambhūtaṃ vidyutkānti samaprabham । kumāraṃ śaktihastaṃ taṃ maṅgaḻaṃ praṇamāmyaham ॥3॥
4.		Budha	Mercury	Wednesday	Emerald	priyaṅgu kalikāśyāmaṃ rūpēṇā pratimaṃ budham । saumyaṃ saumya guṇōpētaṃ taṃ budhaṃ praṇamāmyaham ॥4॥
5.		Brihaspati/Guru	Jupiter	Thursday	Yellow sapphire	dēvānāṃ cha ṛṣīṇāṃ cha guruṃ kāñchanasannibham । buddhimantaṃ trilōkēśaṃ taṃ namāmi bṛhaspatim ॥5॥
6.		Shukra	Venus	Friday	Diamond	himakunda mṛṇāḻābhaṃ daityānaṃ paramaṃ gurum । sarvaśāstra pravaktāraṃ bhārgavaṃ praṇamāmyaham ॥6॥
7.		Shani	Saturn	Saturday	Blue sapphire	nīlāñjana samābhāsaṃ raviputraṃ yamāgrajam । chāyā mārtāṇḍa sambhūtaṃ taṃ namāmi śanaiścharam ॥7॥
8.		Rahu	Ascending node of the Moon/Uranus		Hessonite garnet	ardhakāyaṃ mahāvīraṃ chandrāditya vimardhanam । siṃhikā garbha sambhūtaṃ taṃ rāhuṃ praṇamāmyaham ॥8॥
9.		Ketu	Descending node of the Moon/Neptune		Cat's eye chrysoberyl	palāśa puṣpa saṅkāśaṃ tārakāgrahamastakam । raudraṃ raudrātmakaṃ ghōraṃ taṃ kētuṃ praṇamāmyaham ॥9॥

== Music ==
Muthuswami Dikshitar (1776–1835), a Carnatic music composer from southern India, composed the Navagraha Kritis in praise of the nine grahas. Each song is a prayer to one of the nine planets. The Sahitya (lyrics) of the songs reflect a profound knowledge of the mantra and jyotisha sastras.

== See also ==
- Jyotisha
- Nakshatra
- Saptarshi
- List of Hindu deities
- List of Hindu pilgrimage sites
- List of Navagraha temples
- List of Natchathara temples
- List of Hindu temples
- Planets in astrology
- Nine planets
