= Anjani (disambiguation) =

Anjani, born Anjani Thomas, is an American singer-songwriter.

Anjani may also refer to:

== Hinduism ==
- Añjanā, (Anjani in Malay), the mother of Hanuman, one of the heroes of the Indian epic, the Ramayana

== People ==
- Anjani Bai Malpekar (1883–1974), Indian classical singer
- Anjani Kumar Sharma (born 1933), Nepal's first general surgeon
- Anjani Thomas (born 1959), American singer-songwriter

== Places ==
- Anjani, Mainpuri, a village in Uttar Pradesh, India
- Anjani Khurd, a village in Lonar taluka, Buldhana district, Maharashtra, India

== See also ==
- Anjana (disambiguation)
- Anjan (disambiguation)
- Anjaan (disambiguation)
- Anjaana Anjaani, 2010 Indian romantic comedy film by Siddharth Anand
- Antani, a surname
