= Antai =

Antai may refer to:

- Antai Subdistrict, Fuzhou, Fujian, China
- Antai Subdistrict, Qing'an County, Heilongjiang, China
- Antai Village, Marakei, Kiribati
- Antai-ji or Antai Temple, Buddhist temple in Shin'onsen, Mikata District, Hyōgo, Japan
- Antai College of Economics and Management, business school of Shanghai Jiao Tong University, China

== See also ==
- Antani
