= Tarakamaya War =

Hindu mythological conflict

- Part of Devasura Sangrama
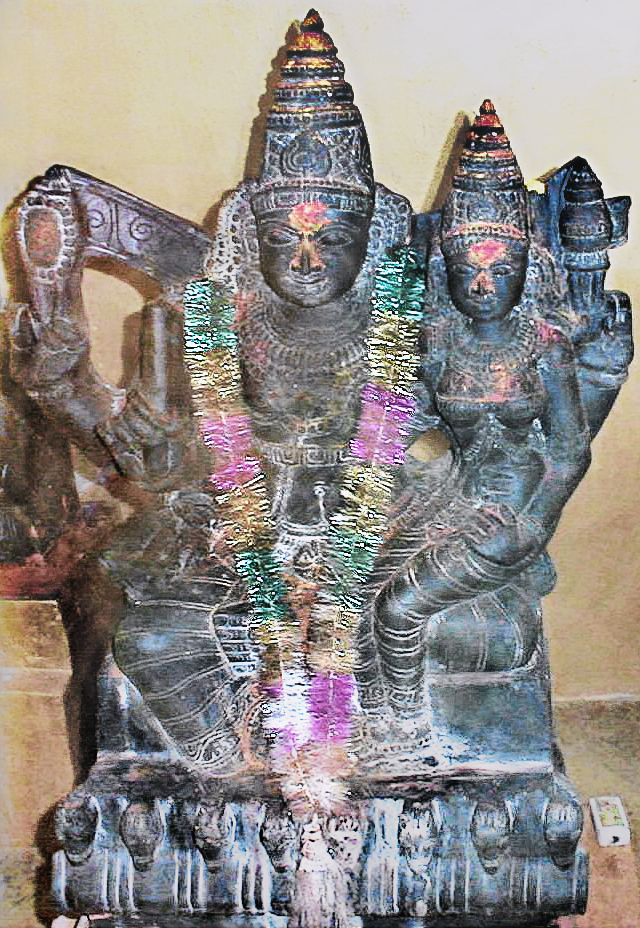
- Brihaspati with Tara, whose abduction instigated the war. From Navagraha temple at Surendrapuri
Date	Krita Yuga
Location	Bhuloka
Result	Military stalemate Death of Virochana; Death of Kalanemi; Intervention by Brahma; Triumph of Brihaspati; Return of Tara to Brihaspati; Birth of Budha; Curse of Budha New rule of fatherhood

Belligerents
Brihaspati; Indra; Devas; Rudra; Vishnu Yakshas	Soma; Shukra; Virochana; Daityas; Danavas Kalanemi

Commanders and leaders
Rudra	Soma

The Tarakamaya War (Sanskrit: तारकामय युद्ध) transl. 'war over the love of Tara' is described to be an ancient conflict in Hindu mythology, instigated by the elopement of Tara, the consort of Brihaspati, by Soma, the god of the moon. It is mentioned in the Padma Purana, and described to be the fifth war in the series of Devasura Sangrama, the battles between the devas and the asuras.

== Legend ==
According to one legend, this abduction had occurred to punish Brihaspati for his extramarital affair with Mamata, the pregnant wife of Utathya. Another legend states that the abduction occurred due to Soma's arrogance, due to the success of his rajasuya ceremony.^{[5]} Soma refused to return Tara to her husband, despite an intervention by Indra. Brihaspati, the preceptor, was aided by Indra and the devas, allied with the yakshas, while Soma was assisted by Shukra and the daityas, allied with the danavas. Led by Rudra,^{[6]} the devas assaulted the asuras with divine missiles, and the asuras returned this assault with a barrage of their own. The Brahmanda Purana states that Vishnu participated in the war as well, slaying the asura Kalanemi.^{[7]} Indra is stated to have slain Virochana, the son of Prahlada, who had sided with Soma.^{[8]} Eventually, Brahma intervened and restored Tara to her husband. In due course, she gave birth to Budha, who both Brihaspati and Soma claimed as theirs until Tara affirmed that the latter was the father.^{[9]}
