= Kesari (Ramayana) =

Father of Hindu god Hanuman

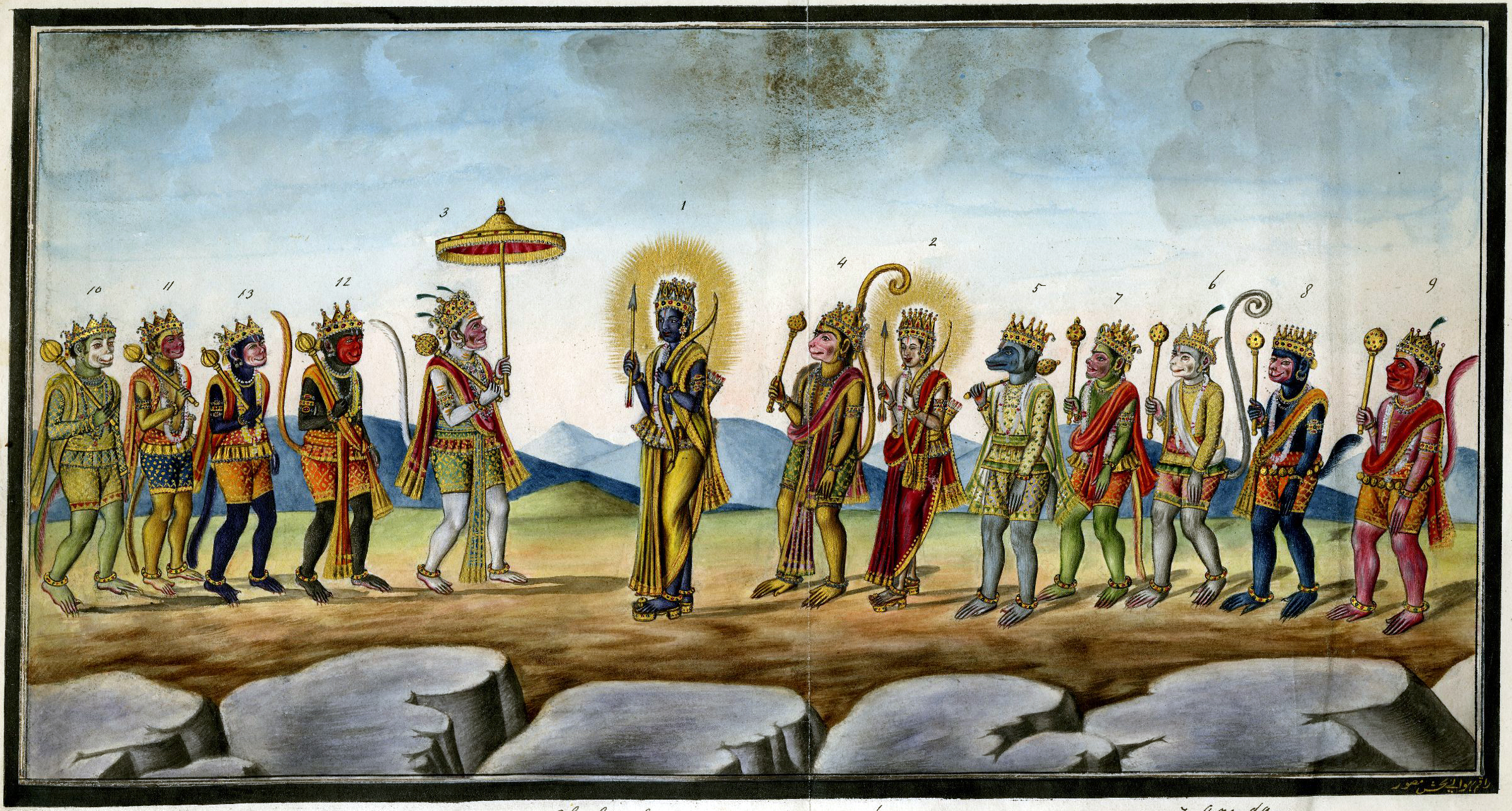
- Kesari and other Vanara chiefs meeting Rama
- Affiliation: Vanara
- Abode: Kishkindha
- Texts: Ramayana

Genealogy
- Parents: Brihaspati; Tara
- Siblings: Bharadvaja, Kacha
- Spouse: Anjana and Anjali
- Children: Hanuman: Matiman, Shrutiman, Ketuman, Gatiman, Dhritiman or Dyutiman by Anjali

Kesari is a male vanara, and a figure in Hinduism. He is the father of Hanuman and the husband of Anjana.

== Legend ==
=== Early life ===
While mighty Kesari ruled the Mount Meru/Sumeru, Brahmā cursed an apsara named Managarva, and turned her into a vanara. She married Kesari, under the name Anjana. For a long time, the couple were childless. Anjana propitiated Vayu for a child.

In Shaiva tradition, Shiva was requested to beget a son to help Vishnu, who was about to incarnate as Rama to slay Ravana. Shiva and Parvati took the form of vanaras and engaged in intercourse. When Vayu appeared, the couple made their presence known, and Parvati revealed the child inside her. Parvati refused to take the foetus in the form of a vanara to Kailasha. As Shiva had instructed, Parvati offered the child to Vayu, who transferred it to Anjana's womb, who gave birth to Hanuman.

=== Later life ===
Kesari, Anjana and child Hanuman moved to Kishkindha on the request of its king Riksharaja, father of Vali and Sugriva. Kesari became his Chief Commander alongside ruling the Mount Meru. He was a respected personality and was honoured by all Vanaras and was a friend of Brahma’s son Jamvanta, the king of bears.

Later in his life, he fought alongside the Vanara Army of Lord Rama against Lankesh Ravana to rescue Devi Sita and slew many powerful demons.

== In popular culture ==
Year	Name	Played by	Channel	Country
1997	Jai Hanuman	Deepak Jethi	DD Metro	India
2015	Sankatmochan Mahabali Hanuman	Gagan Kang	Sony Entertainment Television	India
2024	Shrimad Ramayan	Jameel Chaudhary	Sony Entertainment Television	India
