= Anjana =

Anjana may refer to:

- Añjanā, the mother of Hanuman in the Indian epic, the Ramayana
- Anjana (Cantabrian mythology), a witch in Cantabrian mythology
- Anjana, Ayodhya, a village in Ayodhya district, Uttar Pradesh, India
- Anjana Jat, a Jat people sub-caste
- Kohl, Ayurvedic collyrium

== Names ==
- Anjana (actress), Kannada cinema actress
- Anjana Bhowmick (1944-2024), Bengali actress
- Anjana Jayaprakash, Tamil/Malayalam actress
- Anjana Khatwa (born 1975), British earth scientist
- Anjana Menon (born 1988), Malayalam actress
- Anjana Mumtaz (born 1941), Hindi actress
- Anjana Rangan (born 1989), Tamil television host
- Anjana Singh (born 1990), Bhojpuri actress
- Anjana Sukhani (born 1978), Hindi actress
- Anjana Sultana (1965-2025), Bangladeshi actress
- Anjana Vasan (born 1987), Singaporean actress

== Film and entertainments ==
- Anjana (album), 1992 bihu album by Pankaj Udhas

== See also ==
- Anjani (disambiguation)
- Anjan (disambiguation)
