= Ajan =

Ajan may refer to:

== People ==
- Ajan (surname)
- Ajan Fakir, a Sufi saint and poet who came from Baghdad and settled in the Sibsagar area of Assam
- Midhat Ajanović, who often used Ajan as a pen name

== Geography ==
- Ajan Coast
- Ajan, Markazi, a village in Iran
- Ajan, Mazandaran, a village in Iran
- Ajan, Tehran, a village in Iran
- Ajan, local name of Agliano Terme, Asti, Italy

== Other uses ==
- Ajan Faquir Saheb, an Assamese language film produced by Bani Kalita and directed by Asif Iqbal Hussain
- African Jesuit AIDS Network, a network of organizations that fight against HIV/AIDS created by Jesuits on 2002

== See also ==
- Ajahn, a Thai term of address
- Jan (disambiguation)
- Anjan (disambiguation)
