= Kacha (sage) =

Sage in Hinduism

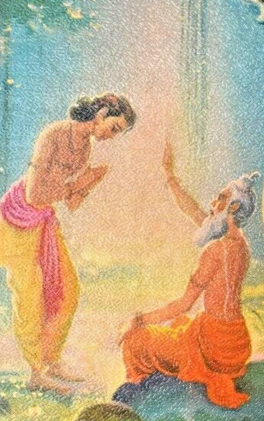
- 20th-century lithograph depicting Kacha receiving boon from Shukra
- Affiliation: Rishi, Devas
- Texts: Mahabharata, Matsya Purana, Agni Purana

Genealogy
- Parents: Brihaspati (father); Tara (mother)
- Siblings: Bharadvaja, Kesari

Kacha (Sanskrit: कच, romanized: Kaca) is a sage featured in Hindu mythology. He is the son of Brihaspati and Tara. The narrative of Kacha is mentioned in the Mahābhārata, the Matsya Purana and the Agni Purana. He is known for learning Mṛtasañjīvanī vidyā mantra (a hymn for reviving the dead) from his guru Shukra. However, he is unable to revive devas due to the curse of Shukra's daughter, Devayani.

== Legend ==
Kacha is described to be the handsome son of Brihaspati. He is sent by the devas to Shukra's ashrama (spiritual hermitage) to learn about the Mṛtasañjīvanī vidyā mantra, the knowledge that allows one to restore life after death. Shukra accepts him as his disciple, and the latter accepts the task of offering him a thousand years of service. Devayani is infatuated by the youth, and the two become an inseparable couple. The asuras, however, are suspicious of Kacha's intentions, guessing correctly that he wished to know the secret of the life-restoring mantra. They murder him on two different occasions: They kill him when he is deep within the forest and feed him to the wolves, and pound his body to paste, mixing it with seawater. On both occasions, upon the insistent pleas of his daughter, Kacha is restored to life with the knowledge of the Sañjīvanī by Shukra. In their third attempt, the asuras burn the body of Kacha, mix it with ashes and wine, offer it to Shukra to drink. When dusk falls, and Shukra observes that his disciple has not yet arrived, he deduces that the latter is in his belly. Finding himself in a dilemma, the acharya teaches Kacha the Mṛtasañjīvanī mantra, and when the disciple bursts out of Shukra's belly, killing him, he revives his acharya by chanting the mantra. His objective achieved, he stays under the tutelage of Shukra until his education is completed.

His education complete, Kacha takes his leave from Devayani and her father, and starts to journey back to Devaloka. Devayani follows him for a long distance, and requests that he marry her. Kacha reveals to her that Shukra had told him that since he had emerged from the acharya's belly, he is deemed to be his son, and that made Devayani his sister. Furious at his rejection, Devayani curses him that he would be unable to employ the art of the life-reviving mantra himself. Kacha, in turn, curses her that none of the sons of sages would marry her. After the incident, they parted ways, and never met again.
