= Anjan =

Anjan may refer to:

== People ==
- Anjan (given name), including a list of people with the name
- Atul Kumar Anjan, Indian politician
- Zahidur Rahman Anjan (1963 or 1964–2025), Bangladeshi film director

== Other uses ==
- Anjan-class tugboat, Indian Navy service watercraft
- Anjan, a village in Gumla district, Jharkhand state, India
- Anjan, a fictional character played by Dipankar De in the Indian films Agantuk (1991) and Agantuker Pore (2016)

== See also ==
- Anjaan (disambiguation)
- Anjana (disambiguation)
- Anjani (disambiguation)
- Ajan (disambiguation)
- Anjar (disambiguation)
