= Anjar =

Anjar may refer to:

- Anjar, Gujarat, a town and municipality in Gujarat, India
- Anjar, Iran, a village in East Azerbaijan Province, Iran
- Anjar, Lebanon, a town in the Bekaa valley of Lebanon

== See also ==
- Anjan (disambiguation)
