= Anjani Kumar Sharma =

Nepalese first Surgeon (1953 – 2018)

- अञ्जनी कुमार शर्मा
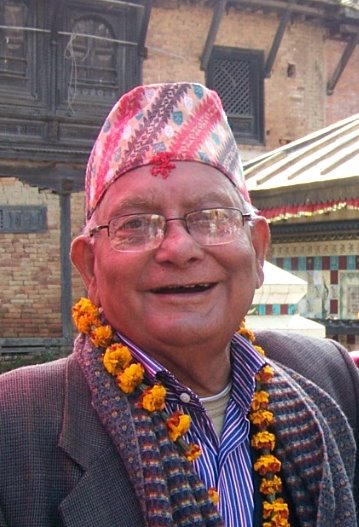
- Born: 8 June 1933; Siraha, Nepal
- Died: 7 October 2014 (aged 86); Kathmandu, Nepal
- Education: FRCS in Oncology
- Alma mater: Calcutta Medical College, India
- Occupation: General surgeon / Oncologist
- Spouse: Annapurna Sharma
- Children: Two sons and a daughters

Anjani Kumar Sharma (Nepali: अञ्जनी कुमार शर्मा) was Nepal's first surgeon. Sharma was born on June 7, 1928, in the remote region of Bhaluwahi in Siraha District in the Terai region of Nepal. Growing up in rural Nepal, there was poor access to healthcare, and because of this, he lost his mother at age 8. Following her death, he was inspired to become a doctor. With the help of his father and uncle, he achieved his dreams. He completed his MBBS at Calcutta Medical College in 1955. He was awarded an MS in Surgery from Darbhanga Medical College in India. He also went on to complete his FRCS in the UK. He is credited with establishing the Surgery Department at Bir Hospital, Nepal's oldest hospital.

Sharma also established Bhaktapur Cancer Hospital. He has also chaired the Nepal Medical Association (NMA). He was one of the five founding members of the Nepal Medical College in Jorpati. He established the "Anjani Kumar Sharma Gold Medal" in 2009, which is awarded to the student securing the highest marks in Surgery in the final MBBS exams.

He died on October 7, 2014, in Kathmandu, suffering from transitional cell carcinoma.
