= Tara (Hindu goddess) =

Hindu goddess

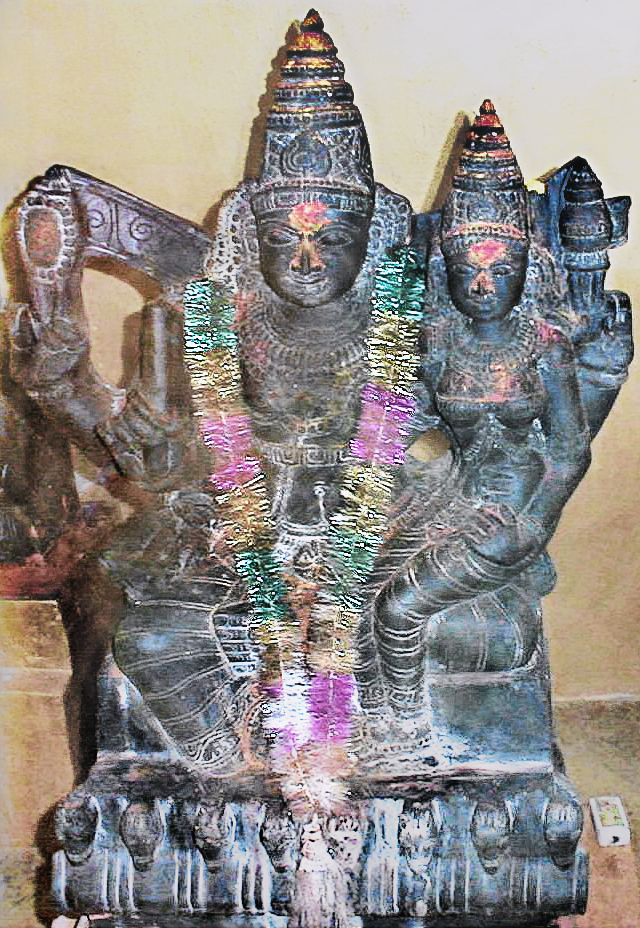
- Brihaspati with Tara, from Navagraha temple at Surendrapuri
- Other names: Taraka, Chandramasi
- Affiliation: Devi

Genealogy
- Consort: Brihaspati
- Children: Budha (from Soma); 6 sons including Shamyu and Kacha and a daughter (from Brihaspati)

Tara (Sanskrit: तारा, romanized: Tārā, lit. 'star'), also known as Taraka (Sanskrit: तारका, romanized: Tārakā, lit. 'star'), and Chandramasi (Sanskrit: चन्द्रमसी, romanized: Candramasī, lit. 'lunar') is a Hindu goddess and the consort of Brihaspati, the priest of the gods. She is the central figure in the Tarakamaya episode narrated in Hindu texts. While married to Brihaspati, she is abducted by Soma (also called Chandra), the moon god; some scriptures also describe Tara’s own attraction to Soma. A war breaks out between Brihaspati and Soma over her. Tara, already pregnant, is ultimately returned to her husband and later gives birth to Budha. After another conflict arises over the paternity of Budha, Tara reveals the child's father being Soma. Eventually forgiven, with Brihaspati she is the mother of six sons, regarded as personifications of fires, and one daughter. She is also the mother of the sage Kacha through Brihaspati

== Story ==
According to the Devi Bhagvata Purana and Padma Purana, Tara was the wife of Brihaspati, the guru of Devas. As her husband spent most of his time with the problems and matters of Devas, she felt ignored by her husband. One day, Chandra, the moon god visited Brihaspati. There he saw Tara and was captivated by her beauty. Tara also fell for Chandra due to his beautiful form, and the two ran away.

Brihaspati, lovesick and infuriated, demanded Chandra to return his wife. Chandra told Brihaspati that Tara was happy and satisfied with him. He enquired as to how an old man could be the husband of a young woman. This made Brihaspati more annoyed and he warned Chandra for battle. Indra and other Devas gathered to fight a war. Chandra was not ready to give Tara back and he took help from the Asuras and their preceptor, Shukra. The Devas were assisted by Shiva and his companions. Devas and Asura were about to fight a war, but Brahma, the creator god, stopped them and convinced Chandra to return Tara, who came back pregnant.

A legal proceeding went down. Bhrihaspati and Chandra both claimed that the child was theirs. Tara stood there shy, and refused to answer who the actual father of the child was no matter how much anyone tried to make her quit her silence. Exasperated, even the child in her belly finally asked 'of whose seed was I born, mother?' This made Tara answer that that the child was Chandra's. However, Brahma still decided that since Tara was legally Bhrihaspati's wife, the baby is also legally his. Bhrihaspati only wanted his wife, not his wife's affair child. So he cursed the child, Budha, to be born without gender. The child thus, after growing up, preferred the company of his biological father over his foster one, and his son Pururvas went on to establish the lunar dynasty named after his biological grandfather.The Padma Purana skips this entire legal battle, and instead after Tara confesses that the child is Chandra's, Chandra takes the baby and blesses him by placing him in the solar system. Here, Budha is genderless just because he can be, without further reasons provided on the why.

In the story, Tara is not punished, and in several retellings she is praised in erotic detail, despite being involved in a scandalous extra-marital affair.

In some other Puranic versions, Tara is abducted by Chandra and raped. The storyline following this is the same regarding the birth of Budha.

== Beyond the Indian subcontinent and Hinduism ==
She is known in Cambodia as Kirinei Devi (Khmer: កិរិណីទេវី), regarded as the consort of Lord Brihaspati in traditions influenced by Hindu culture transmitted through the Khmer Empire. She is considered the protective goddess of Thursday and is venerated during the Cambodian New Year festival, particularly when the first day of the lunar year falls on a Thursday according to the Cambodian calendar (Khmer: ពិធីផ្ទេរតំណែងទេវតាឆ្នាំថ្មី). She is thought to descend from heaven to care for the people of the land for one year, until the following New Year.

In Cambodian tradition, her depiction incorporates localized folk and cultural elements. She is commonly shown riding an elephant, with two arms holding an ankusha (goad) and a bow and arrow. She is often associated with the color green. Over time, her narrative and iconography have been adapted through a blend of Hindu influence and Cambodian Buddhist and folk traditions, giving her a distinct local identity.

== See also ==
- Nairatmya
- Tara (Devi)
- Tara (Buddhism)
