= Antai Subdistrict, Qing'an County =

Antai Subdistrict 安泰街道
- Subdistrict
- Location in Heilongjiang
- Coordinates: 46.8760°N 127.5119°E
- Country: People's Republic of China
- Province: Heilongjiang
- Prefecture-level city: Suihua
- County: Qing'an County
- Time zone: UTC+8 (China Standard)

Antai Subdistrict (Chinese: 安泰街道; pinyin: Āntài Jiēdào) is a subdistrict in Qing'an County, Suihua, Heilongjiang province, China. As of 2020, it administers the following three residential neighborhoods:

- Qingsheng Community (庆盛社区)
- Qingfeng Community (庆丰社区)
- Qinghe Community (庆和社区)

== See also ==
- List of township-level divisions of Heilongjiang
