= Antani =

Antani is a Sindhi surname common in India. It may refer to:

== Given name ==
- Antani Ivanov (born 1999), Bulgarian swimmer

== Surname ==
- M. D. Antani (born 1954), Indian police officer
- Niraj Antani (born 1991), American politician
- Vinesh Antani (born 1946), Indian writer

== See also ==
- Anjani (disambiguation)
- Antai (disambiguation)
