= Anjaan =

Anjaan (lit. 'stranger') may refer to:

- Anjaan (lyricist) (Lalji Pandey, 1929–1997), Indian Hindi lyricist
- Sameer Anjaan (Shitala Pandey, born 1958), Indian Hindi lyricist, son of Anjaan
- Anjaan (1941 film), a Bollywood film
- Anjaan (2014 film), an Indian Tamil film starring Suriya
  - Anjaan (soundtrack), soundtrack album of the film by Yuvan Shankar Raja

== See also ==
- Anjan (disambiguation)
- Anjaana, a 1969 Indian film
- Anjaana Anjaani, a 2010 Indian film by Siddharth Anand
- Anjaan Hai Koi, a 1969 Indian Hindi movie
- Anjaan: Special Crimes Unit, an Indian paranormal investigative crime horror TV series
- Anjaane, a 2005 Bollywood horror film
