= Antai College of Economics and Management =

Public business school in Shanghai, China

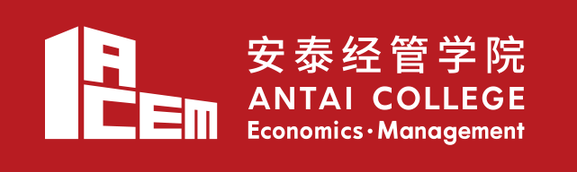
- Type: Public business school
- Established: 1918
- Parent institution: Shanghai Jiao Tong University
- Dean: Chen Fangruo
- Academic staff: 200
- Location: Shanghai, China
- Campus: Urban
- Website: acem.sjtu.edu.cn/en

The Antai College of Economics and Management (ACEM) is the business school of Shanghai Jiao Tong University, a public university in Shanghai, China. It was founded in 1918 as the School of Transportation Management and renamed the School of Management in 1931. The school offers both undergraduate and postgraduate programs, including a full-time MBA program, various executive education programs, and multiple PhD programs.

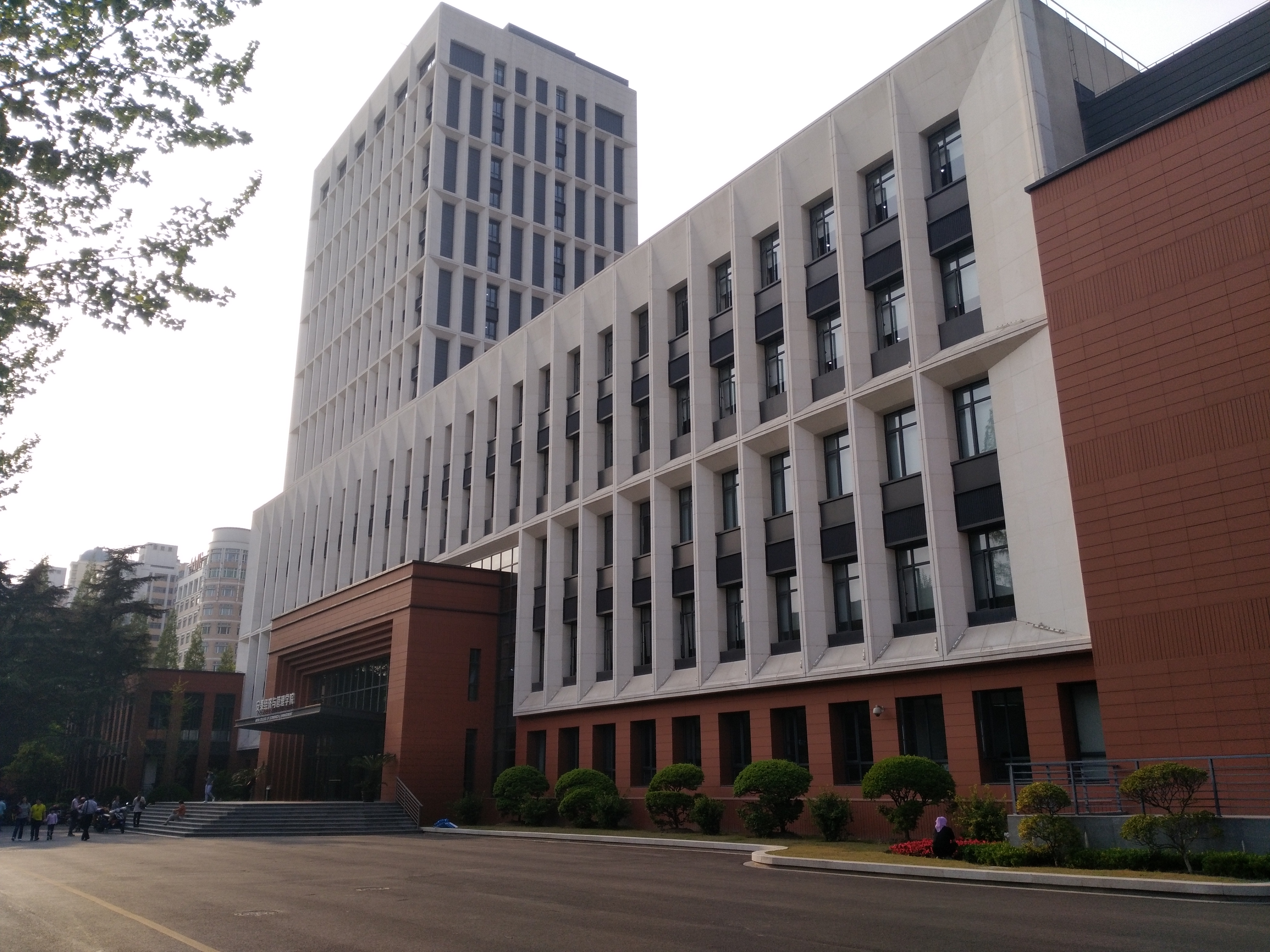
Antai College of Economics and Management

== Rankings ==
	Financial Times rankings				
	Business School	EMBA	MBA	MIM	Cust.Exec.
	(APAC)	(Global/APAC/China)			
2018	1	8/3/3	34/7/2	18/2/1	19/4/2
2017	1	6/3/3	34/7/3	32/5/1	8/3/1
2016	/	7/6/4	39/8/4	33/7/1	9/5/1
