= Añjanā =

Mother of Hanuman in Hinduism

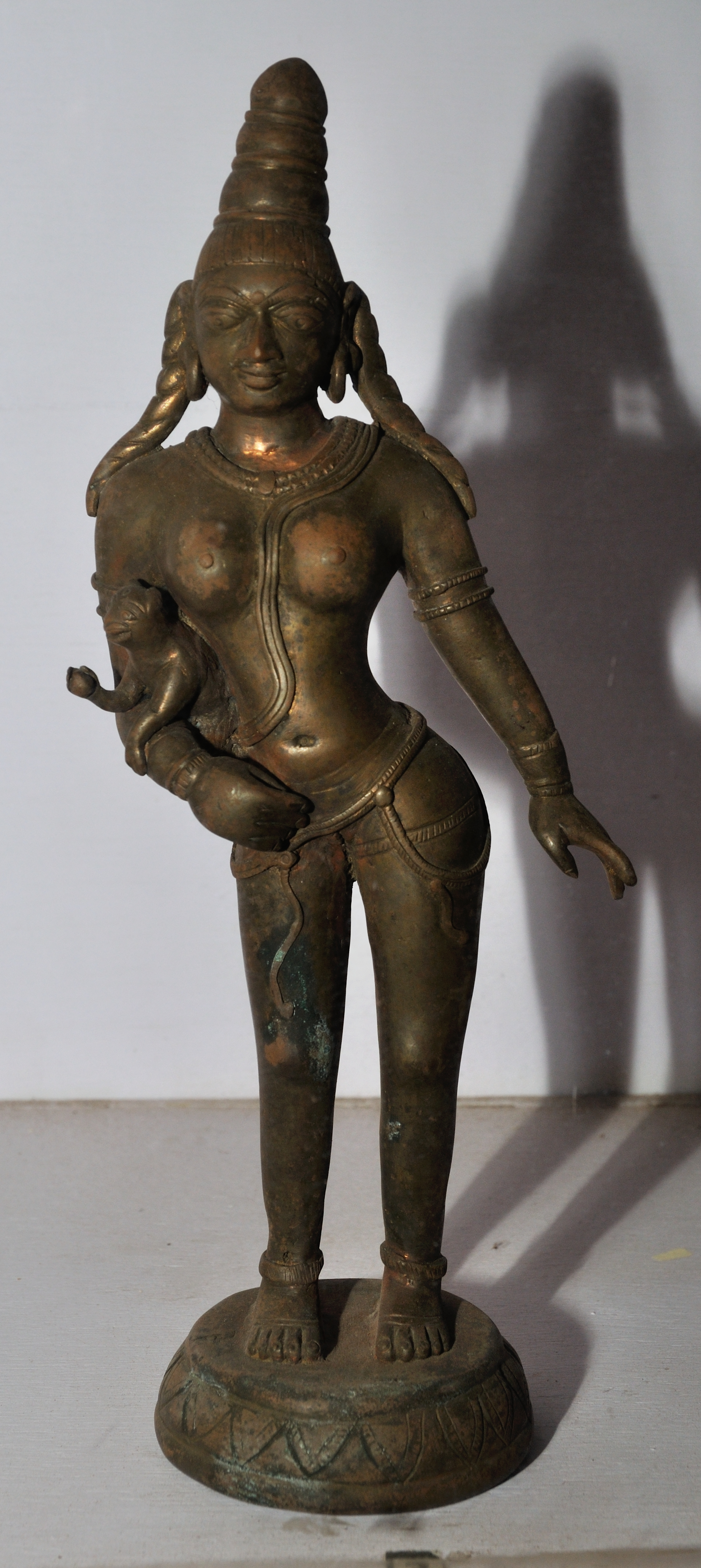
- Anjani with an infant Hanuman (Bronze – Pallava period)
- Affiliation: Apsara, Vanara
- Texts: Ramayana and its other versions

Genealogy
- Spouse: Kesari
- Children: Hanuman

Anjana (Sanskrit: अञ्जना, romanized: Añjanā), also known as Anjani and Anjali, is the mother of Hanuman, one of the protagonists of the Hindu epic the Ramayana. She is said to have been a resident of Kishkindha in the text.

== Legend ==
According to a version of the legend, Anjana was an apsara named Punjikastala, who was born on earth as a vanara princess due to the curse of Brihaspati. Anjana was married to Kesari, a mighty vanara, the son of Bṛhaspati and ruler of Mount Meru.

Anjana was the mother of Hanuman. Being Anjana's son, Hanuman is also called Anjaneya or Anjanayar. Anjana and Kesari performed an intense prayer to Vayu to beget him as their child. Pleased with their devotion, Vayu granted the boon they sought.

== Worship ==
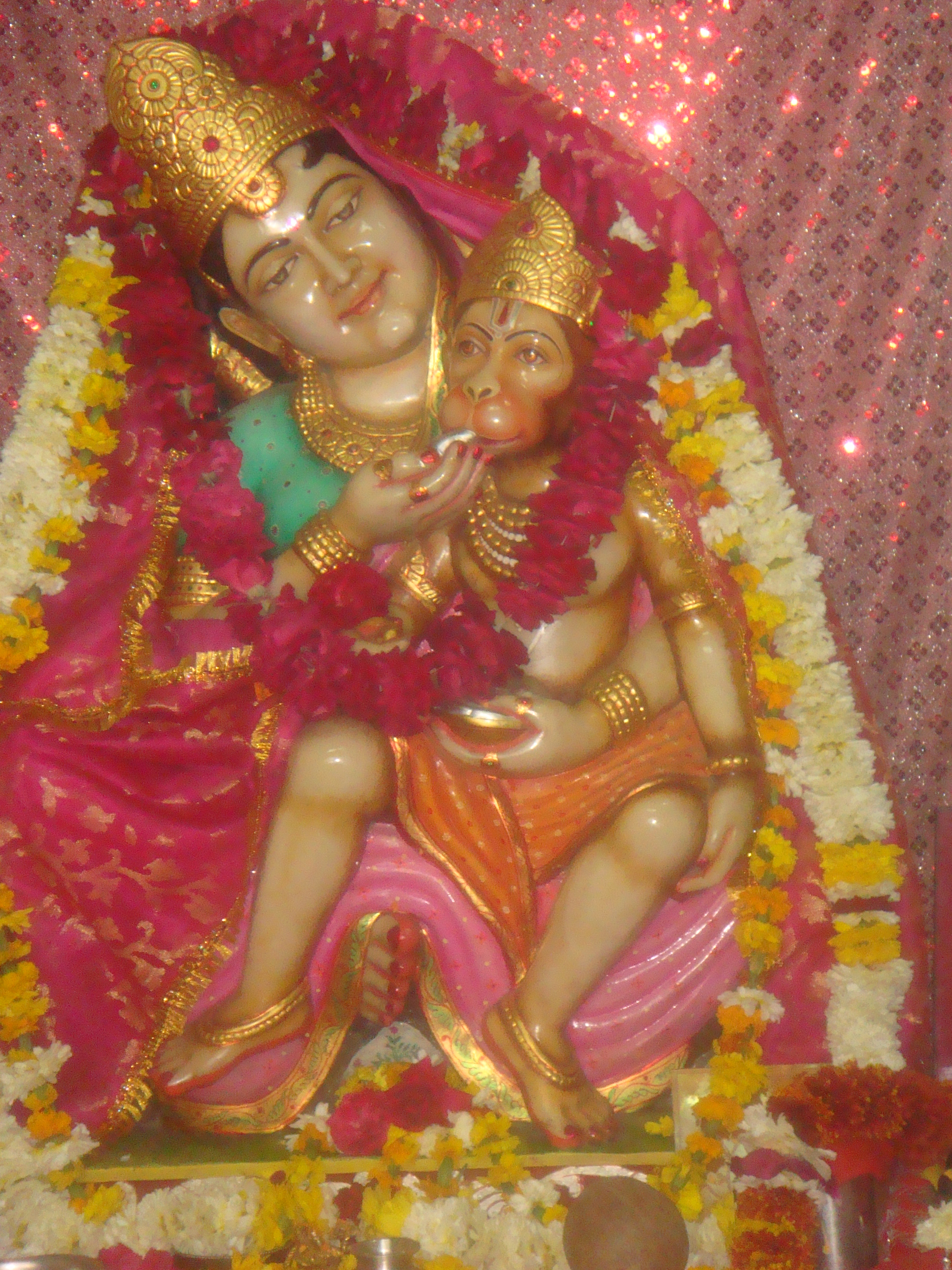
An idol of Anjani having son Hanuman in her lap in Anjani Hanuman Dham Temple, Chomu, Rajasthan

In Himachal Pradesh, the goddess Anjana is worshiped as a family deity. There is a temple dedicated to her at 'Masrer' near Dharamshala. It is believed that Sri Anjana once came and remained there for some time. One of the locals upon learning, revealed her real identity to the other villagers, going against her wishes. She soon left, but not before turning that villager into stone which remains outside her temple even to this day. Her vahana (vehicle) is a scorpion, hence believers worship Anjana after being bitten by a scorpion.

== Outside Indian subcontinent ==
=== Indonesia ===
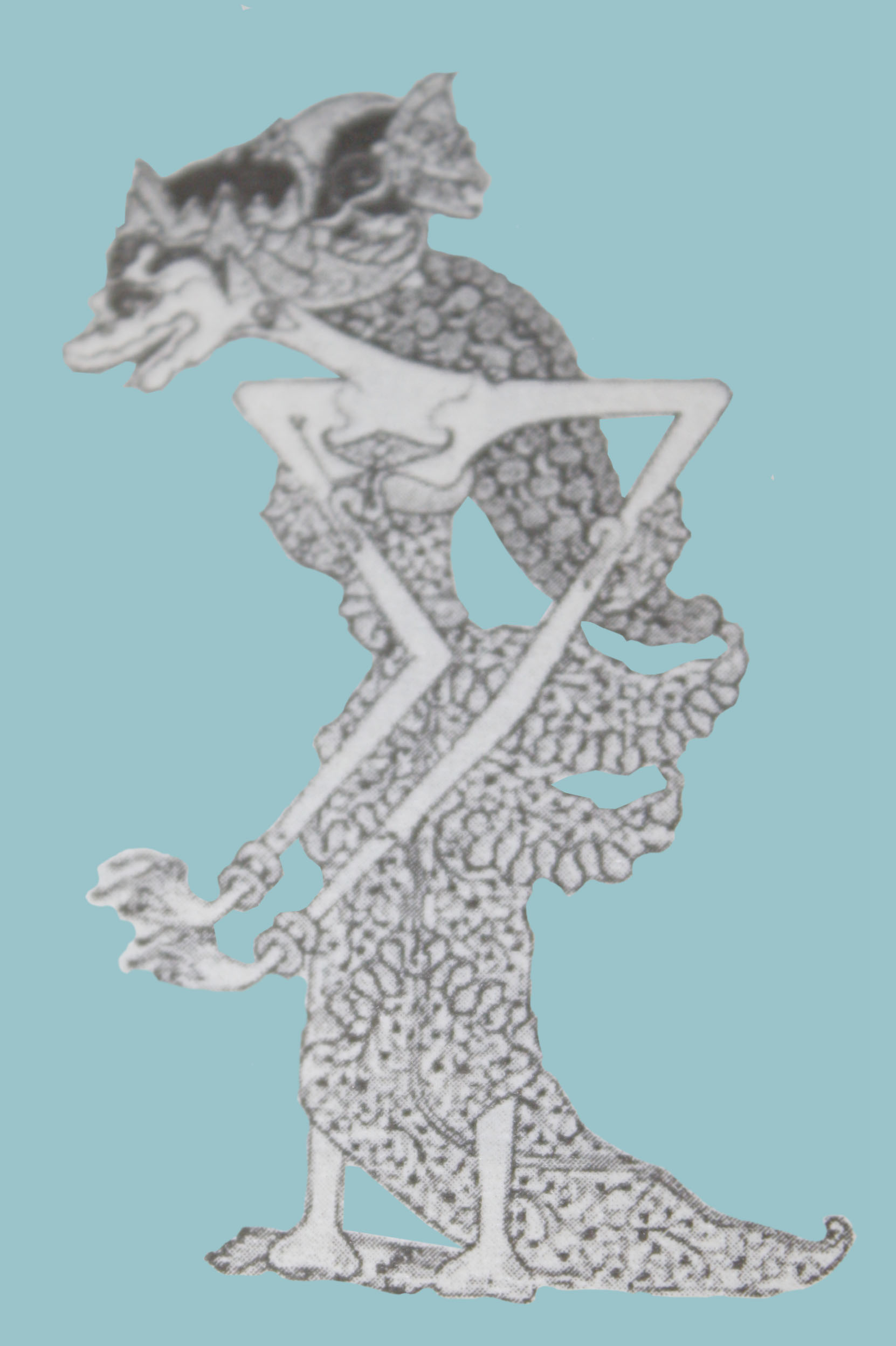
Anjana wayang (puppetry) in Indonesian culture

In Indonesia, Anjana (Indonesian: Anjani ) is a well-known figure in the world of wayang (Indonesian Puppetry) in Javanese culture. According to Javanese wayang, Dewi Anjani is the eldest child of Resi Gotama in Grastina with the goddess Indradi, an angel descended from Bahara Asmara. He has Cupu Manik Astagina which is a divine heirloom that was given by Batara Surya to Dewi Indradi, when opened in it can be seen all the events that occur in the sky and on earth until the seventh act. The cupu was a gift from his mother and was a gift from Batara Surya at the time of Dewi Indradi's marriage to Resi Gotama.

One day, when Dewi Anjani was playing with her cupu, her two sisters came. They were very happy with the cupu, then went to their father to ask for it. Dewi Anjani said that the cupu was a gift from her mother. Dewi Indradi could not answer where it came from; he stays silent. This angered Resi Gotama, so that his wife was said to be a "tugu" and thrown down on the border of the Alengka state.

Due to being a bone of contention for the three brothers, finally Cupu Manik Astagina was dumped by Resi Gotama. The cap fell in the Sumala lake, while the mother sank in the Nirmala lake. The three brothers chased after him followed by their respective caregivers, namely, Jambawan (Subali's caregiver), Menda (Sugriwa's caregiver), and Endang Suwarsih (Dewi Anjani's caregiver). Subali, Sugriwa, with his two caregivers then arrived at the Sumala lake and immediately plunged into it. Dewi Anjani and her nanny who came later just sat on the edge of the lake. Due to the hot sun, Subali and Sugriwa washed their faces, feet and hands, causing the body parts that were exposed to the water to turn into wanara. While diving in search of the cupu, they met each other but did not know each other, so there were accusations that eventually became a fight. Then they came to their senses and came out of the lake, and went to their father to beg to be restored to their original form. But his father had no power to help.

Rishi Gotama ordered them all to meditate and begged the gods to be returned like humans. Dewi Anjani imprisoned nyantoka (living as a cantoka/frog), Subali imprisoned ngalong (living as a big bat), and Sugriwa imprisoned ngidang (living as a deer) in the Sunyapringga forest; all accompanied by their respective caregivers. Dewi Anjani, who was imprisoned in Madirda Lake, arrived at Hyang Pawana (Batara Bayu), then a love affair ensued, so that Dewi Anjani had a son Maruti in the form of a white-haired Wanara. Dewi Anjani finally got God's forgiveness, returned to her beautiful face and was buried in the palace of the nymphs.

== In popular culture ==
A number of Indian films have been made on Anjana. These include: Sati Anjani (1922) by Shree Nath Patankar, Sati Anjani (1932), Sati Anjani (1934) by Kanjibhai Rathod.

Anjana is also portrayed in several TV serials. They are:

- 1976: Portrayed by Durga Khote in the film Bajrangbali.
- 1997: Portrayed by Phalguni Parekh in Jai Hanuman.
- 2008: Portrayed by Hetal Yadav in Ramayan.
- 2015: Portrayed by Barkha Bisht Sengupta in Sankatmochan Mahabali Hanuman
- 2024: Portrayed by Kinjal Pandya in Shrimad Ramayan.
