= Anjan (given name) =

Anjan is a given name. Notable people with the name include:

- Anjan Bista (born 1998), Nepalese footballer
- Anjan Chakravartty, American philosopher
- Anjan Chatterjee (born 1960), Indian hotelier and founder of Speciality Group of Restaurants
- Anjan Chatterjee (neuroscientist) (born 1958), Indian-American neurologist
- Anjan Choudhury (1944–2007), Bengali filmmaker
- Anjan Das (1949–2014), Bengali film director
- Anjan Dutt (born 1953), Bengali singer, composer and film director
- Anjan Dutta (politician) (1952-2016), Indian politician
- Anjan Lahiri, Indian-American businessman
- Anjan Mukherjee, American businessman
- Aanjjan Srivastav (born 1948), Indian actor
- Anjan Sundaram (born 1983), Indian-American journalist
- Anjan Kumar Yadav (born 1961), Indian politician

== See also ==
- A. R. Anjan Umma (born 1955), Sri Lankan politician and teacher
- Atul Kumar Anjan (1955-2024), Indian politician
- Zahidur Rahman Anjan, Bangladeshi film director
