= Anjana, Ayodhya =

Village in India

Anjana
- Village
- Location within Uttar Pradesh Location within India
- Coordinates: 26.66699°N 82.24944°E
- Country: India
- State: Uttar Pradesh
- District: Ayodhya
- Subdistrict: Pura Bazar
- Time zone: UTC+05:30 (IST)
- Pincode: 224172

Anjana is a village in the Pura Bazar block in the Ayodhya district of Uttar Pradesh, India.
