= Anjani Khurd =

Village in Maharashtra, India

Anjani Khurd Anjani Kh
- Village
- Location in Maharashtra, India
- Coordinates: 20.066906°N 76.478437°E
- Country: India
- State: Maharashtra
- District: Buldhana
- Elevation: 454 m (1,490 ft)

Population (2011)
  - Total: 3,032

Languages
  - Official: Marathi
- Time zone: UTC+05:30 (IST)
- PIN: 443301
- Post office: Mehkar
- Telephone code: 07260
- Vehicle registration: MH 28

Anjani Khurd is a village in Lonar taluka, Buldhana district, Maharashtra, India.

The village located 83 km towards south from district headquarters Buldhana and 466 km from Mumbai.

The nearest railway station located 75 km away in Jalna and the nearest airport located 115 km away in Aurangabad.

== Demography ==
The village has total population of 3032 of which 1566 are males while 1466 are females and the population of children under the age of 6 is 381 which makes 12.57% of total population of village according to census 2011. The average sex ratio of the village is 936 which is higher than Maharashtra state average of 929 and the other side child sex ratio is 693, lower than Maharashtra average of 894 as per census 2011.

In 2011, The literacy rate of the village was 83.82% compared to 82.34% of Maharashtra which is the higher literacy rate compared to Maharashtra. The male literacy stands at 90.38% while female literacy rate was 77.10%.

== Landmarks ==
The village has a temple of lord SHIVA on the south side and also has an masjid (Jama masjid ).

=== Colleges ===
- Janata Junior College of Arts & Science.

=== Schools ===
- Primary School
- Janta Vidyalaya
- Janta Junior College

=== Temples ===
- Lord Shiv Temple
- Lord Ganesh Temple
- Jagdamba Devi Temple
- God Shriram Temple
- God Hanuman Temple
- Santoshi Mata Temple
- Sant Savta Mali Temple
