= Qing'an County =

Qing'an County 庆安县
- County
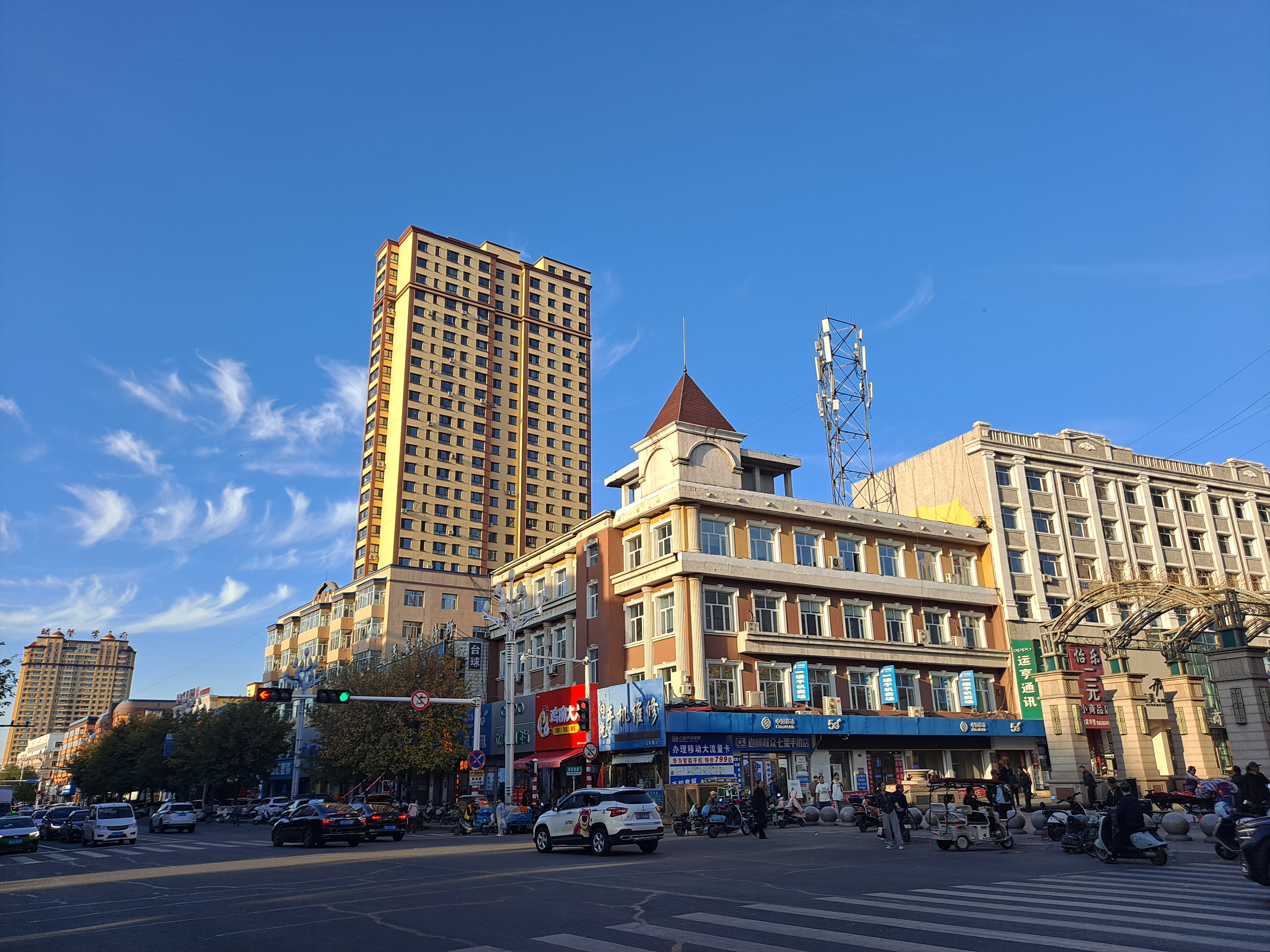
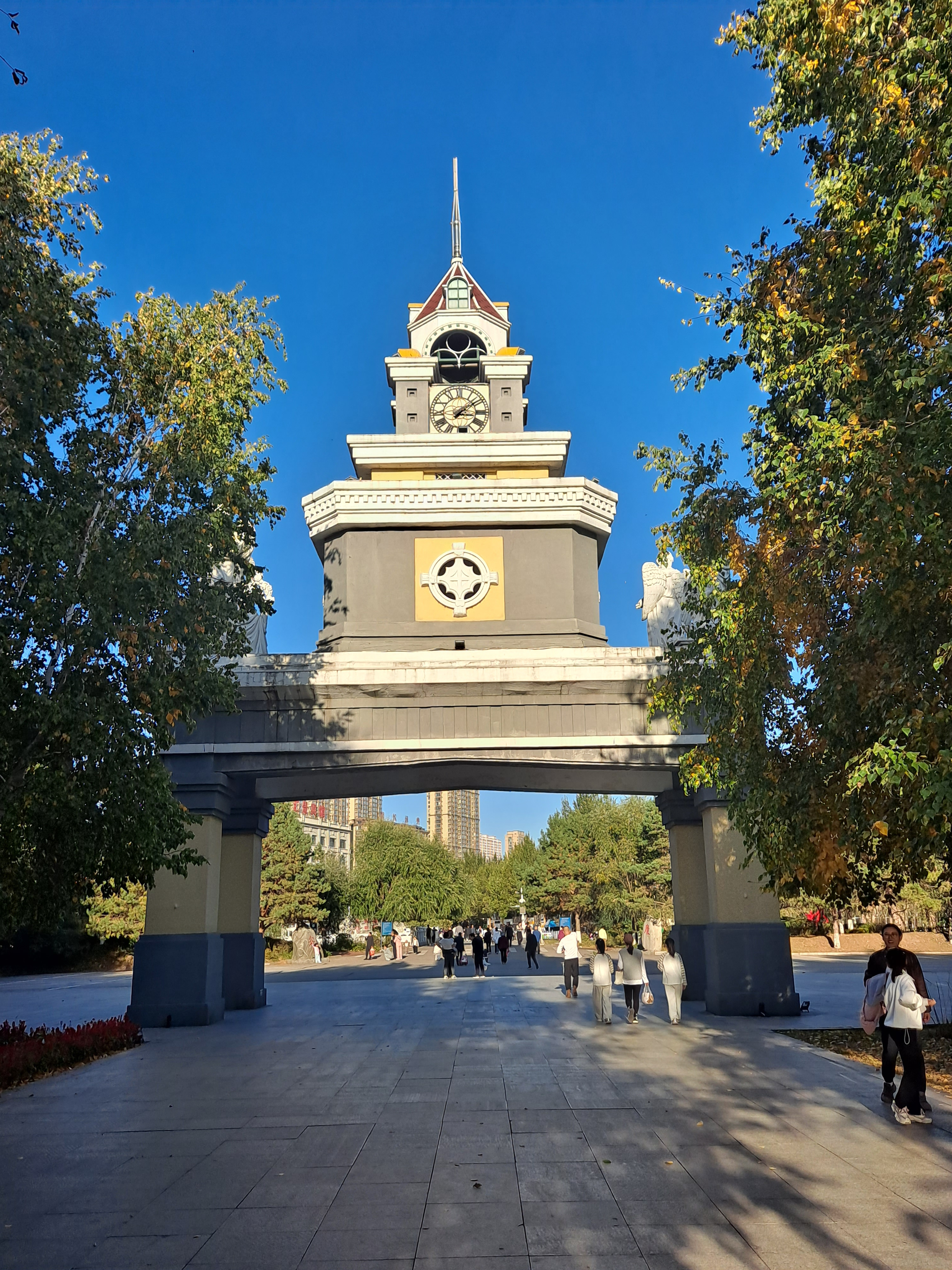
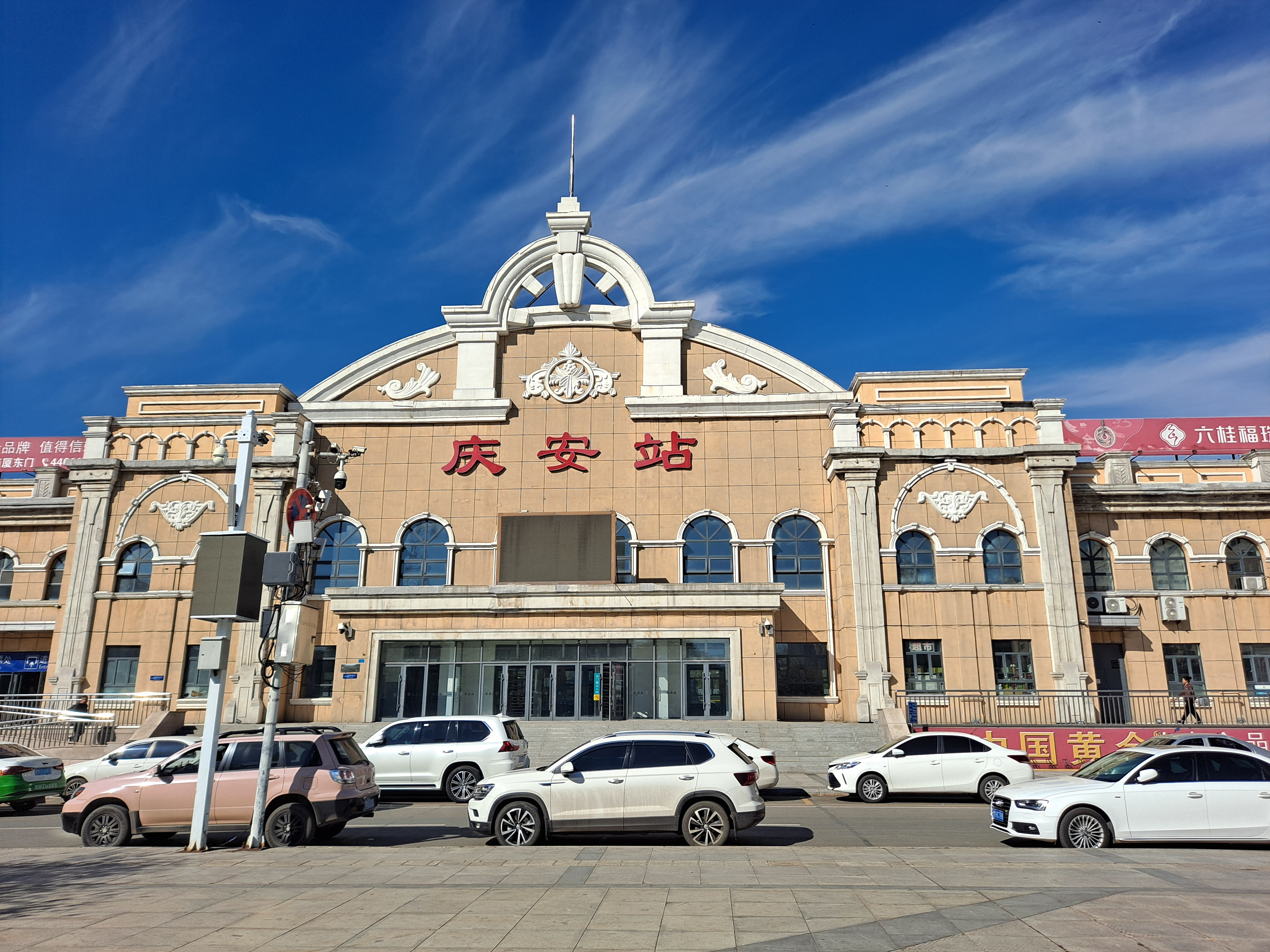
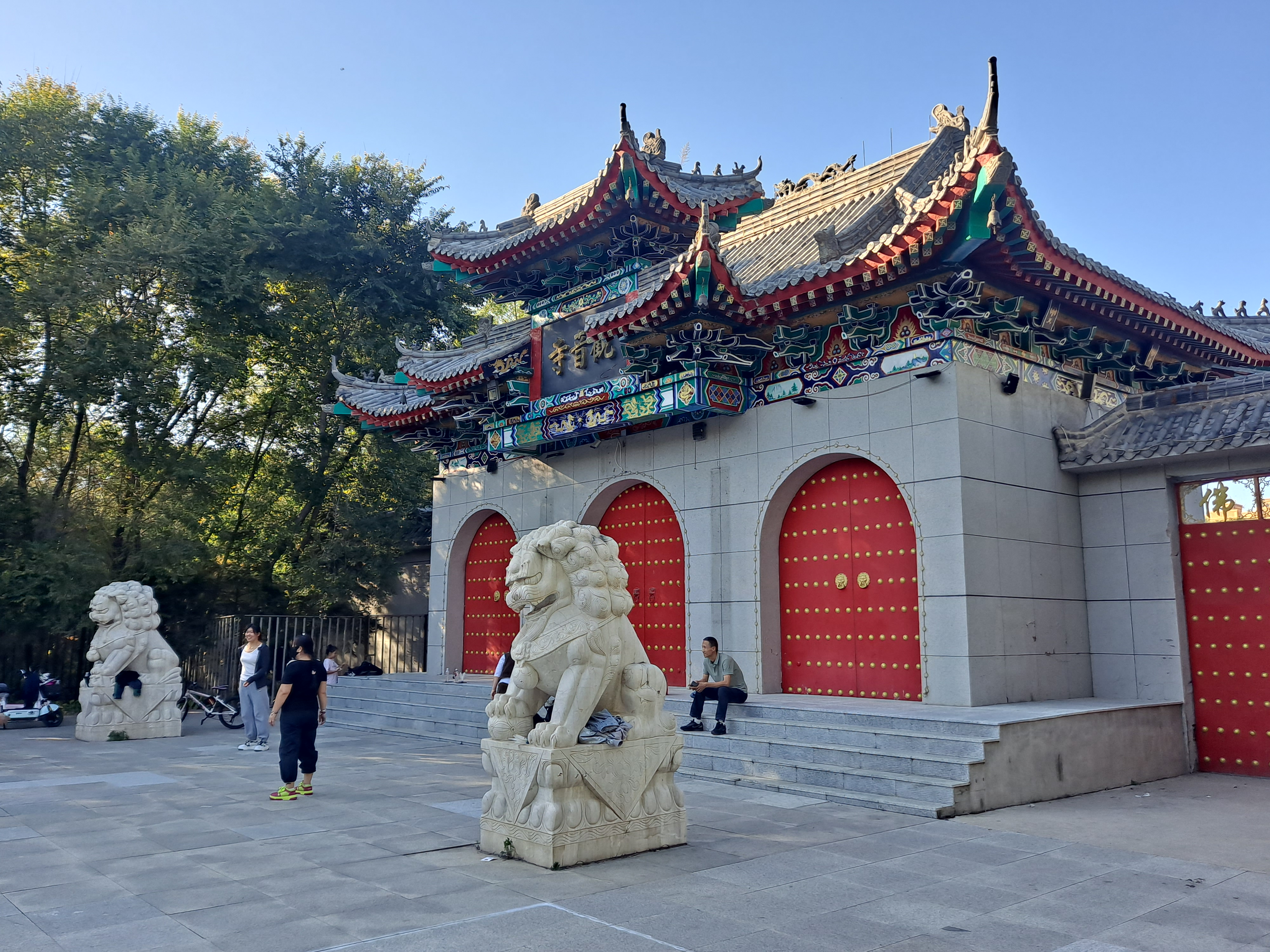
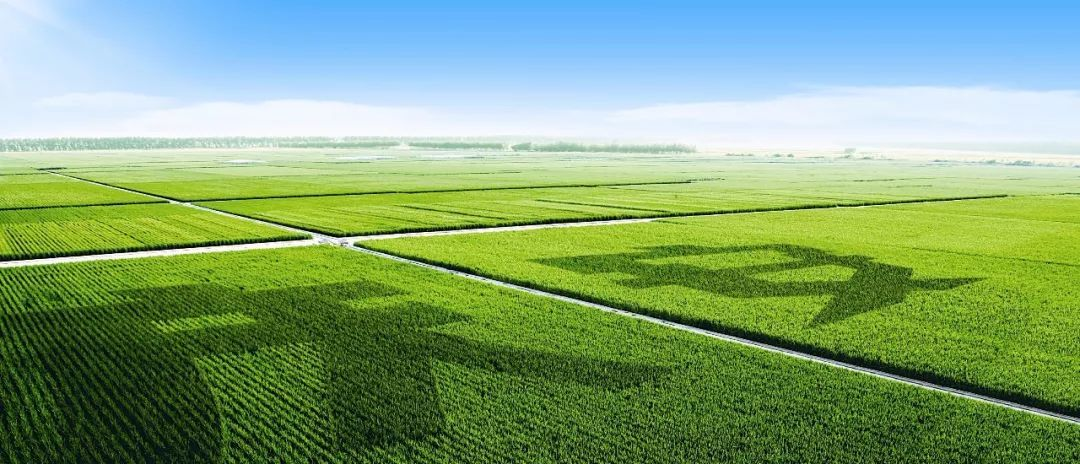
- A street in Qing'an Qing'an People's Park Qing'an railway station Guanyin Temple in Qing'an Qing'an rice field painting

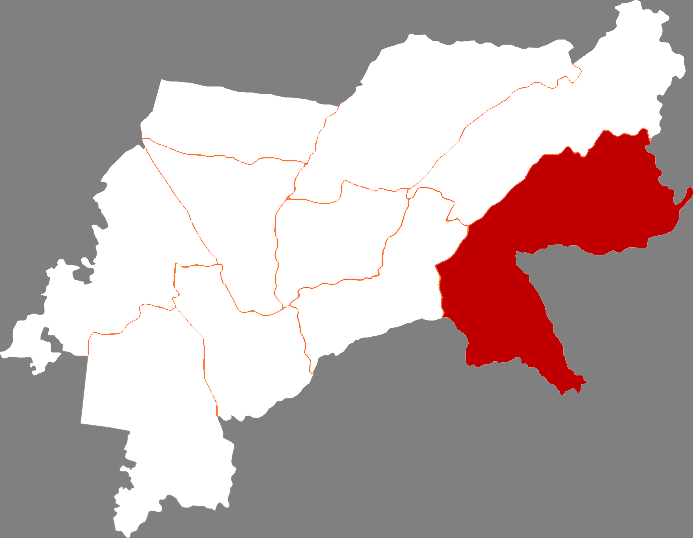
- Qing'an in Suihua

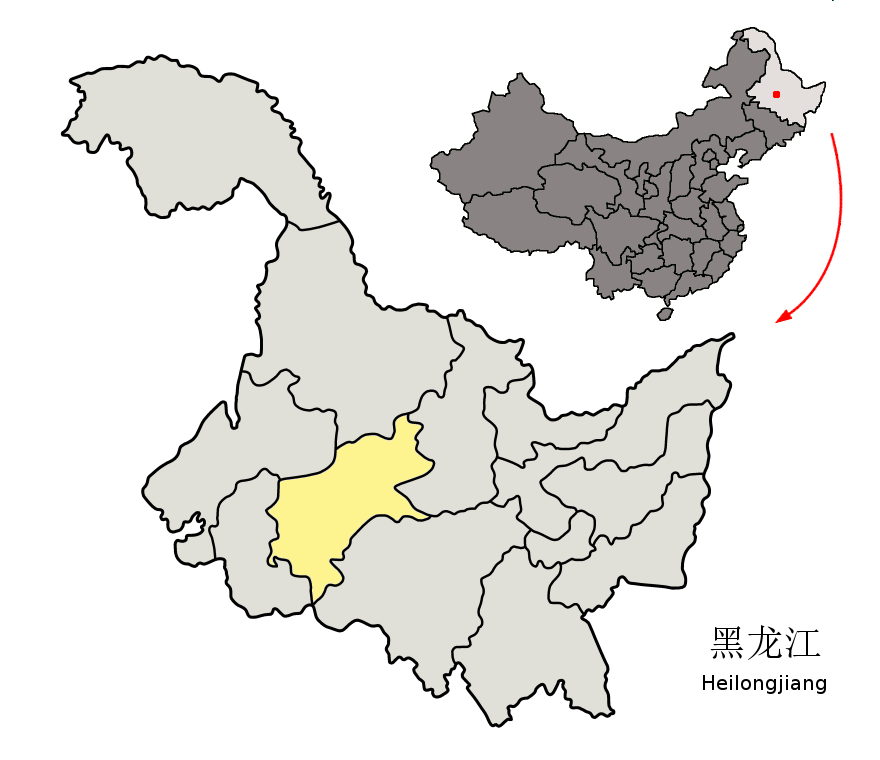
- Suihua in Heilongjiang
- Coordinates: 46°52′48″N 127°30′29″E
- Country: People's Republic of China
- Province: Heilongjiang
- Prefecture-level city: Suihua

Area
  - Land: 5,468.7 km^{2} (2,111.5 sq mi)

Population (2010)
  - Total: 386,162
  - Density: 70.613/km^{2} (182.89/sq mi)
- Time zone: UTC+8 (China Standard)

Qing'an County (simplified Chinese: 庆安县; traditional Chinese: 慶安縣; pinyin: Qìng'ān Xiàn) is a county of west-central Heilongjiang province, People's Republic of China. It is under the jurisdiction of the prefecture-level city of Suihua.

== Administrative divisions ==
Qing'an County is divided into 4 subdistricts, 8 towns and 6 townships.

3 subdistricts

- Jikang (吉康街道), Qingrui (庆瑞街道), Pingshun (平顺街道), Antai (安泰街道)

8 towns

- Qing'an (庆安镇), Minyue (民乐镇), Daluo (大罗镇), Ping'an (平安镇), Qinlao (勤劳镇), Jiusheng (久胜镇), Tongle (同乐镇), Liuhe (柳河镇)

6 townships

- Jianmin (建民乡), Jubaoshan (巨宝山乡), Fengshou (丰收乡), Fazhan (发展乡), Zhifu (致富乡), Huansheng (欢胜乡)

== Demographics ==
The population of the district was 366,985 in 1999.

== Climate ==
Climate data for Qing'an, elevation 182 m (597 ft), (1991–2020 normals, extremes 1981–present)
Month	Jan	Feb	Mar	Apr	May	Jun	Jul	Aug	Sep	Oct	Nov	Dec	Year
Record high °C (°F)	0.0 (32.0)	8.5 (47.3)	18.9 (66.0)	28.5 (83.3)	34.5 (94.1)	37.5 (99.5)	36.7 (98.1)	35.8 (96.4)	31.3 (88.3)	25.8 (78.4)	14.7 (58.5)	3.9 (39.0)	37.5 (99.5)
Mean daily maximum °C (°F)	−14.8 (5.4)	−8.6 (16.5)	1.2 (34.2)	12.5 (54.5)	20.6 (69.1)	25.6 (78.1)	27.5 (81.5)	25.8 (78.4)	20.7 (69.3)	11.1 (52.0)	−2.0 (28.4)	−12.6 (9.3)	8.9 (48.1)
Daily mean °C (°F)	−20.8 (−5.4)	−15.4 (4.3)	−4.8 (23.4)	6.4 (43.5)	14.4 (57.9)	20.2 (68.4)	22.8 (73.0)	20.7 (69.3)	14.4 (57.9)	5.4 (41.7)	−7.0 (19.4)	−17.9 (−0.2)	3.2 (37.8)
Mean daily minimum °C (°F)	−26.4 (−15.5)	−21.9 (−7.4)	−10.6 (12.9)	0.4 (32.7)	8.4 (47.1)	15.2 (59.4)	18.4 (65.1)	16.2 (61.2)	8.8 (47.8)	0.3 (32.5)	−11.5 (11.3)	−22.8 (−9.0)	−2.1 (28.2)
Record low °C (°F)	−41.2 (−42.2)	−38.3 (−36.9)	−33.9 (−29.0)	−13.0 (8.6)	−5.4 (22.3)	3.6 (38.5)	9.0 (48.2)	6.0 (42.8)	−5.4 (22.3)	−16.3 (2.7)	−31.1 (−24.0)	−39.0 (−38.2)	−41.2 (−42.2)
Average precipitation mm (inches)	4.3 (0.17)	4.1 (0.16)	12.7 (0.50)	22.7 (0.89)	52.7 (2.07)	100.7 (3.96)	150.1 (5.91)	124.0 (4.88)	61.4 (2.42)	28.6 (1.13)	12.2 (0.48)	8.0 (0.31)	581.5 (22.88)
Average precipitation days (≥ 0.1 mm)	5.7	4.0	5.5	7.5	11.7	14.1	14.6	14.2	9.6	7.5	6.2	7.2	107.8
Average snowy days	8.9	6.7	7.8	3.4	0.1	0	0	0	0	2.6	8.3	11.0	48.8
Average relative humidity (%)	75	71	63	56	58	69	79	81	73	66	70	76	70
Mean monthly sunshine hours	174.1	207.7	255.9	240.4	257.8	238.5	230.5	222.5	225.6	195.4	170.6	152.0	2,571
Percentage possible sunshine	62	71	69	59	55	50	49	51	61	59	61	58	59
Source: China Meteorological Administration All-time May Record
