= Ajan (surname) =

Ajan or Aján is a surname. Notable people with the surname include:

- Syed Ajan, Afghan Guantanamo Bay detainee
- Tamás Aján (born 1939), Hungarian International Weightlifting Federation president and International Olympic Committee member

== Fictional characters ==
- Matilda Ajan, character in the anime series Mobile Suit Gundam
