= Anjani, Mainpuri =

Village in Uttar Pradesh, India

Anjani
- Village
- Location in Uttar Pradesh, India
- Coordinates: 27.28942°N 79.03789°E
- Country: India
- State: Uttar Pradesh
- District: Mainpuri
- Tehsil: Mainpuri

Area
  - Total: 2.776 km^{2} (1.072 sq mi)

Population (2011)
  - Total: 2,598
  - Density: 935.9/km^{2} (2,424/sq mi)
- Time zone: UTC+5:30 (IST)

Anjani (Añjănī) is a village in Mainpuri block of Mainpuri district, Uttar Pradesh, India. As of 2011, it had a population of 2,598, in 359 households.

== Demographics ==
As of 2011, Anjani had a population of 2,598, in 359 households. This population was 54.5% male (1,417) and 45.5% female (1,181). The 0-6 age group numbered 334 (197 male and 137 female), or 12.9% of the total population. 205 residents were members of Scheduled Castes, or 7.9% of the total.

The 1981 census recorded Anjani as having a population of 1,514 people, in 204 households.

The 1961 census recorded Anjani as comprising 1 hamlet, with a total population of 1,061 people (585 male and 486 female), in 189 households and 100 physical houses. The area of the village was given as 692 acres.

== Infrastructure ==
As of 2011, Anjani had 3 primary schools; it did not have any healthcare facilities. Drinking water was provided by hand pump and tube well/borehole; there were no public toilets. The village had a post office but no public library; there was at least some access to electricity for all purposes. Streets were made of both kachcha and pakka materials.
