= Budha =

Personification of the planet Mercury as a deity in Hinduism

- Personification of the planet Mercury
- Member of Navagraha
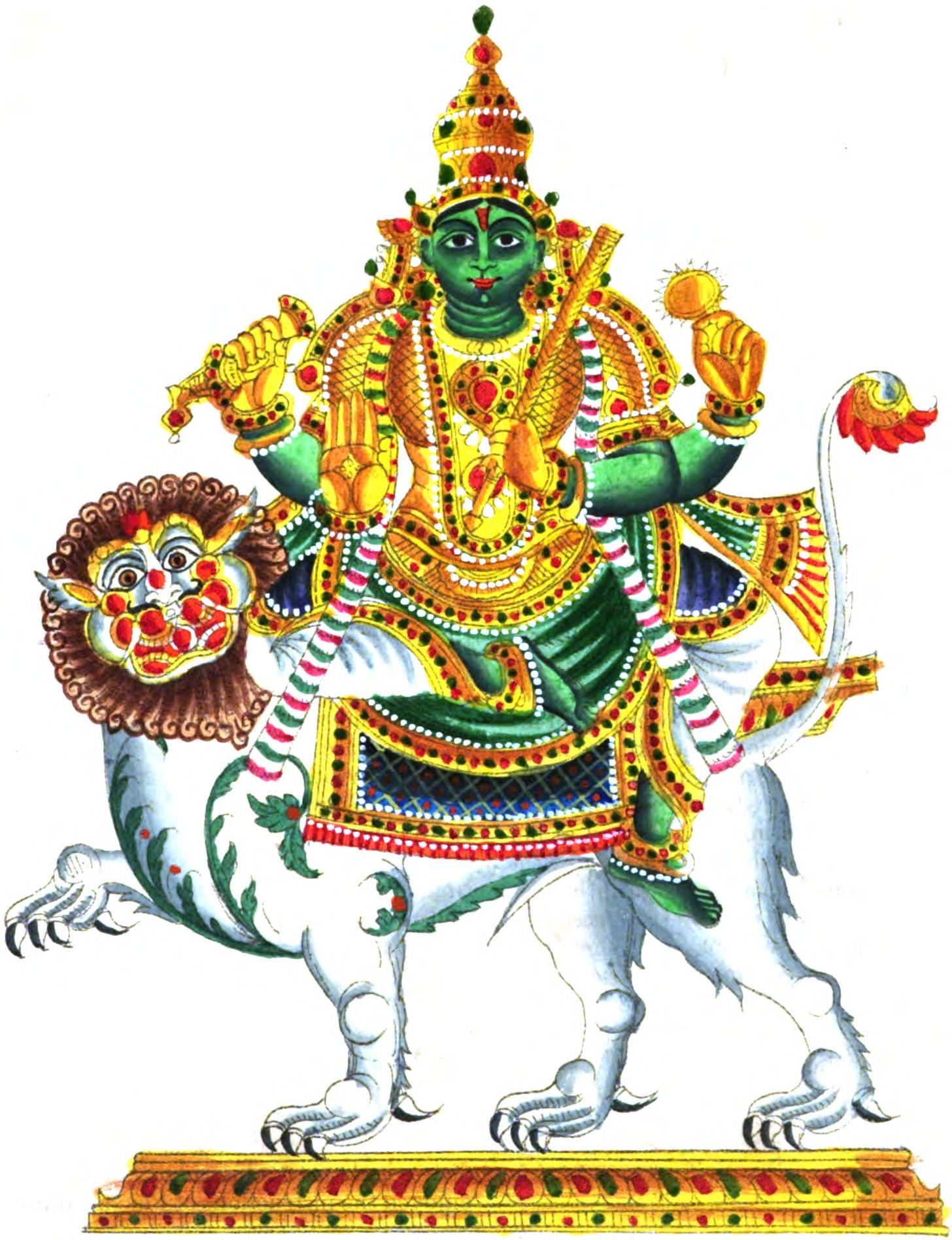
- Depiction of Budha from the 1842 book The Complete Hindu Pantheon by E. A. Rodrigues
- Devanagari: बुध
- Affiliation: Deva; Navagraha
- Abode: Budhaloka
- Planet: Mercury
- Day: Wednesday
- Color: Green
- Number: 5 , 14 , 23
- Mount: a lion and a chariot pulled by eight yellow horses

Genealogy
- Parents: Chandra (father); Tara (mother)
- Consort: Ila
- Children: Pururavas

Budha (Sanskrit: बुध) is the Sanskrit word for the planet Mercury, personified as the god of intelligence.

He is also known as Somaya or Rohinaya. He rules over the nakshatras (lunar mansions) of Ashlesha, Jyeshtha, and Revati.

== Planet ==
Indian astronomical observations of the planet Budha (Mercury) are recorded in several Sanskrit texts from the first millennium CE. These include the 5th century Aryabhatiya by Aryabhata, the 6th century the Romaka by Latadeva and Panca Siddhantika by Varahamihira, the 7th century Khandakhadyaka by Brahmagupta , and the 8th century Sisyadhivrddida by Lalla. These texts describe the characteristics of planetary motion. Other texts, such as the Surya Siddhanta (completed between the 5th century CE and 10th century CE), present information on various planets alongside the mythologies of their associated deities.

Different manuscripts versions of these texts vary slightly in their measurements of Budha's revolutions, apogee, epicycles, nodal longitudes, orbital inclination, and other parameters. Scholars interpret these variations as evidence that the texts were revised over time. For example, both the Khandakhadyaka and one version of the Surya Siddhanta state that Budha completes 17,937,000 axial revolutions every 4,320,000 years, and had an apogee (aphelion) of 220 degrees in 499 CE. Another manuscript of Surya Siddhanta, however, increases the number revolutions by 60 to 17,937,060, and records the apogee to 220 degrees and 26 seconds.

Hindu scholars of the first millennium CE estimated the sidereal revolutions of Budha and other planets through astronomical studies, their results differed slightly from one another.

Sanskrit texts: How many days for Budha (Mercury) to complete its orbit?
Source	Estimated time per sidereal revolution
Surya Siddhanta	87 days, 23 hours, 16 minutes, 22.3 seconds
Siddhanta Shiromani	87 days, 23 hours, 16 minutes, 41.5 seconds
Ptolemy (Almagest)	87 days, 23 hours, 16 minutes, 42.9 seconds
20th century calculation	87 days, 23 hours, 15 minutes, 43.9 seconds

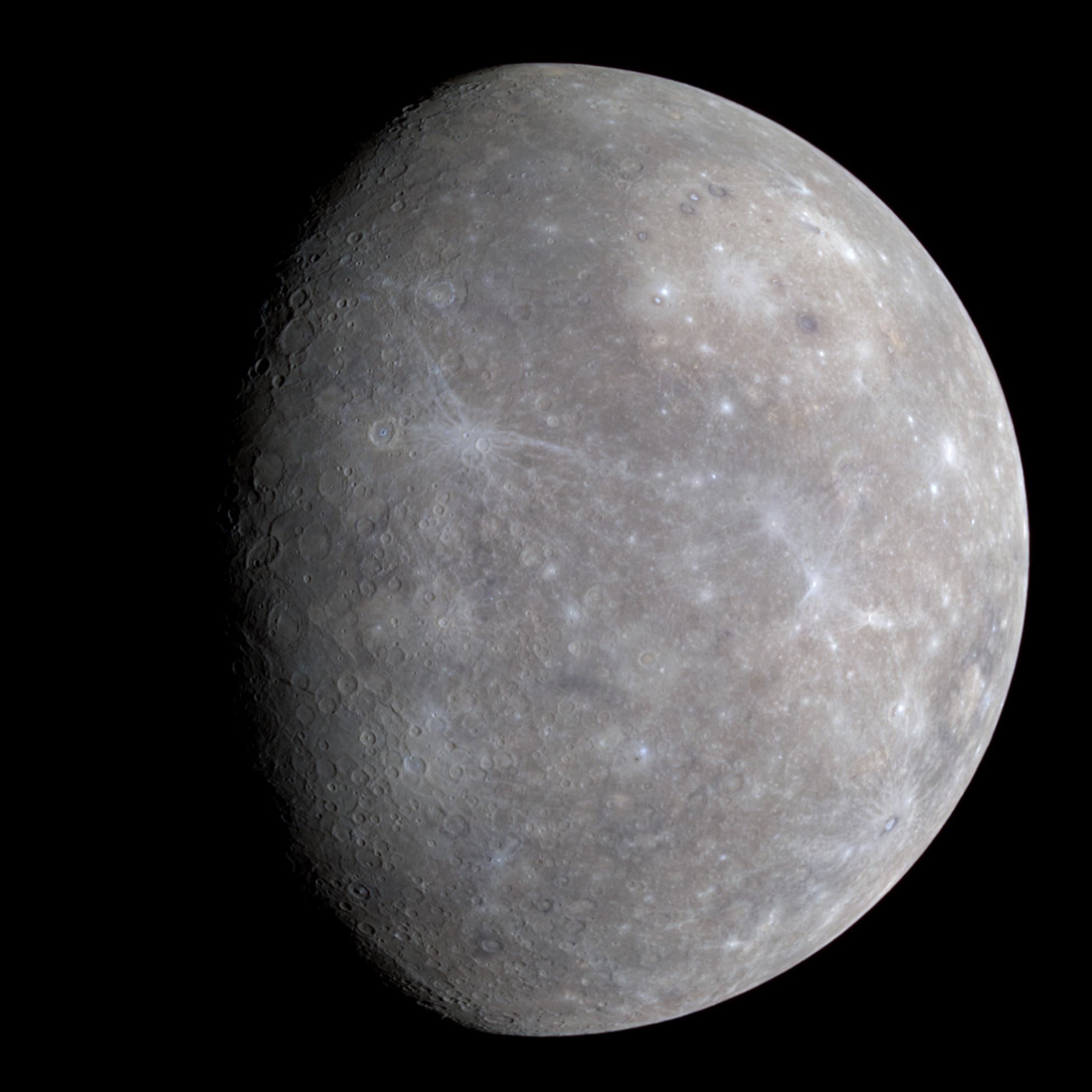
The planet Mercury

== Legends ==
In Hindu mythology, Budha is a deity and the son of Chandra and Rohini or Tara. The myth of the Tarakamaya War describes the events leading to his birth from Tara. Budha married Ila, with whom he had a son, King Pururavas.

One of the earliest mentions of Budha appears in the Vedic text Pancavimsa Brahmana. The deity also appears in other ancient texts such as the Shatapatha Brahmana though not in the context of astrology.

== Calendar and Hindu astrology ==
The word 'Budhavara' or Wednesday in the Hindu calendar derives from Budha. In Greco-Roman and other Indo-European calendars, "Wednesday" is also dedicated to the planet Mercury (for eg. "day of Odin").

Budha is part of the Navagraha (nine planetary deities) in the Hindu zodiac system, where he is considered benevolent, associated with an agile mind and memory. The role and importance of the Navagraha developed over time with various influences. Glorification of planetary bodies and their astrological significance appeared as early as the Vedic period and was recorded in the Vedas. The earliest known work of astrology in India is the Vedanga Jyotisha, which began to be compiled in the 14th century BCE. The classical planets, including Mercury, were referenced in the Atharvaveda around 1000 BCE.

The three nakshatras (lunar mansions) ruled by Budha are Ashlesha, Jyestha and Revati.

The Navagraha system was furthered by developed through contributions from Western Asia, including Zoroastrian and Hellenistic influences. The Yavanajataka, (literally Science of the yavanas, referring to the Greeks) or Science of the Yavanas, was written by the Indo-Greek named "Yavaneshvara" ("Lord of the Greeks") under the rule of the Western Kshatrapa king Rudrakarman I. The Yavanajataka written in 120 CE, is often credited with standardizing Indian astrology. The Navagraha system continued to develop and culminated during the Shaka era under the Shaka (Scythian) people. Contributions by the Shaka people later became the basis of the Indian national calendar, also called the Shaka calendar.

The name Budha also forms the root for the word for Wednesday in many other Indian languages. In modern Hindi, Odia, Telugu, Bengali, Marathi, Urdu, Kannada and Gujarati, Wednesday is called Budhavara; in Tamil: Budhan kizhamai; in Malayalam: Budhanazhcha; in Thai: Wan Phut (วันพุธ).

== Iconography ==
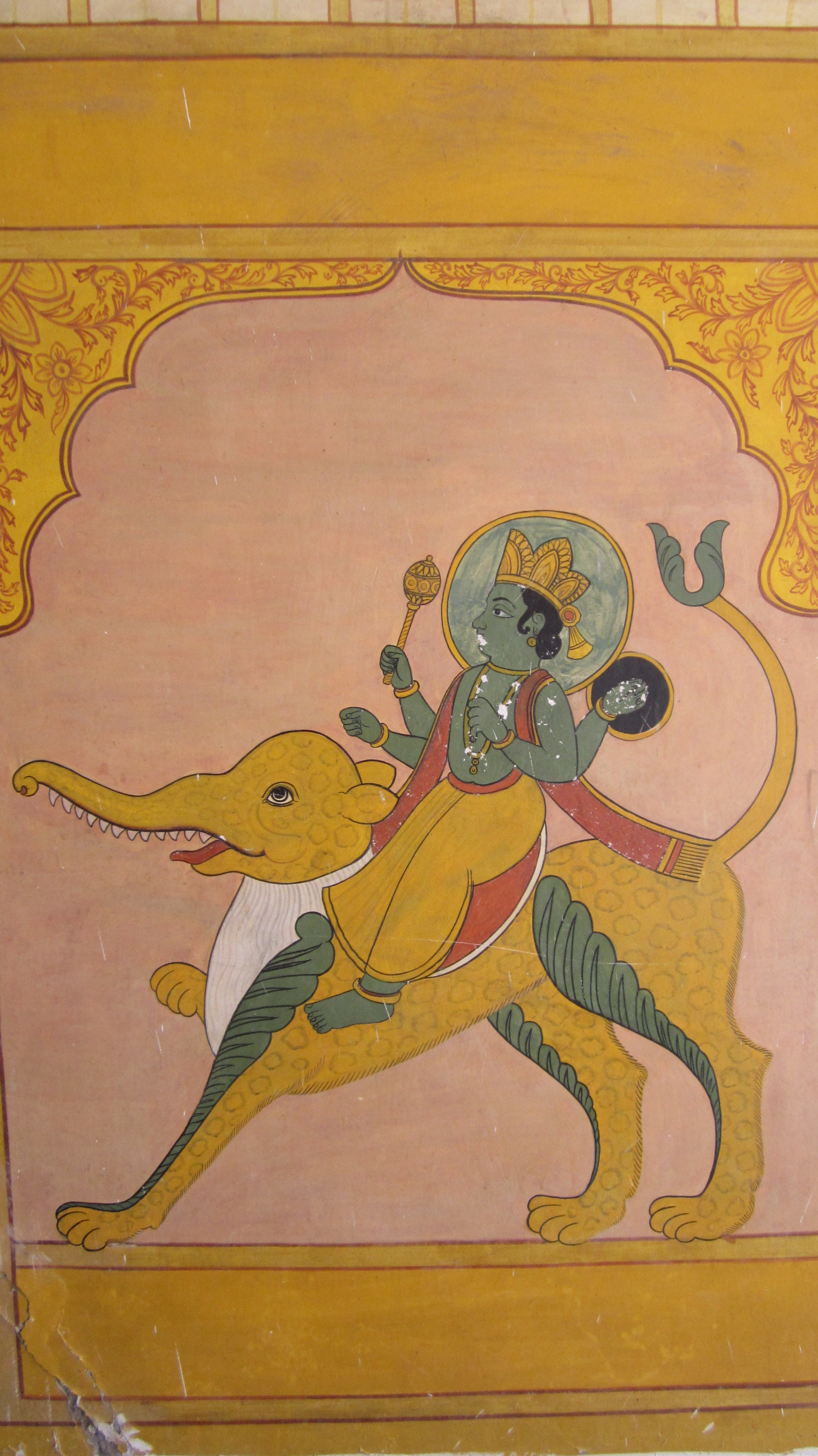
A Painting of Budha in Jawahar Kala Kendra, Jaipur

According to Roshen Dalal, Budha's iconography depicts him as a benevolent male deity with green body, draped in yellow clothes, and holding a scimitar, a club, and a shield. He is shown riding a chariot drawn by eight yellow horses. In some illustrations, he has four arms and rides a lion; in the Budha Temple, he is depicted riding a lion.

== See also ==
- Days of the week
- Navagraha
  - List of Navagraha temples
- Nakshatra
  - List of Natchathara temples
  - Jyotisha
  - Saptarishi
- List of Hindu deities
