= Antai, Kiribati =

Antai
- Location in Kiribati
- Coordinates: 2°02′00″N 173°17′00″E
- Country: Kiribati

Population
  - Total: 2,020

Antai is a small village located in the north-east of the Marakei atoll in the Gilbert Islands of the island nation of Kiribati in Pacicfic Ocean. In 2017 the place had about 164 inhabitants.

== Geography ==
Antai is located in the north-east of Marakei, near the main town of Rawannawi and north of Tekuanga. There is a traditional meeting house in the village called the Antai Maneaba.

== Climate ==
The climate is tropical, moderated by constantly blowing winds. Like the rest of Marakei, Antai is occasionally hit by cyclones.
