= Bhaktapur Cancer Hospital =

Hospital in Bhaktapur, Bagmati, Nepal

Bhaktapur Cancer Hospital भक्तपुर क्यान्सर अस्पताल
- Government of Nepal
- Location within Nepal

Geography
- Location: Bhaktapur, Bagmati Province, Nepal
- Coordinates: 27.673150°N 85.422172°E}

Organisation
- Care system: Public
- Type: Specialist

Services
- Emergency department: No
- Beds: 150
- Specialty: Cancer

History
- Founded: 1992

Links
- Website: bch.org.np

The Bhaktapur Cancer Hospital (Nepali: भक्तपुर क्यान्सर अस्पताल) is a cancer hospital located in Bhaktapur, Bagmati Province, Nepal, run by the Government of Nepal. The hospital currently has 150 beds and specializes in cancer treatment, study and research. It is one of the leading centres for cancer treatment in the country.

== Objectives ==
The objectives of this hospital are

- To establish the hospital as a tertiary referral center.
- To provide palliative care services, pain management and cancer support programs.
- To introduce computer based hospital management information system.
- To provide charity services to poor and needy people.
- To conduct cancer registry and telemedicine.
- To play role in the training of manpower.
- To do academic and research work in cancer.
