= Surendrapuri =

Hindu pilgrimage site in Telangana, India

Coordinates: 17°33′54″N 78°56′40″E

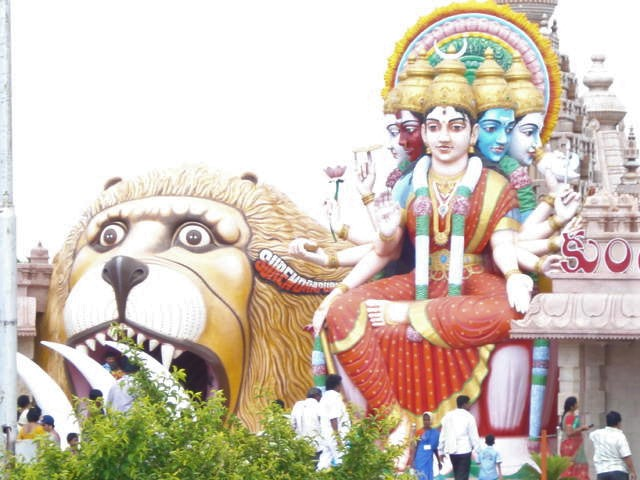
- Kunda Satyanarayana Kaladhamam
- Interactive map of Surendrapuri
- Location: Yadadri, Telangana, India
- Website: www.surendrapuri.in

Surendrapuri is a religious tourism destination located near Hyderabad, Telangana, India in the Yadadri Bhuvanagiri district. The 17-acre religious complex includes the Kunda Satyanarayana Kaladhamam - India's first mythological museum, Panchamukha Hanumadeeswara Devasthanam (Hindu temple), Navagraha temples, Nagakoti idol, and Surendrapuri’s iconic two-sided Panchamukha Hanuman-Shiva statue.

Surendrapuri was designed and built by Satyanarayana Kunda and it was opened to the public from May, 2003. It is located 10 km from the Bhuvanagiri Railway Station and 2 km from the Yadadri Bus Terminal. 60 Kms from Hyderabad. Other popular tourist attractions near Surendrapuri are Yadadri’s Lakshmi Narasimha Temple, Bhongir Fort, and Kolanupaka Temple.

== Kunda Satyanarayana Kaladhamam ==
Kunda Satyanarayana Kaladhamam, named after its creator, Satyanarayana Kunda, is an Indian mythological museum, inaugurated by the former Governor of Andhra Pradesh, Narayan Dutt Tiwari, in February, 2009. The 3 km pathway inside the Kaladhamam (museum) covers over 3,000 statues, sculptures, and structures, which fall into one of 4 categories: Temples of India, Epics of India, Puranas, and Saptalokas.

=== Temples of India ===
Kunda Satyanarayana Kaladhamam showcases the architecture of upwards of 100 Indian temples in the form of life-sized replicas. The collection includes some of India’s most popular holy shrines such as the Golden Temple of Amritsar, the Ramanathaswamy Temple of Rameswaram, the Jagannath Temple of Puri, the Kali Temple of Kolkata, the Somnath Temple of Gujarat, the Kedarnath Temple of Uttarakhand, the Venkateswara Temple of Tirupati, the Guruvayur Sri Krishna Temple, etc.

=== Epics of India ===
The museum contains depictions of important scenes from Indian epics like the Ramayana, Mahabharata, Bhagavata, and Buddha Charita, among others, in the form of statues and sculptures.

=== Puranas ===
Key events from the Hindu Puranas, such as the Ksheera Sagara Madhan, Gajendra Moksham, Kurukshetra War, etc. are exhibited as sculptures and murals inside the museum.

=== Saptalokas ===
The Saptalokas or 7 celestial worlds of Hindu mythology, are recreated through sculptures and carvings, each of them designed in accordance with the ancient texts.

The exhibits inside the Kaladhamam are both, open air and indoors, depending on the size of the replica and the mythological scene portrayed.

== Panchamukha Hanumadeeswara Devasthanam ==
Associated with the Kanchi Kamakoti Peetham (Hindu Institution) from Kanchipuram, Surendrapuri’s Panchamukha Hanumadeeswara Devasthanam temple’s entire construction is done in accordance with Vaastushastra and Agamashastra. The temple’s Gopuras are a blend of North and South Indian architecture. In the sanctum sanctorum, a 16-foot Panchamukha Hanuman idol is chiseled out of black stone brought from Kanchi. Within the complex, devotees also get a darshan of the Mahashivalinga of Panchamukha Parameswara (Lord Shiva), similar to that of the Pasupatinath temple in Nepal, along with the blessings of Lord Venkateswara and Goddess Lakshmi.

== Navagraha Temples ==
The temple complex also contains Navagraha Temples, housing the presiding Navagraha deities and their consorts with a dedicated shrine for each.

== Nagakoti Idol ==
Situated atop the Nagadri Hill, is a 101-foot Shivalinga encircled by the giant snake, Kaalasarpa. Holding 10 million small Shivalingas made from anthill mud, the Nagakoti is worshipped by its devotees in the hopes of salvation from the ill-effects of the Naga Dosha, Kuja Dosha and Kaalasarpa Dosha.

== Panchamukha Hanuman-Shiva Statue ==
At the entrance of Surendrapuri is its oldest attraction, a 60-foot tall double-sided statue of Panchamukha or five-faced Lord Hanuman and Shiva (on the back).
