= Brihaspati =

Hindu deity

- Guru of the Devas; God of Jupiter
- Member of Navagraha
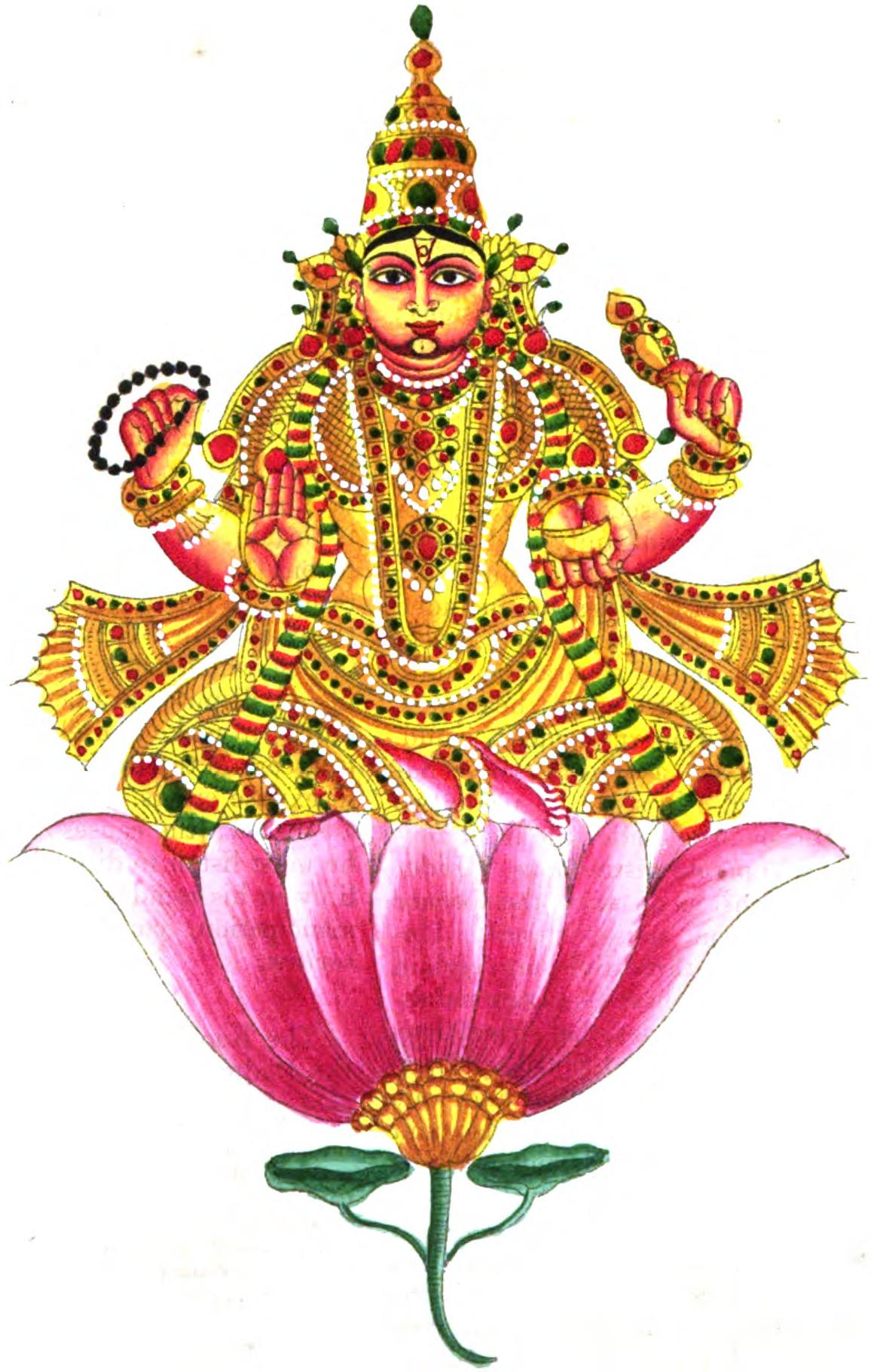
- Brihaspati Graha
- Devanagari: बृहस्पति
- Affiliation: Deva, Navagraha
- Abode: Svarga
- Planet: Jupiter
- Mantra: Om Brihaspataye Namaha
- Day: Thursday
- Color: Yellow
- Number: 3, 12, 21, 30
- Mount: chariot drawn by eight white horses

Genealogy
- Parents: Angiras (father); Surupa (mother)
- Consort: Tara
- Children: 6 sons including Shamyu and Kacha and a daughter (from from Tara); Bharadvaja and Revati from Mammata

Brihaspati (Sanskrit: बृहस्पति, IAST: Bṛhaspati) is a Hindu god. In the ancient Vedic scriptures, Brihaspati is associated with fire, and the word also refers to a god who counsels the devas and devis (gods and goddesses). In some later texts, the word refers to the largest planet of the Solar System, Jupiter, and the deity is associated with the planet as a Navagraha.

== Sage ==
Brihaspati appears in the Rigveda (pre-1000 BCE), such as in the dedications to him in the hymn 50 of Book 4; he is described as a sage born from the first great light, the one who drove away darkness, is bright and pure, and carries a special bow whose string is Rta or "cosmic order" (basis of dharma). His knowledge and character is revered, and he is considered Guru (teacher) by all the Devas. In the Vedic literature and other ancient texts, sage Brihaspati is also called by other names such as Bramanaspati, Purohita, Angirasa (son of Angiras) and Vyasa; he is sometimes identified with god Agni (fire). His wife is Tara (or goddess who personifies the stars in the sky).

The reverence for sage Brihaspati endured through the medieval period, and one of the many Dharmasastras was named after him. While the manuscripts of Brihaspati Smriti (Bṛhaspatismṛti) have not survived into the modern era, its verses were cited in other Indian texts. Scholars have made an effort to extract these cited verses, thus creating a modern reconstruction of Bṛhaspatismriti. Jolly and Aiyangar have gathered some 2,400 verses of the lost Bṛhaspatismṛti text in this manner. Brihaspati Smriti was likely a larger and more comprehensive text than Manusmriti, and the available evidence suggests that the discussion of the judicial process and jurisprudence in Brihaspati Smriti was often cited.

=== Brihaspati sutras ===
Brihaspati sutras, also called the Barhaspatya sutras, is an ancient Sanskrit text named after its author Brihaspati, known for its theories of materialism and anti-theism. Its tenets are at the foundation of the Charvaka school of non-orthodox Indian philosophy.

Some older scholars suggest that Brihaspati sutras were named after the Brihaspati in the Vedas in order to accord the texts greater credibility, but other scholars dispute this theory because the text rejects the Vedic gods.

== Planet ==
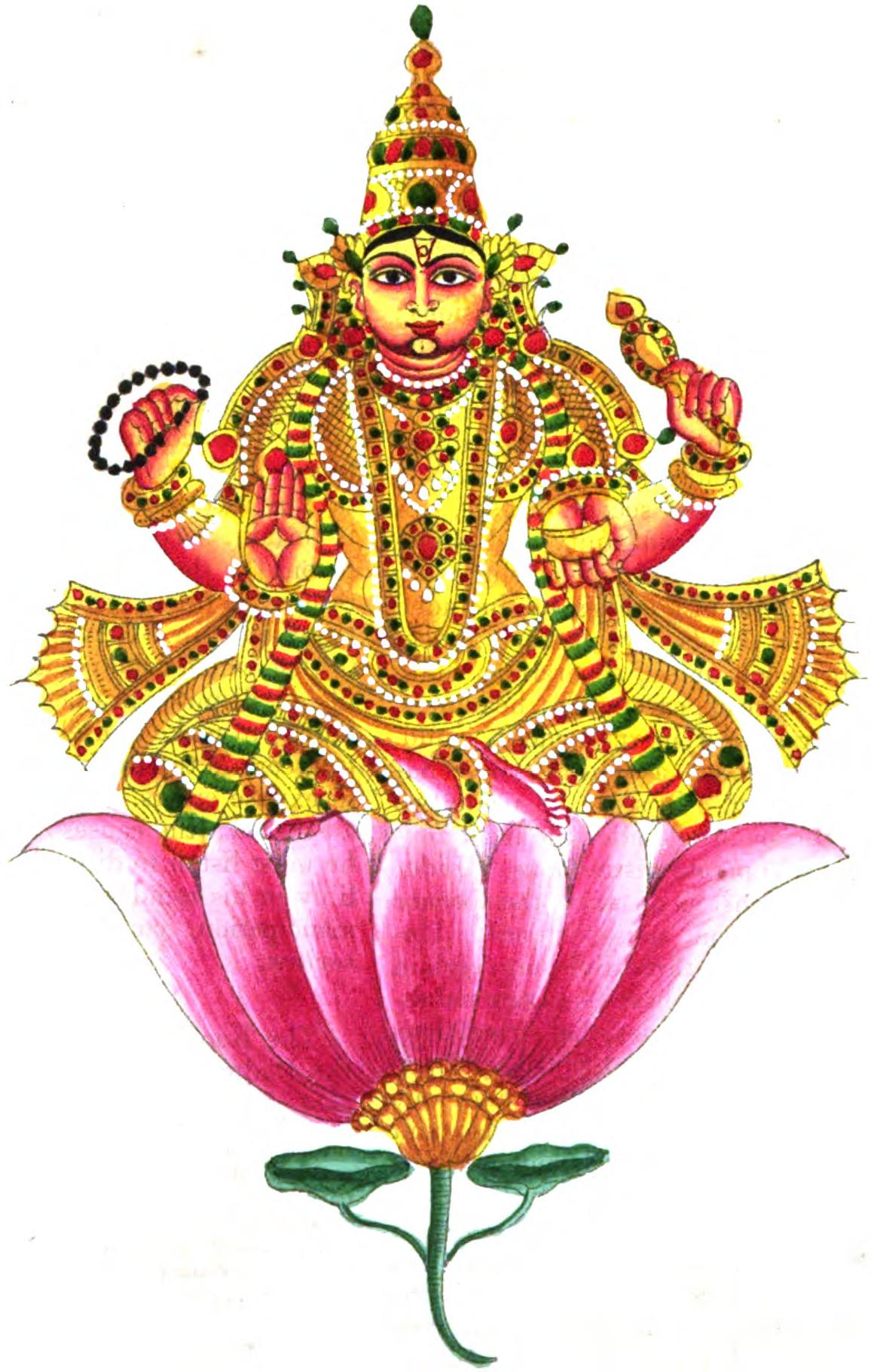
Depiction of Brihaspati from the 1842 book The Complete Hindoo Pantheon by E. A. Rodrigues

Brihaspati as a planet (Jupiter) appears in various Hindu astronomical texts in Sanskrit, such as the 5th century Aryabhatiya by Aryabhata, the 6th century Romaka by Latadeva and Panca Siddhantika by Varahamihira, the 7th century Khandakhadyaka by Brahmagupta and the 8th century Sisyadhivrddida by Lalla. These texts present Brihaspati as one of the planets and estimate the characteristics of the respective planetary motion. Other texts such as Surya Siddhanta dated to have been complete sometime between the 5th century and 10th century present their chapters on various planets with deity mythologies.

The manuscripts of these texts exist in slightly different versions, present Brihaspati's motion in the skies, but vary in their data, suggesting that the text were open and revised over their lives. The texts slightly disagree in their data, in their measurements of Brihaspati's revolutions, apogee, epicycles, nodal longitudes, orbital inclination, and other parameters. For example, both Khandakhadyaka and Surya Siddhanta of Varaha state that Brihaspati completes 364,220 revolutions every 4,320,000 earth years, an Epicycle of Apsis as 32 degrees, and had an apogee (aphelia) of 160 degrees in 499 CE; while another manuscript of Surya Siddhanta accepts the revolutions to be 364,220, but revises the apogee to 171 degrees and 16 seconds and the Epicycle slightly.

The 1st millennium CE Hindu scholars had estimated the time it took for sidereal revolutions of each planet including Brihaspati, from their astronomical studies, with slightly different results:

Sanskrit texts: How many days Brihaspati (Jupiter) takes to complete an orbit:
Source	Estimated time per sidereal revolution
Surya Siddhanta	4,332 days, 7 hours, 41 minutes, 44.4 seconds
Ptolemy	4,332 days, 18 hours, 9 minutes, 10.5 seconds
Siddhanta Shiromani	4,332 days, 5 hours, 45 minutes, 43.7 seconds
20th century calculations	4,332 days, 14 hours, 2 minutes, 8.6 seconds

In medieval mythologies particularly those associated with Hindu astrology, Brihaspati has a second meaning and refers to Jupiter. It became the root of the word 'Brihaspativara' or Thursday in the Hindu calendar. Brihaspati as Jupiter is part of the Navagraha in the Hindu zodiac system, considered auspicious and benevolent. The word "Thursday" in the Greco-Roman and other Indo-European calendars is also dedicated to the planet Jupiter (god of sky and thunder). Their zodiac signs being nearly identical.

== Worship ==
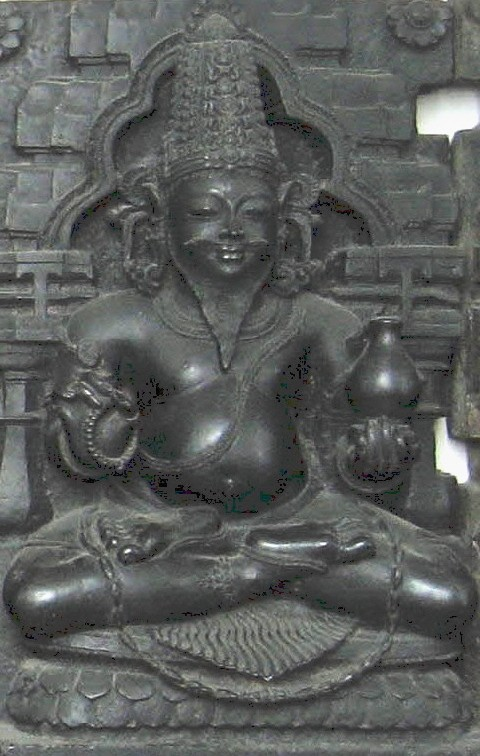
Brihaspati, part of a Navagraha stele from Konark

Jyotisha is Hindu astrology, which entails concept of Nakshatra (see also List of Natchathara temples), Navagraha (see also List of Navagraha temples and Saptarishi included in the list of Hindu deities whose dedicated temples are found at various Hindu pilgrimage sites to which Hindus take pilgrimage yatra. One of the most famous temples of Brihaspati is situated in Tanjore district of Tamil Nadu State.)

== Iconography ==
The icon of Brihaspati makes his body golden, with his legs striped blue and his head covered with a halo of moon and stars. He holds different items depending on the region. In parts of South Asia he holds a container containing soma, sometimes with a tamed tiger. Elsewhere, his icon carries a stick, a lotus and beads. Brihaspati was married to Tara. In some medieval mythologies, Tara was abducted by Chandra with whom she bore a son, Budha (Mercury). Symbol of Jupiter

== Dedicated day ==
Thursday is considered to be the dedicated day for Brihaspati. According to Hindu mythology, praying to Brihaspati on Thursday provides astrological benefits.

== See also ==
- Dyaus Pita
- Navagraha
- Nakshatra
- Jyotisha
- Jupiter (mythology)
- Zeus

== Bibliography ==
- Bhattacharya, Ramakrishna (2011). Studies on the Carvaka/Lokayata (Cultural, Historical and Textual Studies of Religions. Anthem. ISBN 978-0857284334.
- Bhattacharya, Ramakrishna (2002). "Cārvāka Fragments: A New Collection". Journal of Indian Philosophy. 30 (6): 597–640. doi:10.1023/A:1023569009490. S2CID 169948463.
- Pingree, David (1973). "The Mesopotamian Origin of Early Indian Mathematical Astronomy". Journal for the History of Astronomy. 4 (1): 1–12. Bibcode:1973JHA.....4....1P. doi:10.1177/002182867300400102. S2CID 125228353.
- Pingree, David (1981). Jyotihśāstra : Astral and Mathematical Literature. Otto Harrassowitz. ISBN 978-3447021654.
- Yukio Ohashi (1999). Johannes Andersen (ed.). Highlights of Astronomy, Volume 11B. Springer Science. ISBN 978-0-7923-5556-4.
- Bali, Saraswati (1978). Bṛhaspati in the Vedas and the Purāṇas. Delhi: Nag Publishers.
- Parpola, Asko (3 July 2015). The Roots of Hinduism: The Early Aryans and the Indus Civilization. Oxford University Press. pp. 111–114. ISBN 978-0-19-022693-0.
- Radhakrishnan, Sarvepalli and Moore, Charles (1957). A Source Book in Indian Philosophy. Princeton University Press. ISBN 978-0-691-01958-1.
- Klostermaier, Klaus (1 October 2014). A Concise Encyclopedia of Hinduism. Oneworld Publications. p. 56. ISBN 978-1-78074-672-2.
- Mandagadde Rama Jois (1984). Legal and Constitutional History of India: Ancient legal, judicial, and constitutional system. Universal Law Publishing. ISBN 978-81-7534-206-4.
- Robert Lingat (1973). The Classical Law of India. University of California Press. ISBN 978-0-520-01898-3.
- Patrick Olivelle (1999). Dharmasutras: The Law Codes of Ancient India. Oxford University Press. ISBN 978-0-19-283882-7.
- Patrick Olivelle (2006). Between the Empires: Society in India 300 BCE to 400 CE. Oxford University Press. ISBN 978-0-19-977507-1.
