= Monkey god =

Monkey god may refer to:

- Hanuman, a Hindu deity, also a character in Ramayana Epic
- Sun Wukong (also known as The Monkey King), a Taoist deity, a Buddhist deity and a character in the classical Chinese epic Journey to the West
- Sarugami of Japan, often depicted as evil deities, as in the tales of Shippeitaro
- Howler monkey gods, a patron of the artisans among the Classic Mayas
- La Ciudad Blanca, sometimes referred to as a "City of the Monkey God"
- Babi, or Baba, Egyptian deity of Baboons
- Ngi, Gorilla divinity in Central Africa
- Vrishakapi, energetic monkey mentioned in Rigveda
- Wuzhiqi, supernatural being in Chinese Mythology
- Pha Trelgen Changchup Sempa, a mythical monkey-ancestor of the Tibetan people
