= Presbyterian Church in Cameroon =

- Classification: Protestant
- Orientation: Reformed
- Theology: Calvinist
- Polity: Presbyterian
- Associations: World Council of Churches and World Communion of Reformed Churches
- Region: Cameroon
- Origin: 1957
- Branched from: Basel Mission
- Congregations: 1,540 (2017)
- Members: 2,000,000 (2017)
- Official website: pcconline.org

The Presbyterian Church in Cameroon (PCC) is a Reformed and Presbyterian denomination in Cameroon. It is the largest English-speaking church in the country, a member of the World Communion of Reformed Churches, as well as the World Council of Churches. In addition to its religious activities, the PCC contributes to provision of health and education services in the country. The church was established by the Basel Mission, which started to operate in the country in 1886, taking over from English Baptists, after that Cameroon had come under the protection of Germany. The PCC became autonomous in 1957.

== History ==
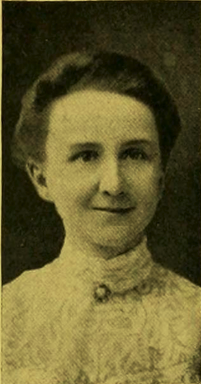
Mrs. C. W. McCleary, Presbyterian missionary in Elat (1907)

The Basel Mission was also active in Cameroon during the 19th century. This Mission established mission stations in Southern Cameroon and Batanga. In 1892 work started among Bulu people. Later the Mission recruited German-speaking missionaries. Stations were opened in Elat, Lolodorf, Metet, Foulassi, Yaoundé, Bafia, Abong Mbang, Batouri and Momjepom. By 1894 the Bible and hymns were translated to the Bulu language.

During the First World War the administration of the German colony of Kamerun passed into British hands and the German and Swiss missionaries were called back. This had a tragic effect on the work of the mission, but a small group of faithful people continued the work, making the church a truly indigenous one. In 1925 European missionaries began returning to the country. The Second World War again disrupted church life, which was however followed by a period of intense activity and growth. The church became autonomous in 1957, at which time there were 69 000 members. Abraham Ebong Ngole was elected as the Synod President. A new constitution was drawn up and adopted, marking the autonomy of the church. It consists of three parts: basic principles, organization, worship and life. PCC is the biggest English-speaking Church in Cameroon, with its headquarters in Buea. The church runs 27 Presbyteries and is estimated to have one million members.

== Statistics ==
Year	Membership
2006	700,000
2010	1,000,000
2016	1,500,000
2017	2,000,000

In 2006, the church had 23 presbyteries, 1,306 congregations, and 700,000 members.

In 2010, it was reported that the denomination had 1,364 congregations and 1 million members.

In 2016, new statistics were released, showing 1.5 million members.

In 2017, it was reported that the church had 2,000,000 members in 1,540 congregations.

== Theology ==
The church adheres to the Apostles Creed, the Westminster Confession of Faith, the Nicene Creed and the Heidelberg Catechism.

== Activities ==
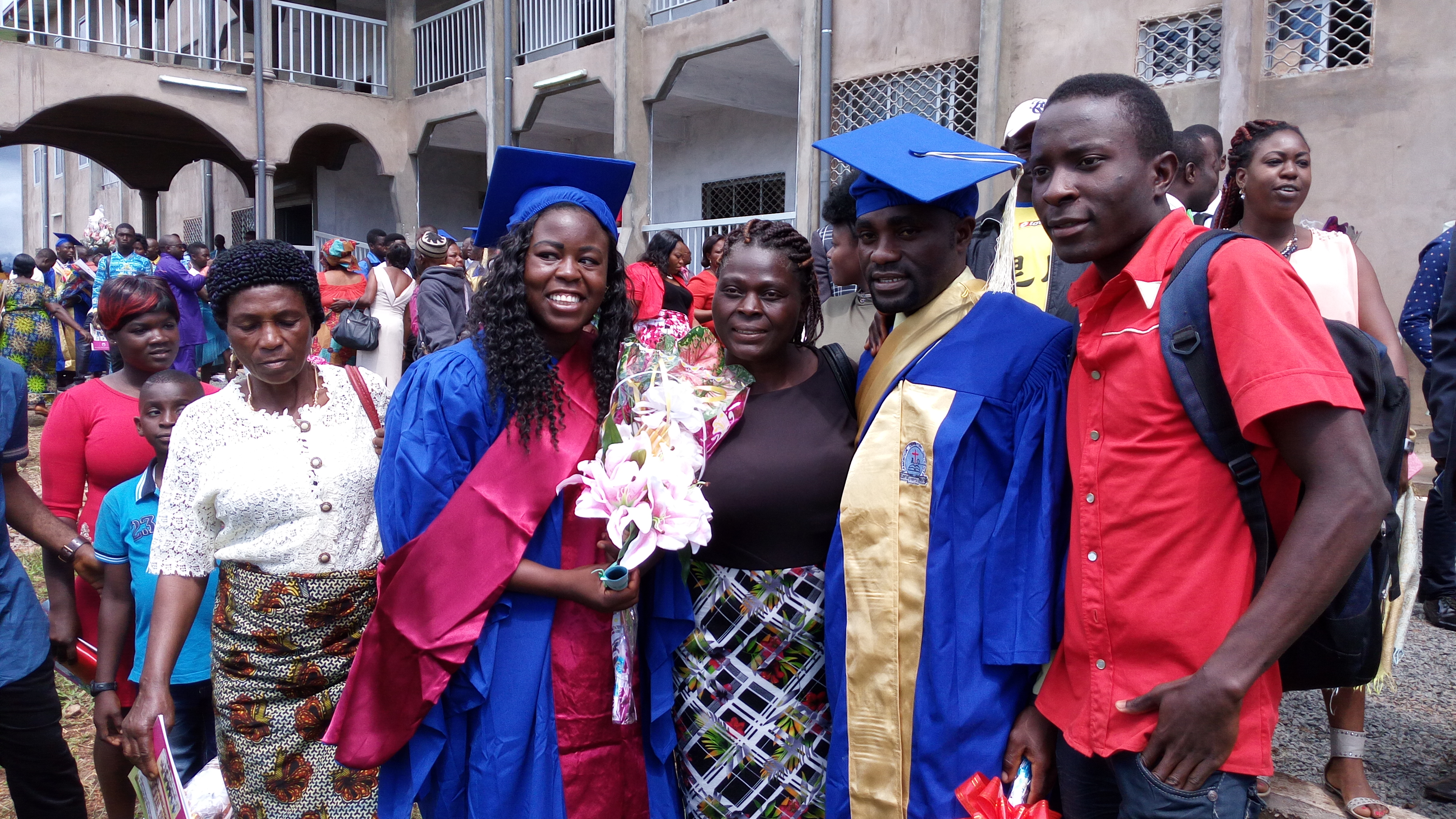
Graduation ceremony at Cameroon Christian University (CCU)

The church missionaries are active in the whole territory of the country. There are parishes in France, Switzerland and in the neighbouring Gabon.

The church runs four general hospitals, a rehabilitation center for leprosy patients, 17 health centres, a central pharmacy and other health facilities. Much emphasis is placed on primary health care in the villages. In the educational field the church has 35 nursery schools, 137 primary schools, 16 secondary or high schools, one technical school and a teacher training college. There is also a centre for agricultural and employment training. The pastors receive their training at the theological seminary in Kumba (66 students in 2004/05). Some are still being trained outside Cameroon, in Africa and overseas. The church had begun a university in 2007 called the Cameroon Christian University, CCU. The church has departments for women, men and youth. The radio and communication department runs its own radio station, the Christian Broadcasting Service in Buea, with branches and reporters all over the nation. It also runs two major church centers in the country, in Bamenda and Kumba with a third soon to be in Douala.

The PCC has joined other Protestant churches in Cameroon to address common issues of an educational, social, political as well as spiritual nature. It supports and promotes the information and eradication of HIV/AIDS and has a very strong policy statement on the issue.

A few years back the PCC celebrated one hundred years of the gospel in the Grassland, in Ntanfoang, Bali, where the first Basel missionaries settled. The church also celebrated its Golden Jubilee in 2007: the Golden Jubilee of its autonomy. The church runs one of the biggest printing presses in the country, has bookshops as one of its evangelical tools and also hostels to help students provide lower rates in university towns.

In 2023, the current Moderator is the Rt. Rev. Fonki Samuel Forba and the Synod Clerk is the Rev. Miki Hans Abia.

== External relations ==
The PCC is a member of the World Communion of Reformed Churches, and has established fraternal relations with the Evangelical Church of Cameroon, the Presbyterian Church (USA), and the Presbyterian Church in Gabon.

== See also ==
- Religion in Cameroon
- Christianity in Cameroon
- Roman Catholicism in Cameroon
- Freedom of religion in Cameroon
