= Sexual dimorphism in Carnivorans =

Differences between male and female animals

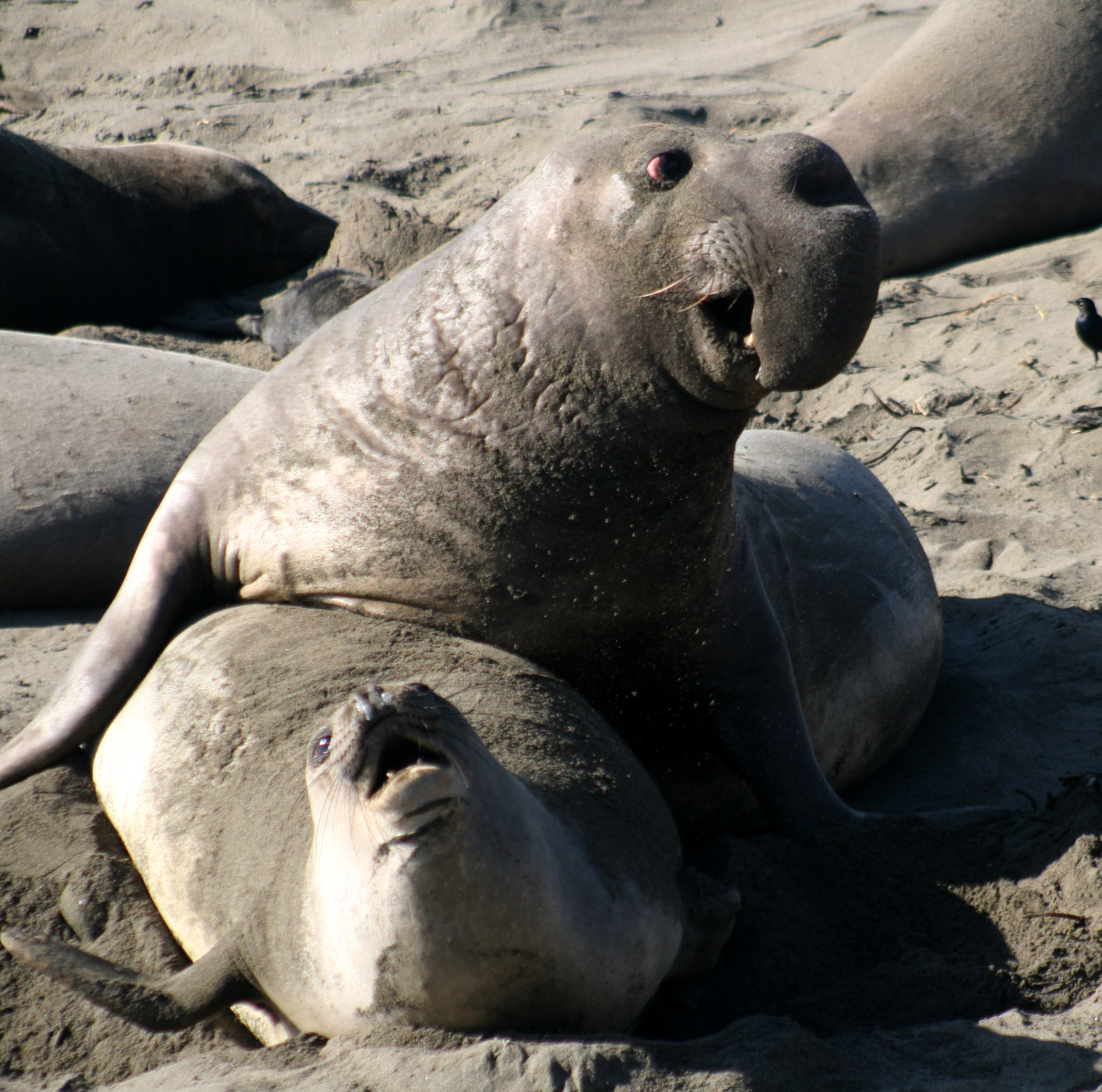
Sexual dimorphism in elephant seals

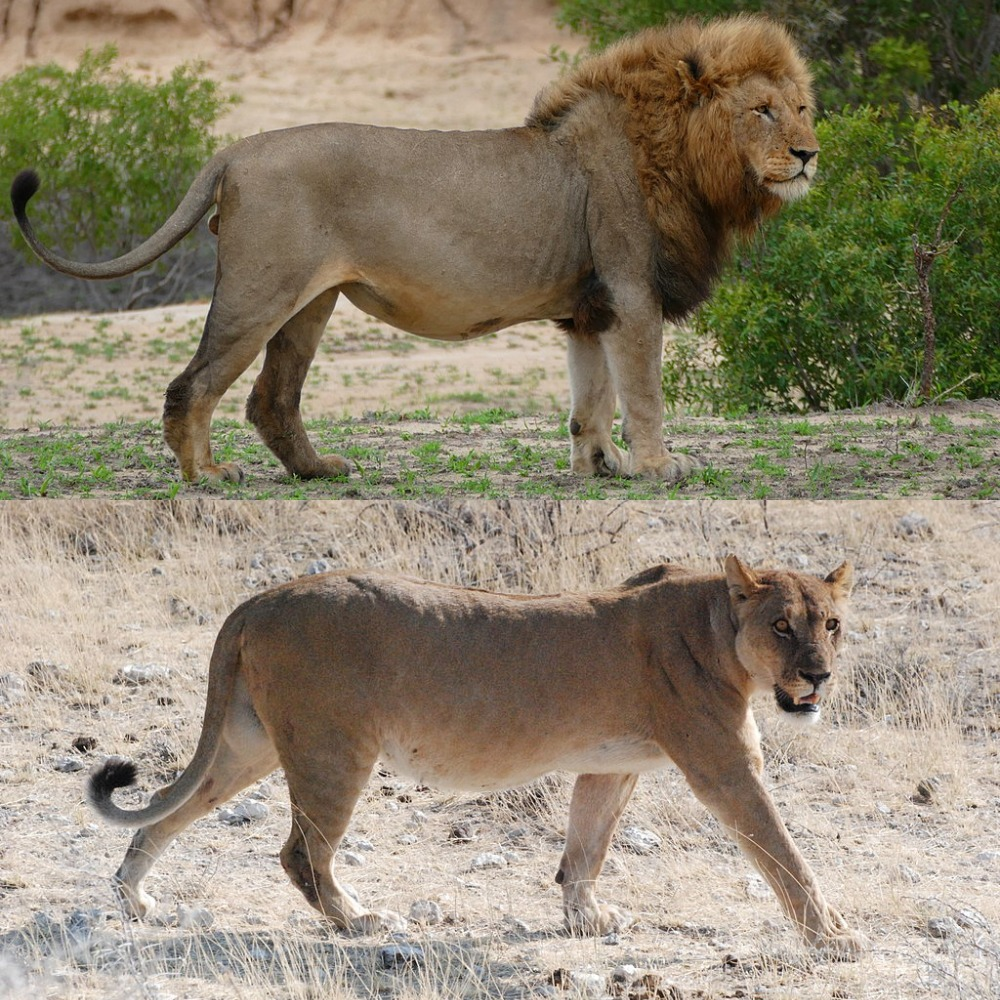
Sexual dimorphism in lions

Sexual dimorphism is the condition where sexes of the same species exhibit different morphological characteristics, particularly characteristics not directly involved in reproduction. Male carnivorans are typically larger than their female counterparts and it is thought that larger males have more success passing on their genes.

== Mechanisms ==
It is believed that in Carnivorans, particularly pinnipeds, male competition for mating opportunities is the primary driver of sexual dimorphism. The notion goes that the larger the male the more success he has passing on his genes. In land-based species where specific males fiercely defend territory and have mating access to multiple females, males are thought to have the largest size advantage over females compared to other Carnivorans.

In a 2019 study, it was suggested that sexual dimorphism in Carnivorans could be effected by prey choice and social behavior. The largest degree of sexual dimorphism was observed in highly carnivorous solitary species. The study also noted that because of males' more powerful, more adapted skulls, and larger home ranges, males have more opportunities to prey on new species. Decreased competition for prey between the sexes could be another factor. These conclusions could explain how sexual dimorphism in Carnivorans persisted through time.

== See also ==
- Sexual dimorphism in non-human primates
- Sexual selection
- Ecological niche
