= Abraham Ebong Ngole =

Cameroonian Presbyterian minister

- Born: 1895; Enyandong, Cameroon
- Died: 1980 (aged 84–85); Kumba, Cameroon
- Occupation: Presbyterian minister
- Known for: First Moderator of the Presbyterian Church in Cameroon

Abraham Ebong Ngole (1895–1980) was a Cameroonian Presbyterian minister and the first Moderator of the Presbyterian Church in Cameroon.

== Biography ==
=== Early life, education, and career beginnings ===
Abraham Ebong Ngole was born in Enyandong in the Bakossi region in 1895. He was entrusted to German missionaries by his father, fearing he would be drafted into the German army during World War I. Upon completing his studies in 1923, he initially worked as a teacher in Besongabang, where he established the primary school of the Basel Mission. In 1930, he became the first Cameroonian teacher and father at the Basel Mission Girls' School in Victoria (now Limbé).

=== Career ===
In 1937, after 13 years of service, Ngole relocated to Tombel, where he became an evangelist and served as a tutor, receiving catechist training at the Nyasoso Catechist Training Institution, which he completed in 1945. He then moved to Itoki among the Bakundu, where he built a Presbyterian community and later received ordination. He was appointed pastor in 1946 and served in Itoki, where he was ordained in 1947.

In 1950, he was transferred to Dikome as pastor and superintendent. When the Cameroonian church became independent from the Basel Mission in 1957, Ngole served as worship moderator. For 12 years, he ensured congregations were composed of Cameroonians, organized youth work, founded the Christian Women's Fellowship in 1961, and began missionary work in Akwaya in 1963.

In 1958, immediately after the independence of the PCC (Presbyterian Cameroon Church), he was elected as the Synod President, subsequently renamed Moderator. He held the highest office in the church for ten years but could not be re-elected due to repeated illnesses.

=== Reputation ===
As the first Moderator of the independent church, he played a significant role in managing church assets. Under Ngole's administration, people were strictly instructed not to use company vehicles and phones, "because the Church is suffering". He demanded detailed accountability for all financial matters, which he also expected from other pastors. His daughter confirmed that he taught this to his children as well.

During his tenure as pastor and superintendent in Dikome, Abraham Ngole diligently followed what he expected from others.

Abraham Ngole fell seriously ill and had to go to the hospital for treatment. But before leaving, he ensured that the cash registers and records were correct and matched the stock of school books. During his long stay in the hospital, it was rumored that Pastor Ngole had diverted the money entrusted to him. Persistent suspicion led the responsible missionary Scheibler to go to the post to check. In the hospital, Ngole asked his daughter Maria to bring down the boxes from the roof and show them to the missionaries. He found complete and well-kept books, money, and records, restoring Abraham Ngole's reputation as a proper and conscientious administrator.

The episode of the accounts check fits perfectly into this image of "good governance" and shows that Ngole did not prioritize personal prosperity. This is evidenced by the simple and clean house he had built for his retirement, which did not correspond to his rank and status.

== Personal life ==
Ngole retired in 1969 and died in 1980 in Kumba at the age of 85.
