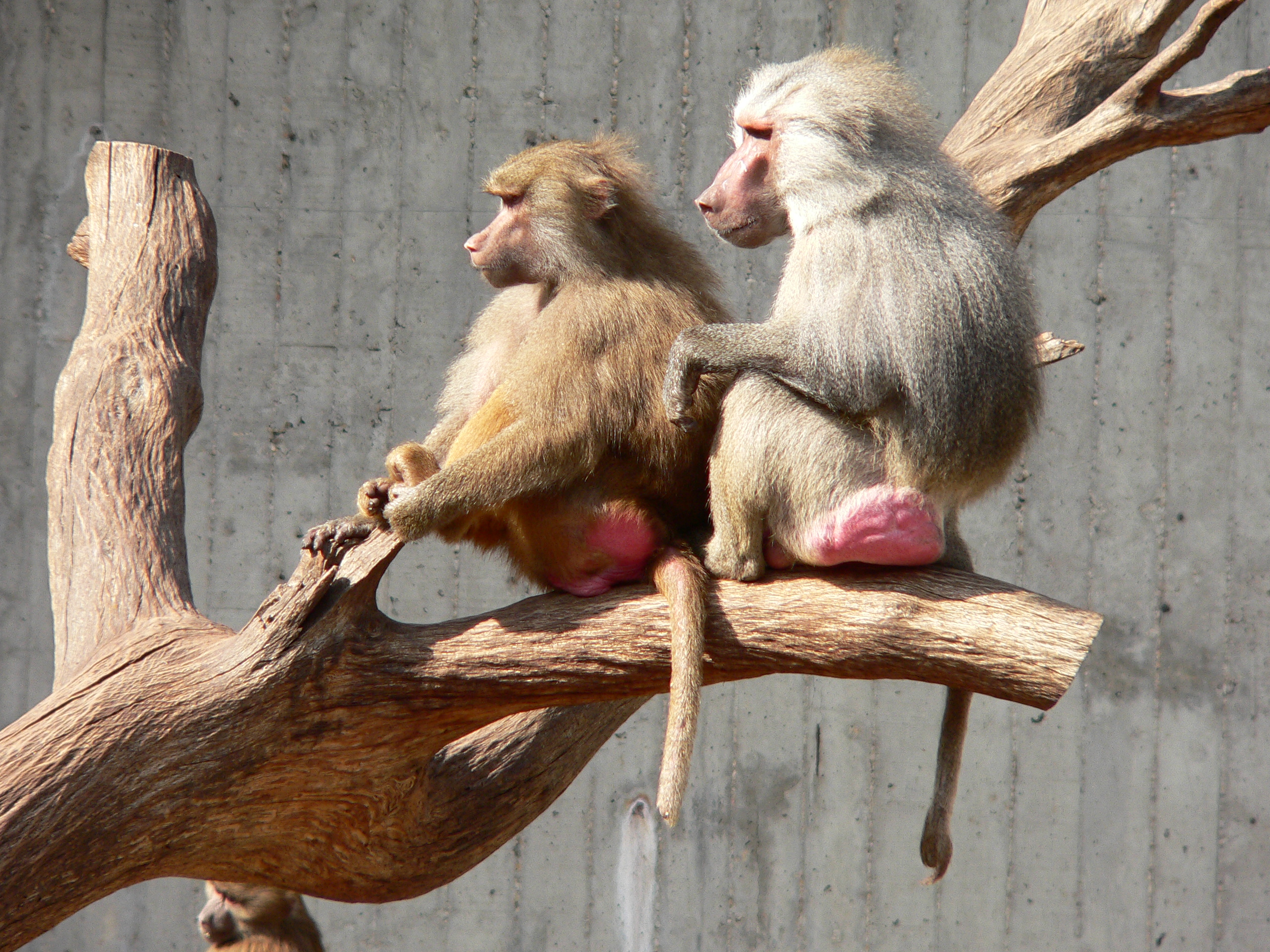
- Female (left) and male (right) at Zoo Aquarium de Madrid

Conservation status
- Least Concern (IUCN 3.1)

Scientific classification
- Kingdom: Animalia
- Phylum: Chordata
- Class: Mammalia
- Order: Primates
- Family: Cercopithecidae
- Genus: Papio
- Species: P. hamadryas

Binomial name
- Papio hamadryas (Linnaeus, 1758)
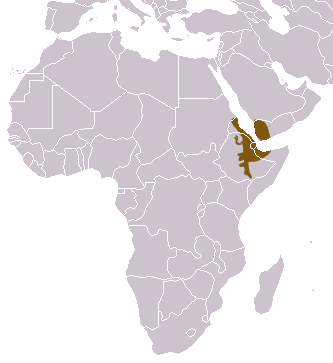

Synonyms
- Simia hamadryas Linnaeus, 1758

= Hamadryas baboon =

Species of baboon

The hamadryas baboon (Papio hamadryas /ˌhæməˈdraɪ.əs/; Tigrinya: ጋውና, romanized: gawina; Arabic: رُبَّاح, romanized: rubbāḥ) is a species of baboon within the Old World monkey family. It is the northernmost of all the baboons, being native to the Horn of Africa and the southwestern region of the Arabian Peninsula. These regions provide habitats with the advantage for this species of fewer natural predators than central or southern Africa where other baboons reside. The hamadryas baboon was a sacred animal to the ancient Egyptians and appears in various roles in ancient Egyptian religion, hence its alternative name of sacred baboon.

== Description ==
The hamadryas baboon shows differences in coloration among adults with males having a pronounced silver-white mane and mantle, which they develop at around the age of ten years, while the females are capeless and brown all over and have reddish to dark brown faces. They are also sexually dimorphic in size, and males are nearly twice as large as females. Males may have a body measurement of up to 80 cm (31 in) and weigh 20–30 kg (44–66 lb); females weigh 10–15 kg (22–33 lb) and have a body length of 40–45 cm (16–18 in). The tail adds a further 40–60 cm (16–24 in) to the length, and ends in a small tuft. Infants are very dark brown or black in coloration and lighten after about one year. Hamadryas baboons reach sexual maturity at about four years for females and between five and seven years for males.

== Behaviour and ecology ==
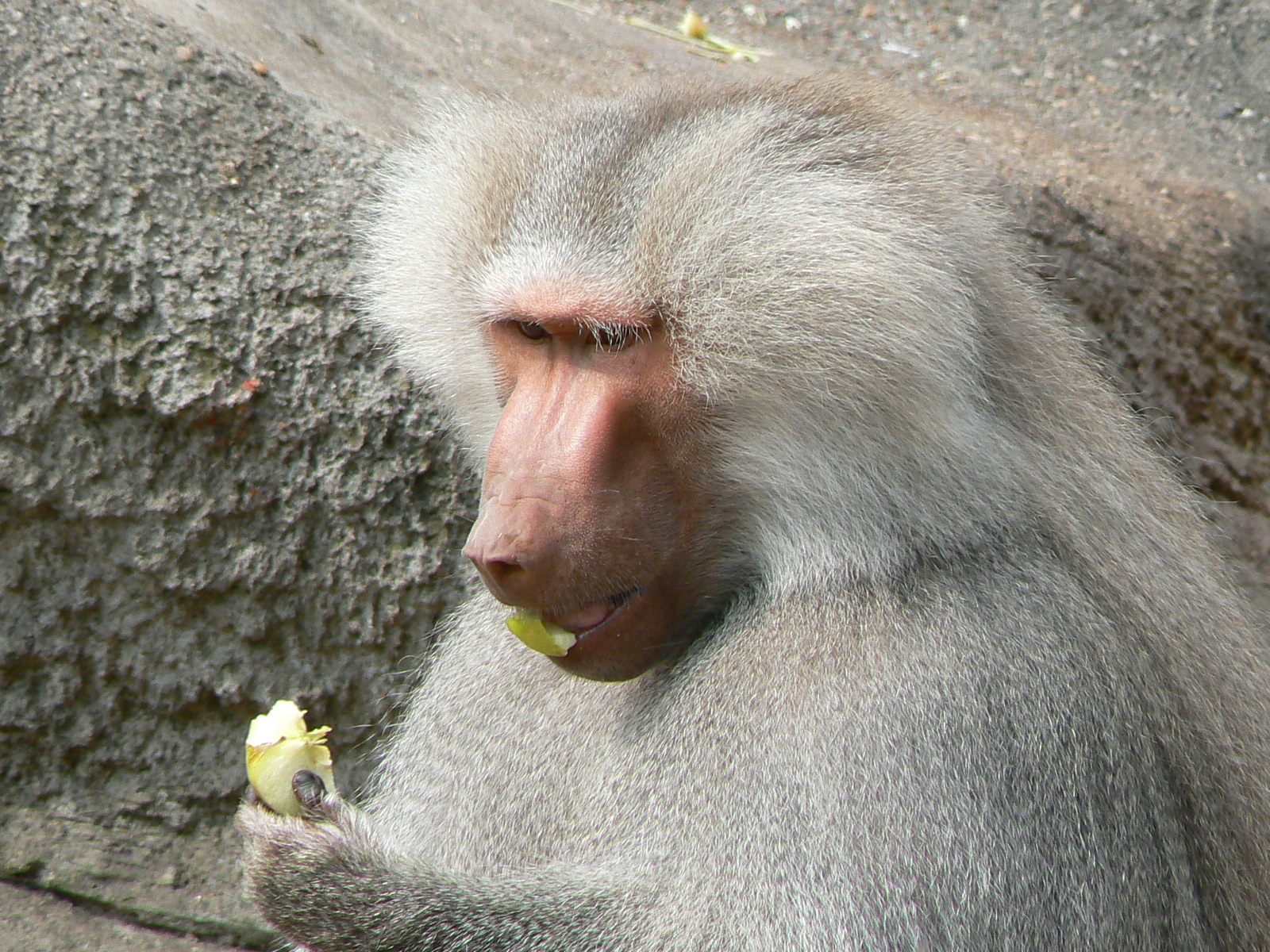
The hamadryas baboon eats fruit in captivity, although it is not a regular part of its diet in the wild.

The hamadryas baboon's range extends from the Red Sea in Eritrea to Ethiopia, Djibouti and Somalia. It is also native to the Sarawat Mountains of southwestern Arabia, in both Yemen and Saudi Arabia. It is locally extinct in Egypt. The hamadryas baboon lives in arid areas, savannas, and rocky areas, requiring cliffs for sleeping and finding water. Like all baboons, the hamadryas baboon is omnivorous and is adapted to its relatively dry habitat. During the wet seasons, the baboon feeds on a variety of foods, including blossoms, fruits, seeds, grasses, rhizomes, corms, wild roots, tubers, bark, tree gums and leaves from acacia trees. During the dry season, the baboons eat leaves of the Dobera glabra and sisal leaves. Hamadryas baboons also eat eggs, insects, spiders, worms, scorpions, reptiles, birds, and small mammals, including antelope.

The baboon's drinking activities also depend on the season. During the wet seasons, the baboon do not have to go far to find pools of water. During the dry seasons, they frequent up to three permanent waterholes. Baboons rest at the waterholes during midafternoon and also dig drinking holes only a short distance from natural waterholes.

=== Group organization ===
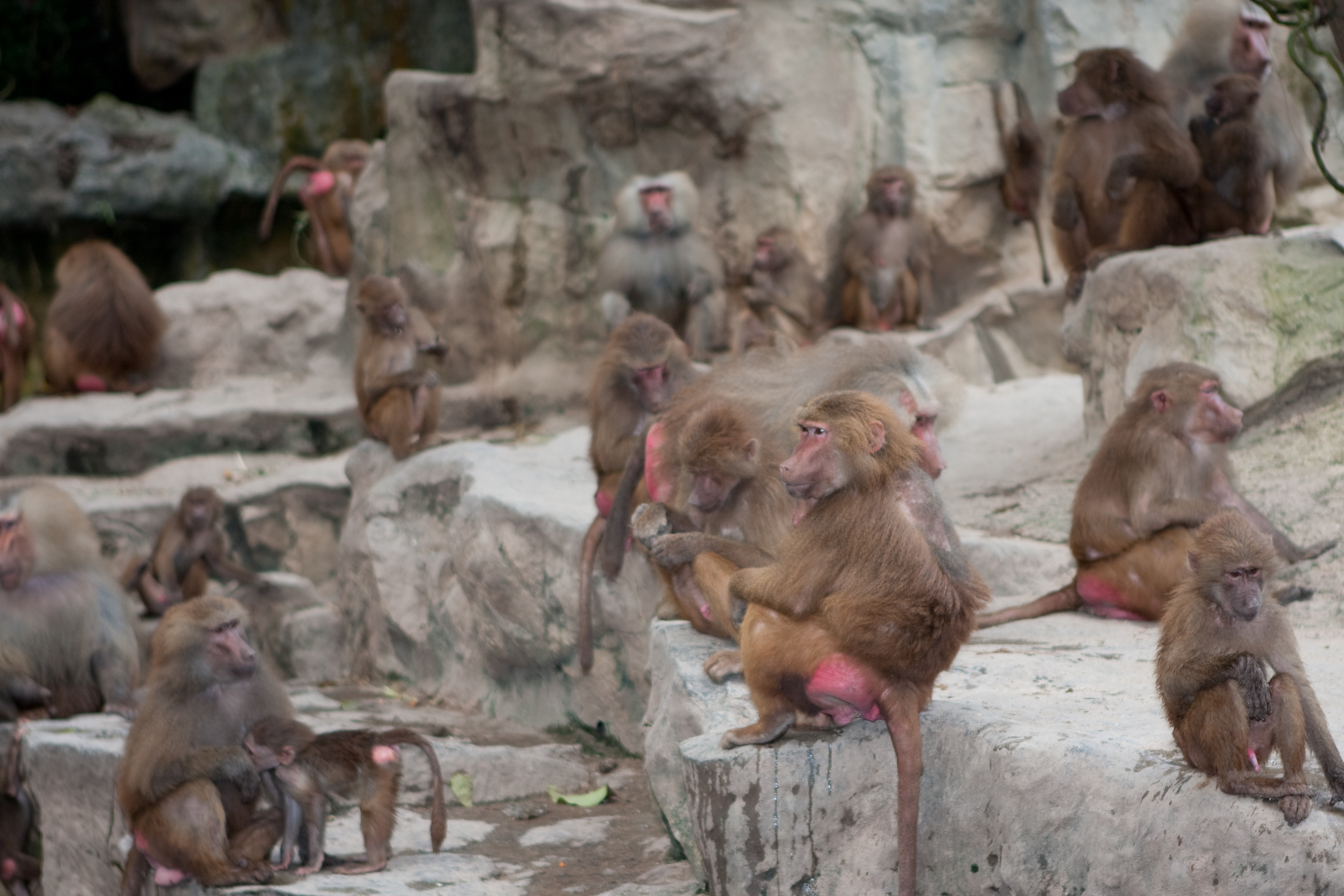
Hamadryas harems together

The hamadryas baboon has an unusual four-level social system called a multilevel society. Most social interaction occurs within small groups called one-male units or harems containing one male and up to 10 females, which the males lead and guard. A harem often includes a younger "follower" male that may be related to the leader. Two or more harems unite repeatedly to form clans. Within clans, males are close relatives of one another and have an age-related dominance hierarchy. Bands are the next level. Two to four clans form bands of up to 400 individuals which usually travel and sleep as a group. Males rarely leave their bands, and females are occasionally transferred or traded between bands by males. Bands may fight with one another over food or territory, and the adult male leaders of the units are the usual combatants. Bands also contain solitary males that are not harem leaders or followers and move freely within the band. Several bands may come together to form a troop, usually at sleeping cliffs.

=== Group behavior ===
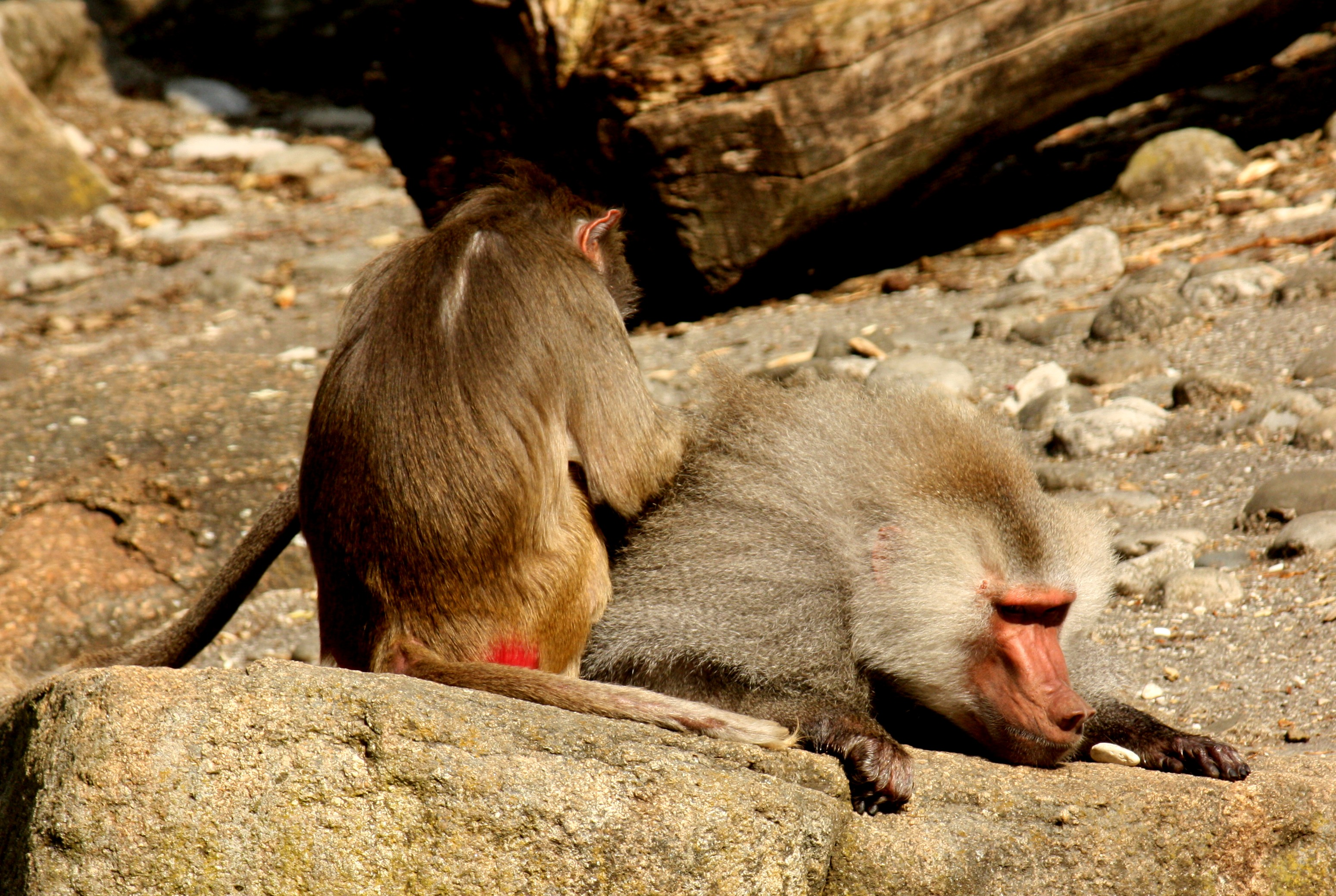
Pair grooming

The hamadryas baboon is unusual among baboon and macaque species in that its society is strictly patriarchal. The males limit the movements of the females, herding them with visual threats and grabbing or biting any that wander too far away. Males sometimes raid harems for females, resulting in aggressive fights. Many males succeed in taking a female from another's harem, called a "takeover". Visual threats are usually accompanied by these aggressive fights. This would include a quick flashing of the eyelids accompanied by a yawn to show off the teeth. As in many species, infant baboons are taken by the males as hostages during fights. However, males within the same clan tend to be related and respect the social bonds of their kin. In addition, females demonstrate definite preferences for certain males, and rival males heed these preferences. The less a female favors her harem males, the more likely she will be successfully taken by a rival. Young males, often "follower" males, may start their own harems by maneuvering immature females into following them. The male may also abduct a young female by force. Either way, the male will mate with the female when she matures. Aging males often lose their females to followers and soon lose weight and their hair color changes to brown like a female. While males in most other baboon species are transferred away from their male relatives and into different troops, male hamadryas baboons remain in their natal clans or bands and have associations with their male kin.

Hamadryas baboons have traditionally been thought of having a female transfer society with females being moved away from their relatives of the same sex. However, later studies show female baboons retain close associations with at least some female kin. Females can spend about as much time with other females as they do with the harem males, and some females will even interact with each other outside of their harems. In addition, it is not uncommon for females of the same natal group to end up in the same harem. Females can still associate and help their extended families despite their interactions being controlled by the harem males.

Females within a harem do not display any dominance relationships as seen in many other baboon and macaque species. The harem males suppress aggression between the females and prevent any dominance hierarchies from arising. Despite this, some social differences between the females occur. Some females are more socially active and have a stronger social bond with the harem male. These females, known as the "central females", stay in closer proximity to the harem male than the other females. Females that spend most of their time farther from the harem male are called "peripheral females".

=== Reproduction and parenting ===
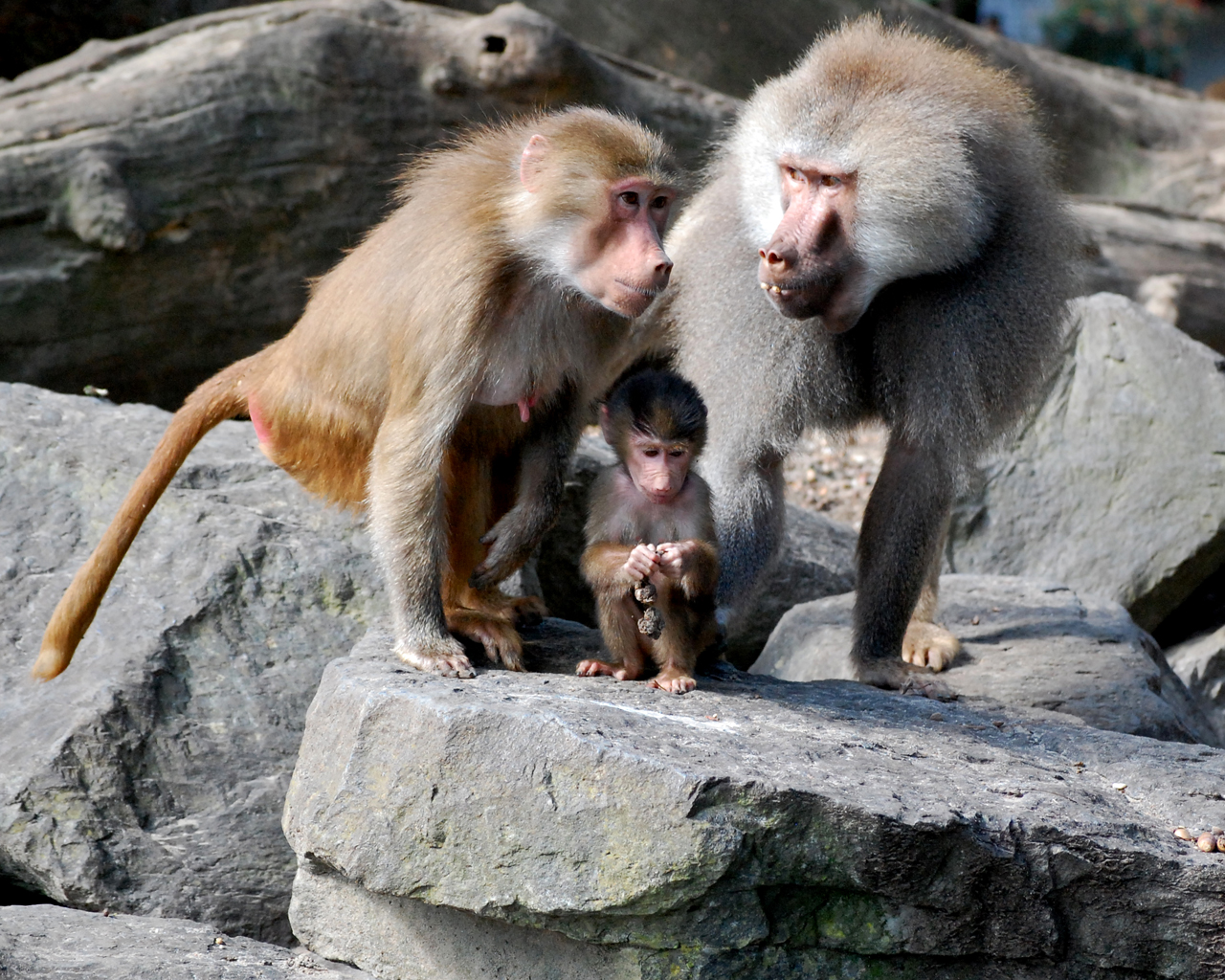
Male, female and infant

Like other baboons, the hamadryas baboon breeds aseasonally. The dominant male of a one-male unit does most of the mating, though other males may occasionally sneak in copulations, as well. Females do most of the parenting. They nurse and groom the infant and one female in a unit may groom an infant that is not hers. Like all baboons, hamadryas baboons are intrigued by infants and give much attention to them. Dominant male baboons prevent other males from coming into close contact with their infants. They also protect the young from predators. The dominant male tolerates the young and will carry and play with them. When a new male takes over a female, she develops sexual swellings which may be an adaptation that functions to prevent the new male from killing the offspring of the previous male. When males reach puberty, they show a playful interest in young infants. They will kidnap the infants by luring them away from their harems and inviting them to ride on their backs. This is more often done by "follower" males. This kidnapping can lead to dehydration or starvation for the infant. The harem leader would retrieve the infants from their kidnappers, which is mostly an act to protect their offspring.

=== Thermoregulation ===
Because bipedalism is thought to help reduce thermoregulatory stress, research has investigated how baboons deal with water restriction and thermal loads as quadrupeds. Using implanted data loggers and simulated desert conditions, researchers found baboon internal temperatures increased significantly with water deprivation. When water was given to baboons, their internal temperatures dropped quickly. Therefore, it seems that access to water helps baboons maintain homeothermy and that water restrictions are a major threat to this species. However, baboons can maintain their plasma volume during water deprivation due to an increase in blood colloid osmotic pressure (COP). Hamadryas baboons do this by increasing albumin synthesis. This helps baboons retain fluids when their bodies are experiencing dehydration.

== In culture ==
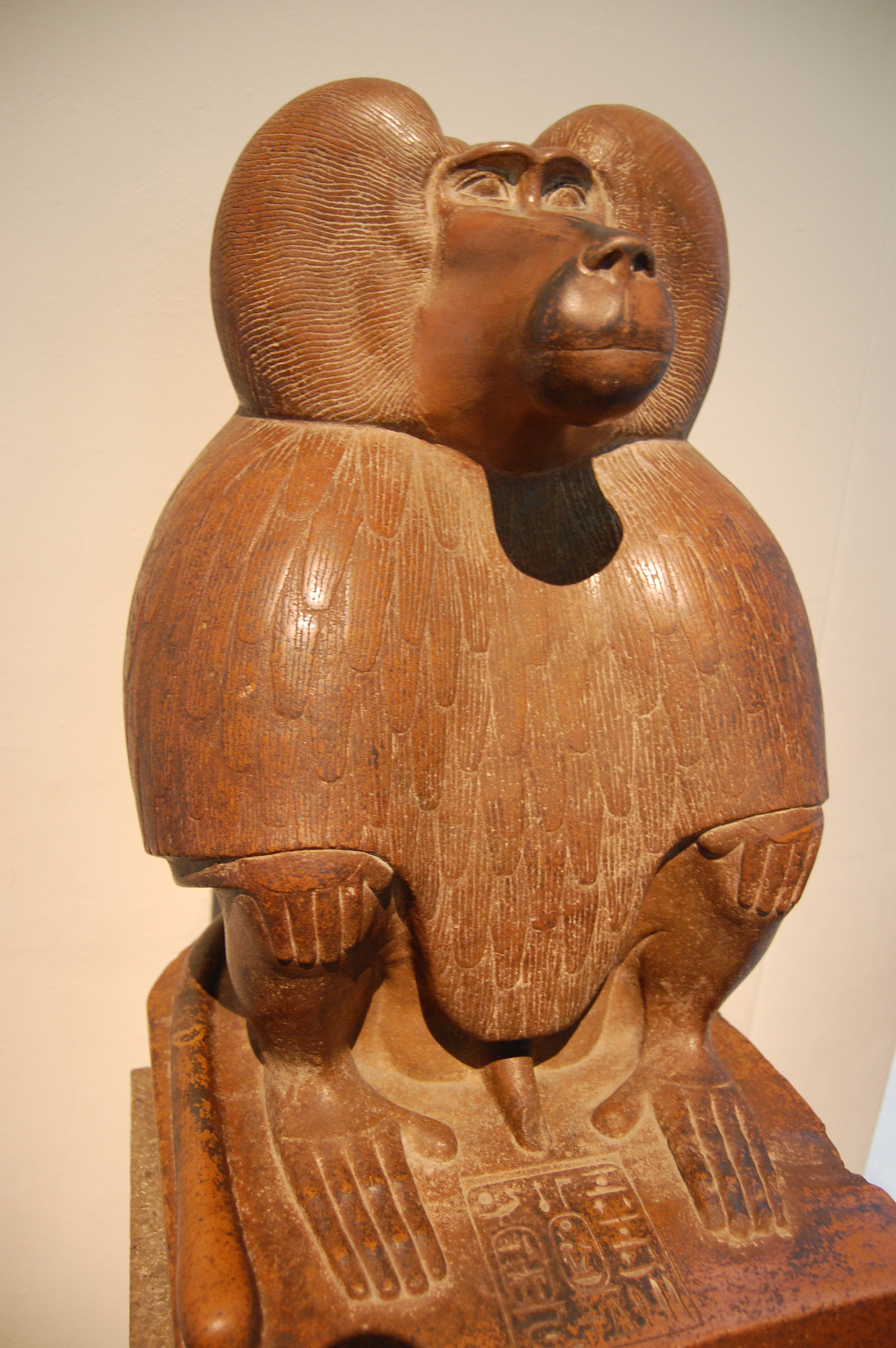
Depiction of a hamadryas baboon as the god Thoth (c. 1400 BC), in the British Museum

Hamadryas baboons often appear in ancient Egyptian art, as they were considered sacred to Thoth, a major and powerful deity with many roles that included being the scribe of the gods. Astennu, attendant to Thoth, is represented as a hamadryas in his roles as recorder of the result of the Weighing of the Heart and as one of the four hamadryas baboons guarding the lake of fire in Duat, the ancient Egyptian underworld. A predynastic precursor to Astennu was Babi, or "Bull of the Baboons", a bloodthirsty god said to eat the entrails of the unrighteous dead. Babi was also said to give the righteous dead continued virility, and to use his penis as the mast of a boat to convey them to the Egyptian paradise.

Sometimes, Thoth himself appears in the form of a hamadryas (often shown carrying the moon on his head), as an alternative to his more common representation as an ibis-headed figure. Hapi, one of the Four Sons of Horus that guarded the organs of the deceased in ancient Egyptian religion, is also represented as hamadryas-headed; Hapi protected the lungs, hence the common sculpting of a stone or clay hamadryas head as the lid of the canopic jar that held the lungs and/or represented the protection of the lungs. Hamadryas baboons were revered because certain behaviors that they perform were seen as worshiping the sun.

=== Modern art ===
The Grand Babouin sacré "hamadryas" is among Rembrandt Bugatti's most celebrated sculptures.

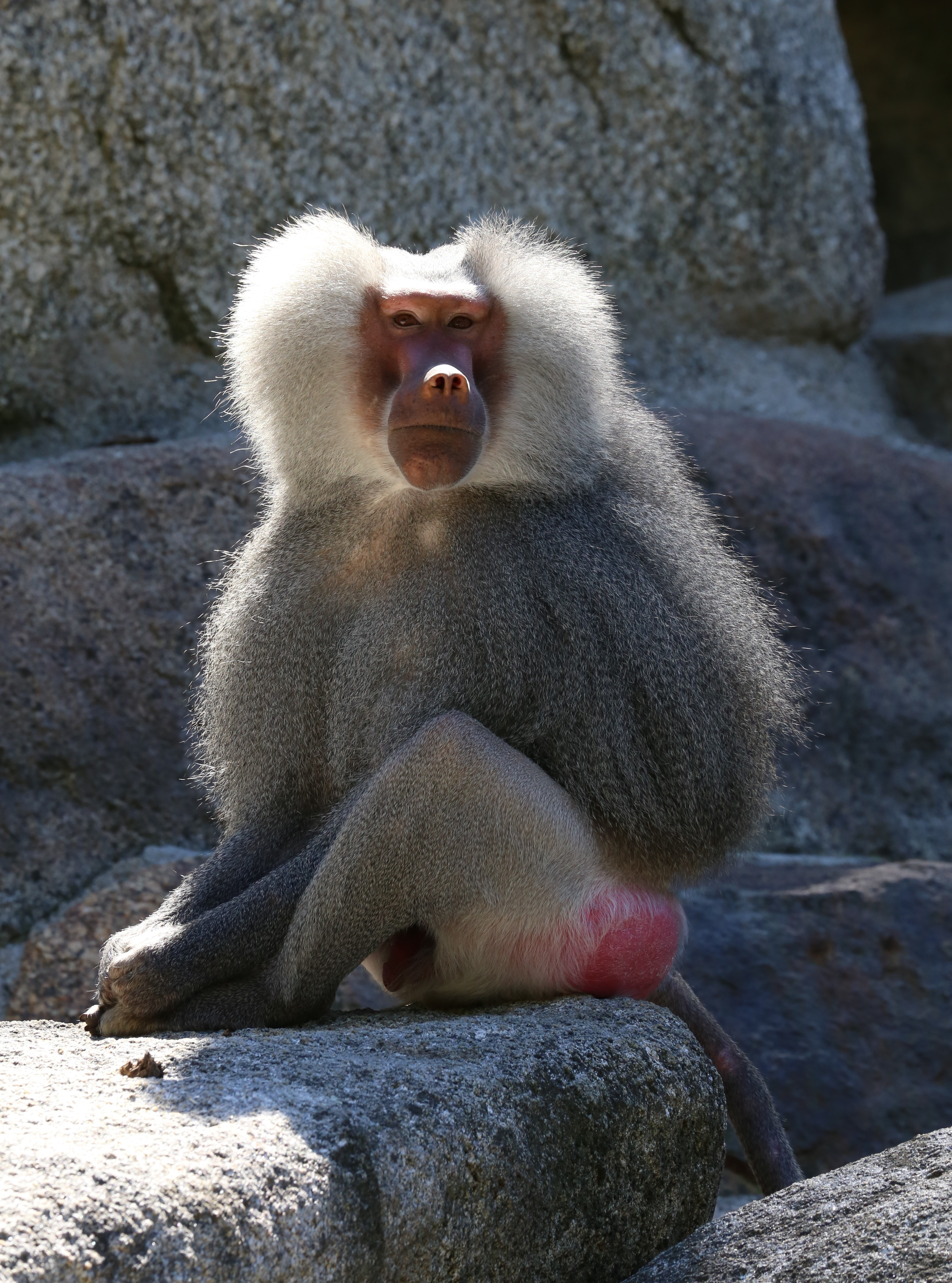
Captive male at Tierpark Hellabrunn, Germany

== Threats and conservation ==
Transformation of field and pastureland represents the main threat to the hamadryas baboon; its only natural predators are the striped hyena, spotted hyena, and a diminishing number of African leopards that can still be found in the same area of distribution. Grey wolves are predators of Hamadryas baboons in Saudi Arabia. The IUCN Red List listed this species as "least concern" in 2008. No major range-wide threats exist at present, although locally it may be at risk through loss of habitat due to major agricultural expansion and irrigation projects. The species occurs in the proposed Yangudi Rassa National Park, the Harar Wildlife Sanctuary, and a number of wildlife reserves in the lower Awash valley and in northern Eritrea.
