= Indrani =

Consort of Indra in Hindu mythology

- Queen of the Devas
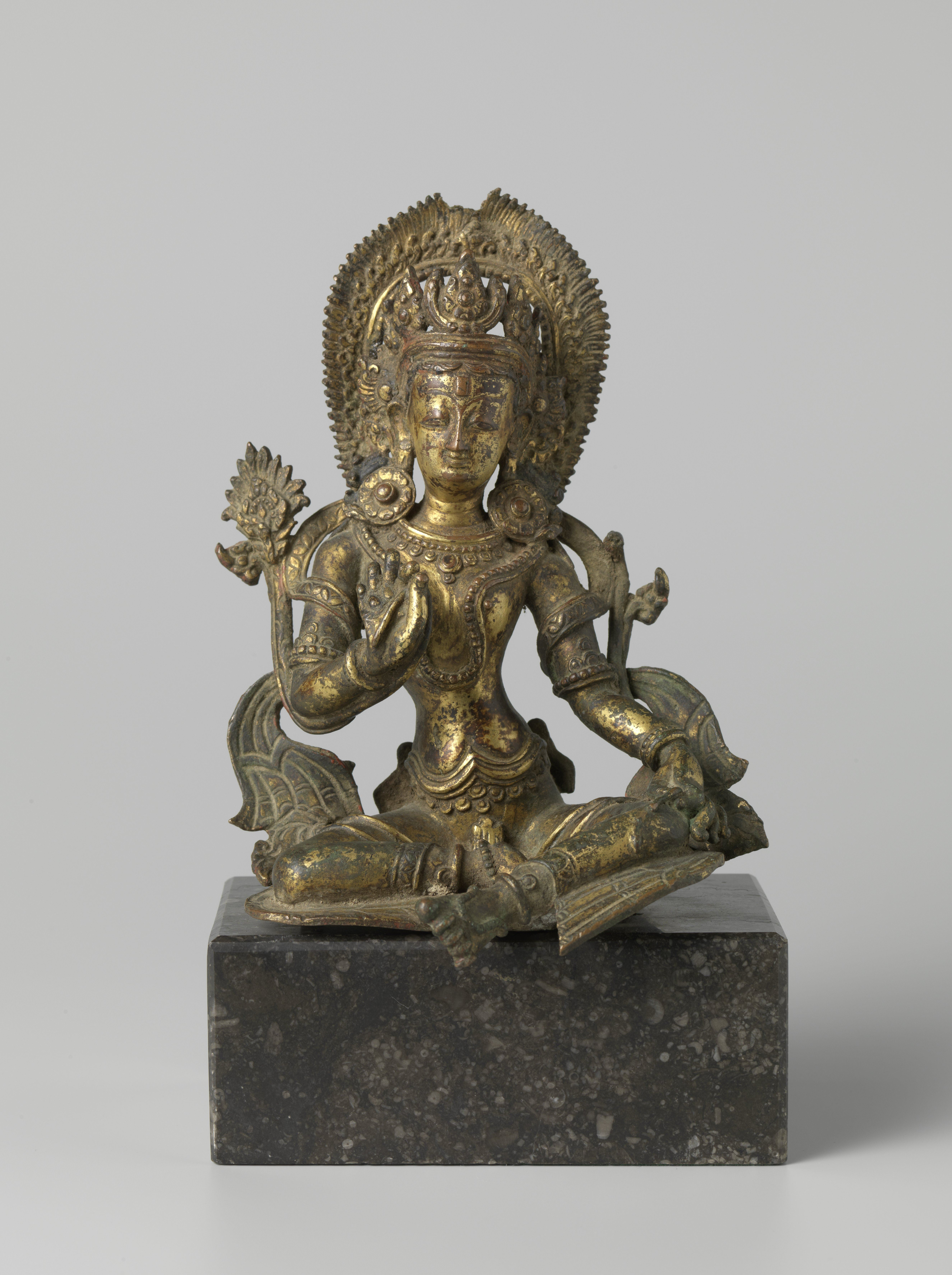
- c. 1500–1600 Indrani from Nepal, depicted as consort of Indra
- Other names: Shachi, Poulomi, Aindri
- Affiliation: Devi, Shakti
- Abode: Amaravati, Indraloka, Svarga
- Mantra: ॐ ऐन्द्री नम:
- Weapon: Vajra, Astras, Trishula
- Day: Sunday
- Mount: Airavata
- Gender: Female
- Festivals: Navaratri

Genealogy
- Parents: Puloman (father)
- Consort: Indra
- Children: Jayanta, Rishabha, Midhusha, Jayanti, Devasena (Shashthi)

Indrani (Sanskrit: इन्द्राणी, IAST: Indrāṇī), also known as Shachi (Sanskrit: शची, IAST: Śacī) and Paulomi (Sanskrit: पौलोमी, IAST: Paulomī), is the queen of the devas in Hinduism. Described as tantalisingly beautiful, proud and kind, she is the daughter of the asura Puloman and the consort of the king of the devas, Indra.

According to legend, due to her heavenly beauty and sensuality, Indrani was desired by many men, many of whom tried to marry her. When Indra was away performing his penance for the slaying of Vritasura, Nahusha, a mortal king of the Lunar dynasty, was chosen as the ruler of the heaven. The latter tried to seduce Shachi and make her his queen, though she cleverly executed a scheme to dethrone him and later reunite with her husband.

Indrani (or Aindri) is also one of the Sapta Matrikas—the seven divine mothers. She is an important goddess in Shaktism, a major sect of Hinduism. Indrani is rarely worshipped as an independent deity and is most often worshipped with Indra throughout India. She is also a goddess in Jainism and Buddhism, mentioned in their texts.

== Etymology and epithets ==
Like many Vedic goddess-consorts whose names are derived from their husband's name by adding a feminine termination, the word Indrani (Indrāṇī) is derived from Indra and means 'wife of Indra'. Importantly, however, Indra is known by his wife's name as well; he is often referred to as Shachipati (husband of Shachi), Shachindra (Shachi's Indra), Sachin (belonging to Shachi), or Shachivat (possessor of Shachi).

Shachi (Śacī) is a prominent other name of Indrani. The term finds usage in the Vedas with dual significance: firstly, as the proper name for Indrani and secondly, as a generic expression denoting the strength inherent in the divine entities, particularly associated with Indra. According to Sir Monier Monier-Williams, 'Shachi' means 'speech', 'power of speech', or 'eloquence'. It is derived from the Sanskrit word shach, which means 'speak', 'say' or 'tell'. Shachi is also associated with the word shak, meaning 'power', 'strength', 'action' or 'exploit'. David Kinsley, a professor known for his research on Hindu goddesses, believed that the word Shachi is suggestive of the later concept of Shakti, the personification of power. Other scholars use 'divine grace' as the translation of Shachi. Other names include:

- Aindri (Aindrī) – 'wife of Indra'
- Poulomi (Poulomī) – 'daughter of Puloman'
- Poulomuja (Poulomujā) – 'daughter of Puloman'
- Devarani (Devarāṇī) – 'queen of devas'
- Charudhara (Cārudhārā) – 'beautiful'
- Shakrani (Śakrāṇī) – 'wife of Shakra (Indra)'
- Mahendrani (Mahendrāṇī) – 'wife of Mahendra (Indra)'

== In Hindu literature ==
=== Vedic ===
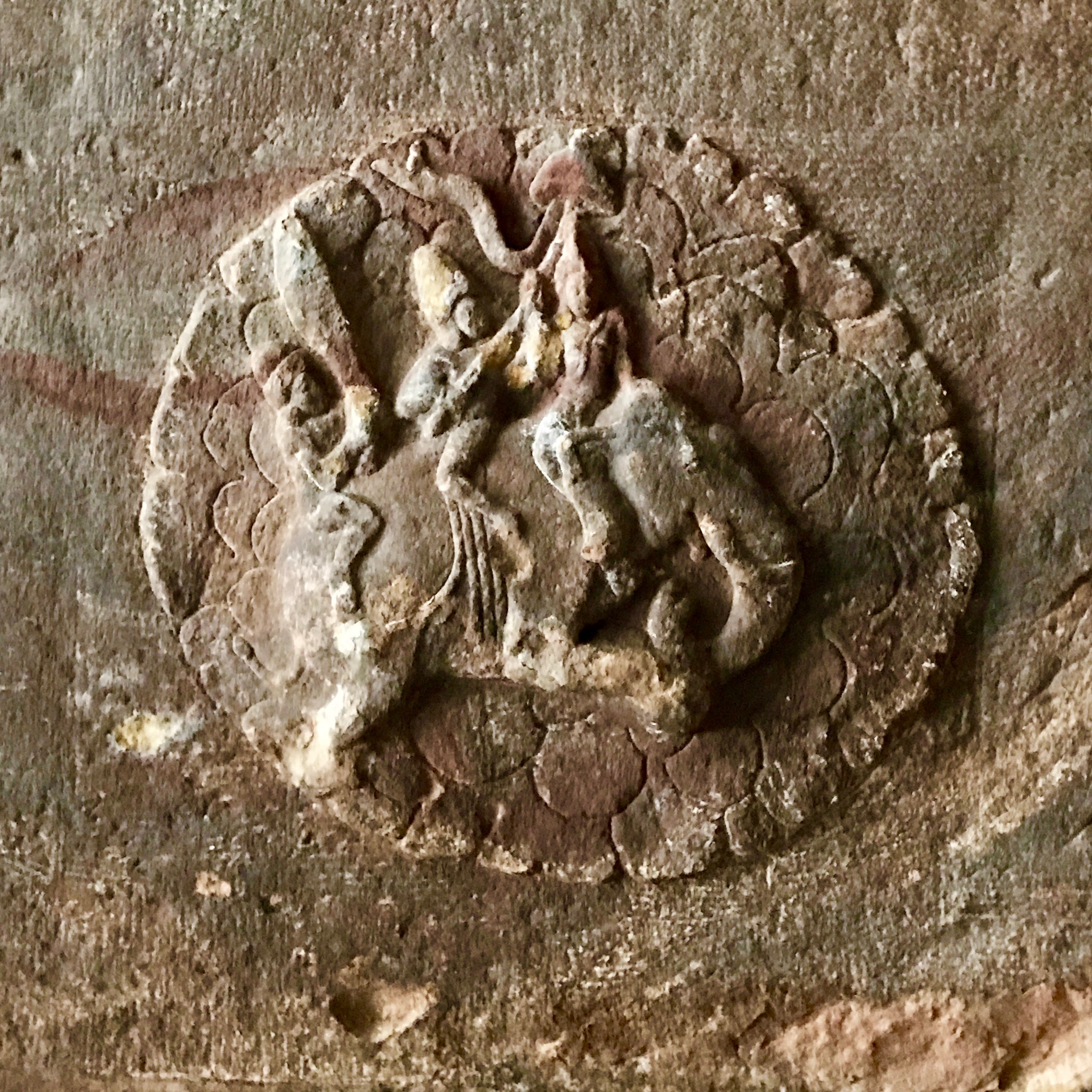
Indra, Indrani, and Airavata in a 6th-century cave temple in Badami, Karnataka

Indrani first appears in the Rigveda, which was composed in the early second millennium BCE. According to some scholars, unlike many Vedic deities who personify natural phenomena, Indrani does not have a myth of nature that explains her existence and may have originated as Indra's wife. However, one Rigvedic hymn (10.159) addressed Indrani as Śacī Poulomī and presented her as the "deification" of Indra's power. In this context, the term Śacī meant "the rendering of powerful or mighty help, assistance, aid, especially of the 'deeds of Indra'." This use of the term Śacī is seen as a major step in the later conception of Śakti as the divine power that is separate from a deity, but something not inherently present within it.

In the Rigveda, Indrani is invoked multiple times and is mentioned with other goddesses in the first three of these passages. Another hymn considers her to be the most fortunate female, as her husband Indra cannot die from old age. David Kinsley states that many of the goddesses in the early texts are named after their husbands and have no independent character of their own. While Indrani is mentioned more often than any other Vedic goddess-consorts, she remains overshadowed by her husband.

Hymn 10.68 of the Rigveda praises her as being very beautiful and mentions her jealousy of rivals. Another hymn (10.159) describes Indrani as being boastful and claiming that she has conquered her husband; he is submissive to her will. Despite this, in the same hymn, Indrani asks the gods to rid her of rivals for Indra's favour. A hymn in Rigveda is dedicated to a quarrel between Indrani and Indra, where she becomes annoyed with the pranks of Vrishakapi—Indra's pet ape—and complains about it.

The Shatapatha Brahmana refers to Indrani as Indra's beloved. The Taittiriya Brahmana suggests that Indra chose Indrani over other goddesses because of her beauty and sensuality. Scholars note that the Aitareya Brahmana mentions Prasaha and Sena as the wives of Indra, but both of them are identified with Indrani.

=== Epic and Puranic ===
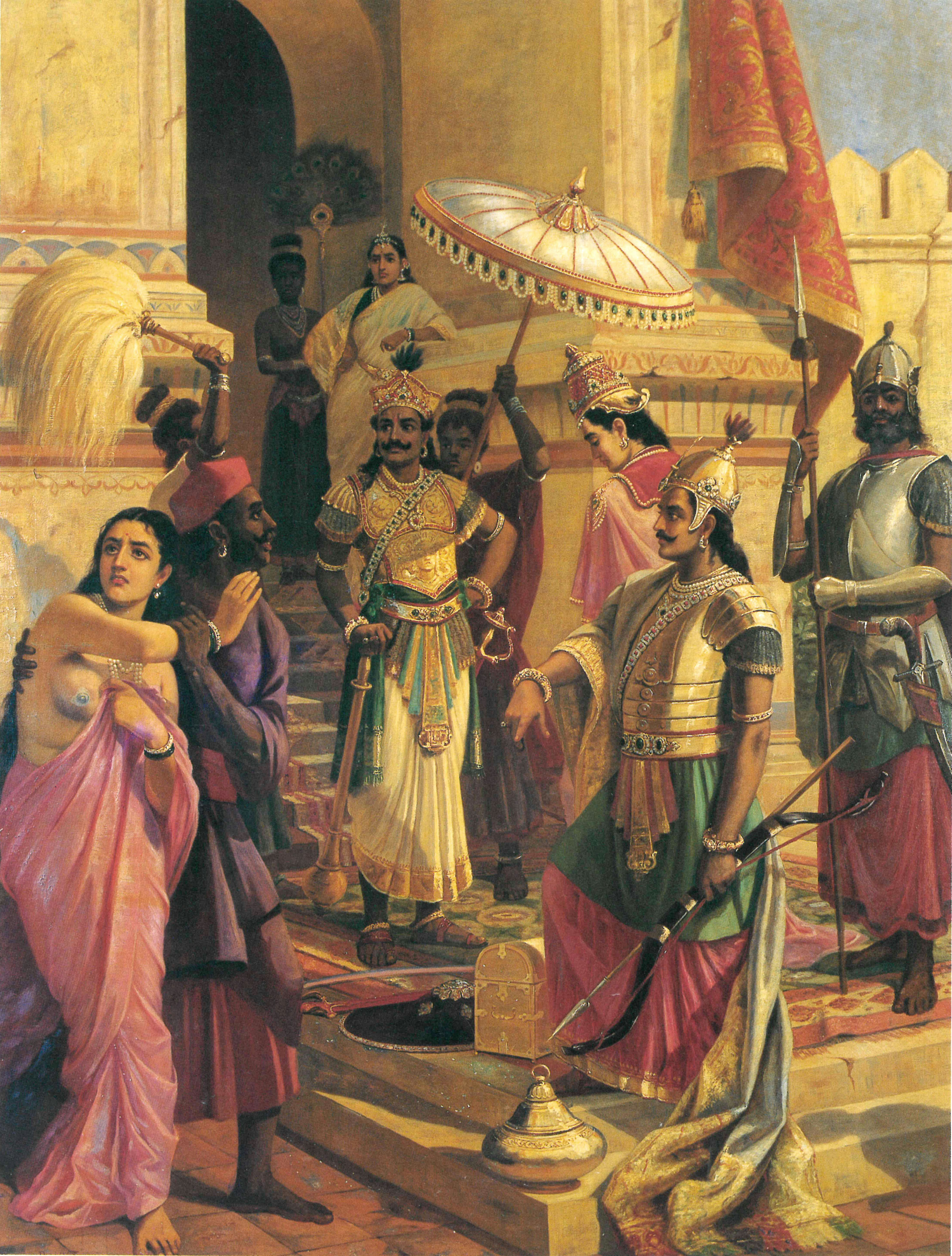
Shachi (Indrani) has been lusted after by various men. In this painting by Raja Ravi Varma, Shachi (far-left) is presented to Ravana after his son Meghnada conquered heaven.

In the later Hindu texts, including the epics Ramayana and Mahabharata, as well as the Puranas, Indrani is more commonly referred to as Shachi, and is the daughter of Puloman, an asura (demonic figure) son of the sage Kashyapa and his wife Danu. She married Indra and became the queen of the devas (gods). The Bhagavata Purana mentions that Indra and Shachi had three sons named Jayanta, Rishabha, and Midhusha; some other texts include Nilambara and Ribhus. Indra and Shachi had a daughter named Jayanti, who married Indra's rival Shukra. In some scriptures, Indra and Shachi bestowed their daughter Devasena to Kartikeya.

Author James G. Lochtefeld comments that Shachi is not a major figure, and this may reflect Indra's diminished status in later Hindu mythology. He claims that Shachi's only important role is in the story of Nahusha. In the story, according to the Mahabharata, Indra once committed Brahmahatya (Brahminicide) by killing Vritra, after which he set out incognito to perform a penance. During this period, the devas appointed Nahusha, a powerful mortal ruler of the Lunar dynasty, to be the king of heaven. He soon became proud of his power and desired Shachi, but she refused his amorous advances and sought protection under Brihaspati, Indra's teacher. Angered by Nahusha's illicit behaviour, the devas advised her to bring back Indra, and after crafting a plan, Shachi went to Nahusha. She told Nahusha that before accepting him, he would have to wait until Indra was found; Nahusha showed his consent. Though Indra was found and redeemed from his sin, he refused to return as Nahusha was the king, and went back into hiding. Aided by the goddess Upashruti, Shachi located Indra in the lake Manasarovar. Indra suggested that Shachi scheme to remove Nahusha from his position. She returned to Nahusha and asked him to come to her in a palanquin driven by sages. Due to his impatience and arrogance, Nahusha kicked the sage Agastya while riding in the palanquin. Agastya cursed Nahusha to fall from heaven and transformed him into a snake. Indra was hence restored as the King of Heaven and reunited with Shachi.

According to another story in the Ramayana, Anuhlada, the son of the Daitya Hiranyakashipu, wanted to marry Shachi, but she refused. As a result, he took permission from Puloman to forcefully abduct and marry her. During the abduction, Indra spotted Anuhlada and Shachi and saved his wife by killing both Anuhlada and Puloman. (Note: In contrast, Alain Daniélou writes that Puloman was killed after Indra eloped with Shachi.) The Southern Indian text Kanda Purana narrates that when the asura Surapadman desired Shachi, Indra appointed the god Shasta as her guard. During his absence, Surapadman's sister came to Shachi and unsuccessfully tried to convince her to marry the asura. In the epics, Shachi's beauty and devotion are compared to other women, such as Rohini, Arundhati, Sita, and Draupadi. The Mahabharata also mentions that the heroine Draupadi was Shachi's incarnation, though Draupadi is praised as an incarnation of Sri in other earlier chapters of the text.

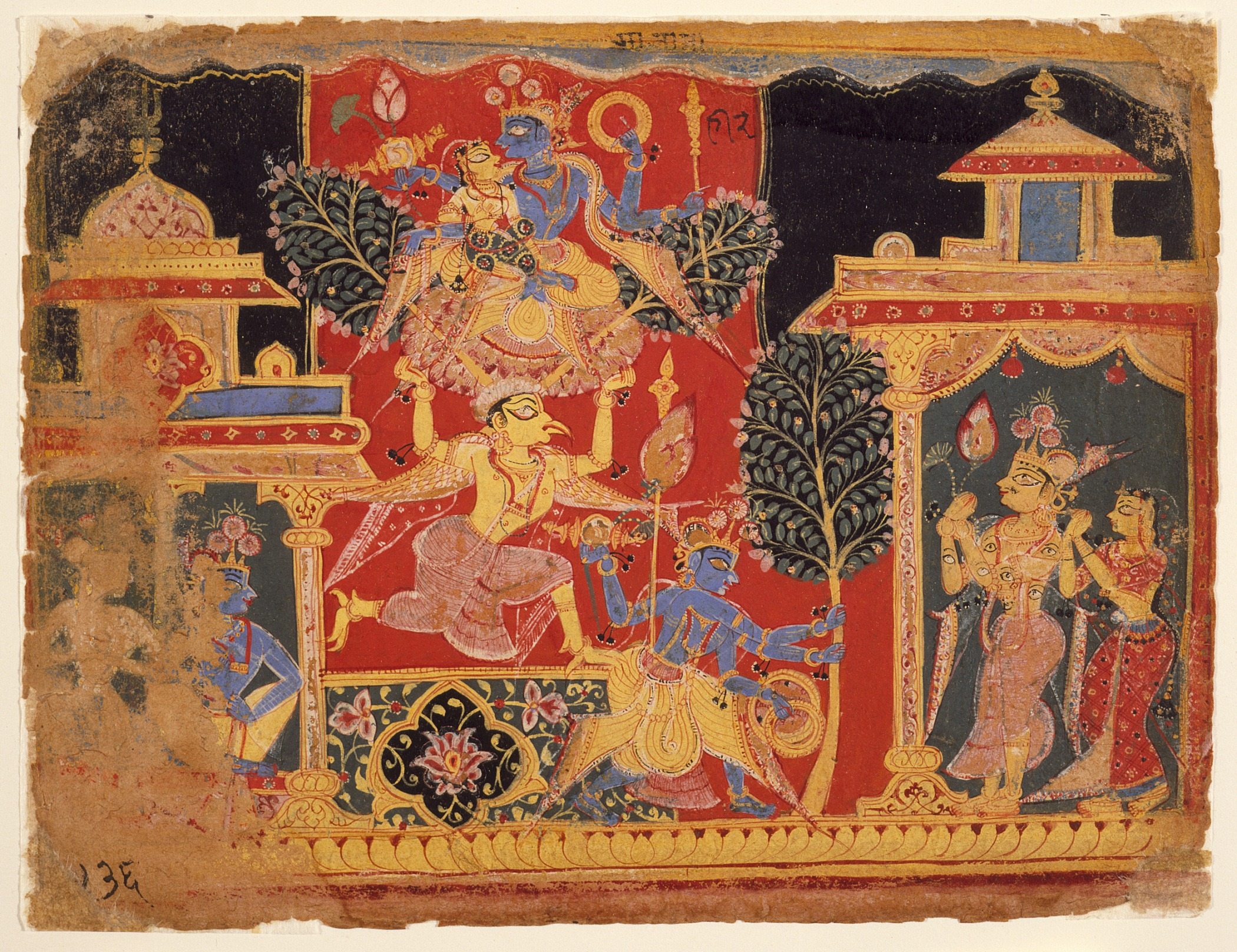
In a folio from the Bhagavata Purana, Krishna uproots the Parijata Tree while Indra and Shachi (Indrani) apologise.

The Puranas attest that Shachi owned the Parijata tree (Nyctanthes arbor-tristis), which was one of the jewels emerging from the Samudra Manthan (the churning of the ocean). In the Vishnu Purana and Bhagavata Purana, the god Krishna and his wife Satyabhama visited Amaravati to return the earrings of Indra's mother Aditi, which were stolen by the demon Narakasura. Shachi considered Satyabhama to be inferior because of her mortal background and while introducing the latter to Aditi, she didn't treat her properly. Later, while travelling through Indra's garden, Satyabhama saw the Parijata tree and decided to transplant it to Dvaraka. When Shachi's guards warned Satyabhama, she challenged Shachi to ask Indra to protect the tree if he was truly submissive to her will. After hearing about Satyabhama's words from a guard, Shachi insisted that her husband take back her possession. A battle between Indra and Krishna occurred, in which the latter was victorious and took the tree with him.

==== Association with the Matrikas ====
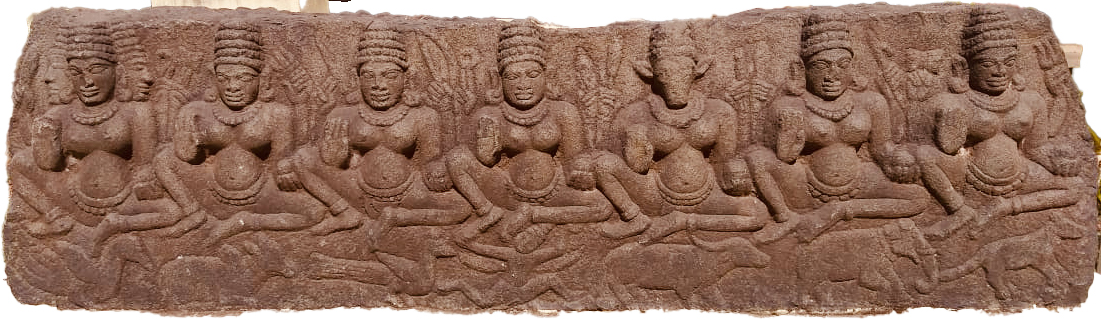
13th-century Saptamatrikas Panagal Group of Temples ruins, Sakti tradition; Indrani is the one with elephant icon below her

In Shaktism, the goddess-oriented sect of Hinduism, Indrani (or Aindri) is the name of one of the Sapta Matrika—the seven divine mothers. Sometimes, Indra's wife and the Matrika are equated into one goddess.

The legends of the Matrikas are narrated in various texts. In the Devi Mahatmyam, when the gods could not defeat the powerful demons Shumbha and Nishumbha, their Shaktis (power) personified themselves to defeat the demon. Indrani is described to be emerging from Indra and has similar characteristics to him. According to later chapters in the Devi Mahatmyam, the Matrikas appeared again to defeat Raktabija, a demon with the power to multiply himself whenever a drop of his blood reached the ground. In this battle, the Matrikas emerged from different parts of the supreme goddess.

The Varaha Purana associates each of the Matrikas with an emotion; Indrani is associated with jealousy.

== Iconography and worship ==
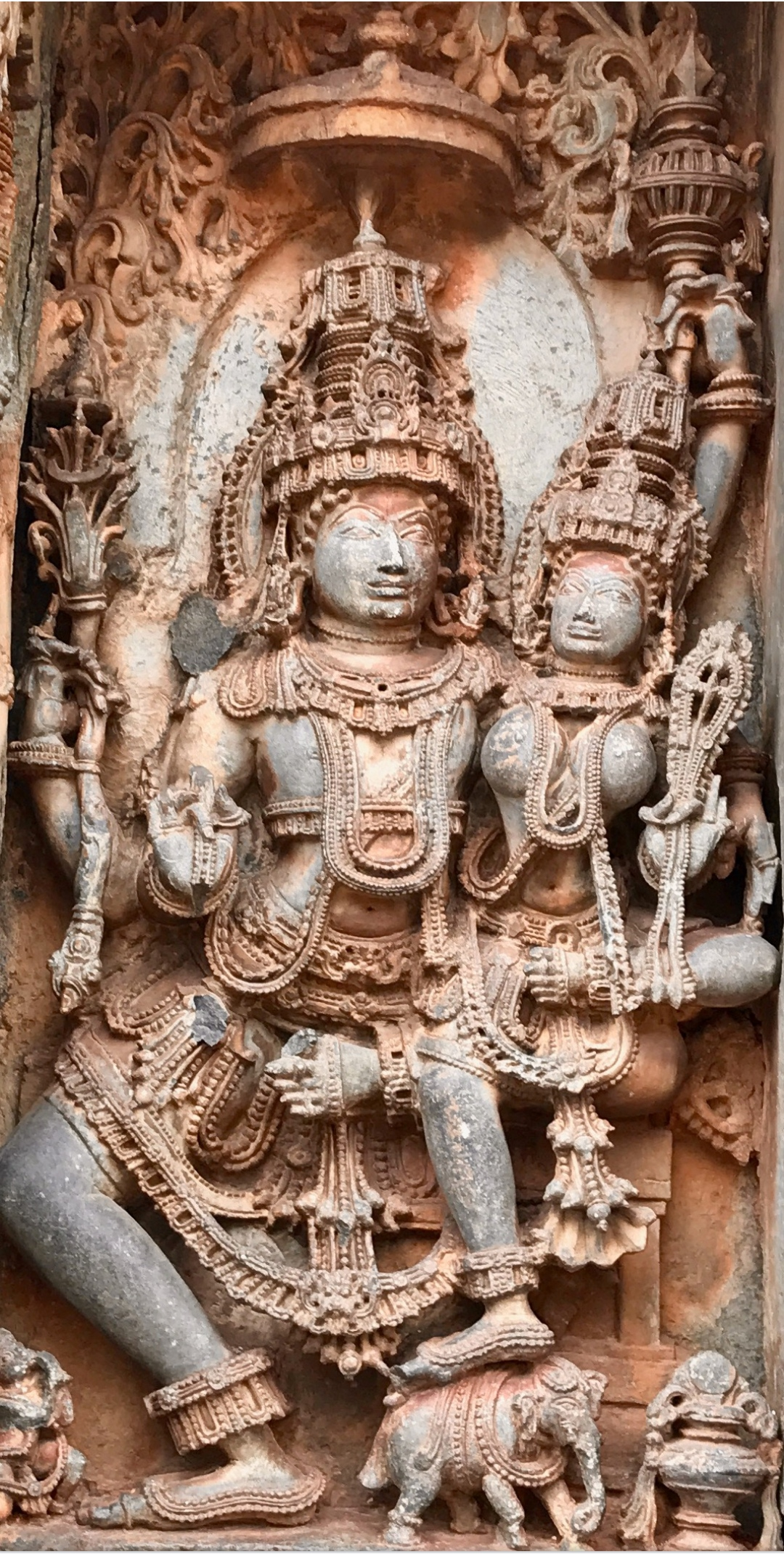
Indra and Indrani at a temple, India, c. 12th century

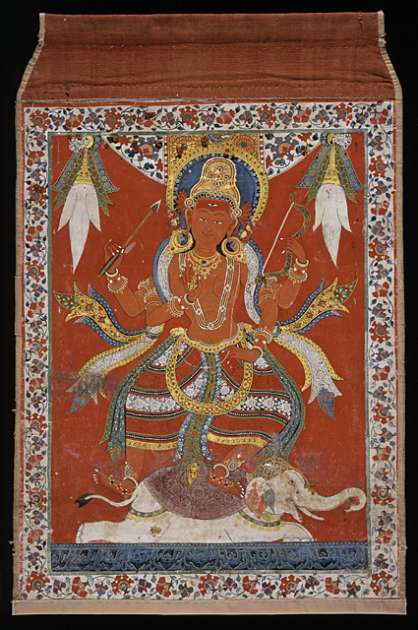
A painting of the Matrika Indrani, Nepal, c. 1800

Sculptures of Indrani and Indra are common in Hindu temples. They are typically depicted sitting on the white elephant Airavata. While explaining the iconography as described in the Vishnudharmottara, archeologist T. A. Gopinatha Rao writes that Indrani should be depicted with two arms, seated on the lap of her husband. She is of golden complexion and is dressed in blue garment. One of her hand embraces Indra, while the other one carries a santana-manjari. The text Amshumadbhed-agama contains a similar account, according to which she should be shown as a joyful young lady, decorated with all kinds of ornaments and carrying a utpala flower (Nymphaea nouchali) in her hand.

Rao describes the Matrika Indrani as being red, with three eyes and four hands. Two of her hands should be in Varada and Abhaya mudra, while the other two hands hold a vajra (thunderbolt) and a spear. She wears a kirita on her head and is decorated with various ornaments. Her vahana (vehicle), as well as her emblem banner, is an elephant. According to the Vishnudharmottara, like Indra, Indrani is yellow and has one thousand eyes. She has six arms, four of which carry a sutra, vajra, pot, and vessel. The remaining two are in Abhaya and Varada mudra. The Devi Bhagavata Purana states that Indrani has two arms and carries an ankusha (goad) and vajra, while the Purva Karangama depicts her as having two eyes and carrying a lotus in one hand. Indrani is associated with the kalpaka tree; sometimes, a lion is mentioned as her vahana.

Indrani is usually venerated with Indra and is rarely worshipped as an independent deity. Author Roshen Dalal states that Indra and Indrani are the kul devata (family deity) of the royal family of Vidarbha. In the Harivamsha, Rukmini, the chief wife of Krishna, visited a temple dedicated to Indra and Shachi. In Hindu astrology, Indrani is the ruler of Shukra (Venus) and symbolises the quality of rajas. The 7th-century Harshacharita mentions Charanas assembling in the temple of goddess Indrani. In modern times, Indrani is sometimes equated with the Matrika of the same name and is worshipped along with the other Matrikas. A puja (worship) dedicated to Indrani is performed during the Ashada Navratri.

== In other religions ==
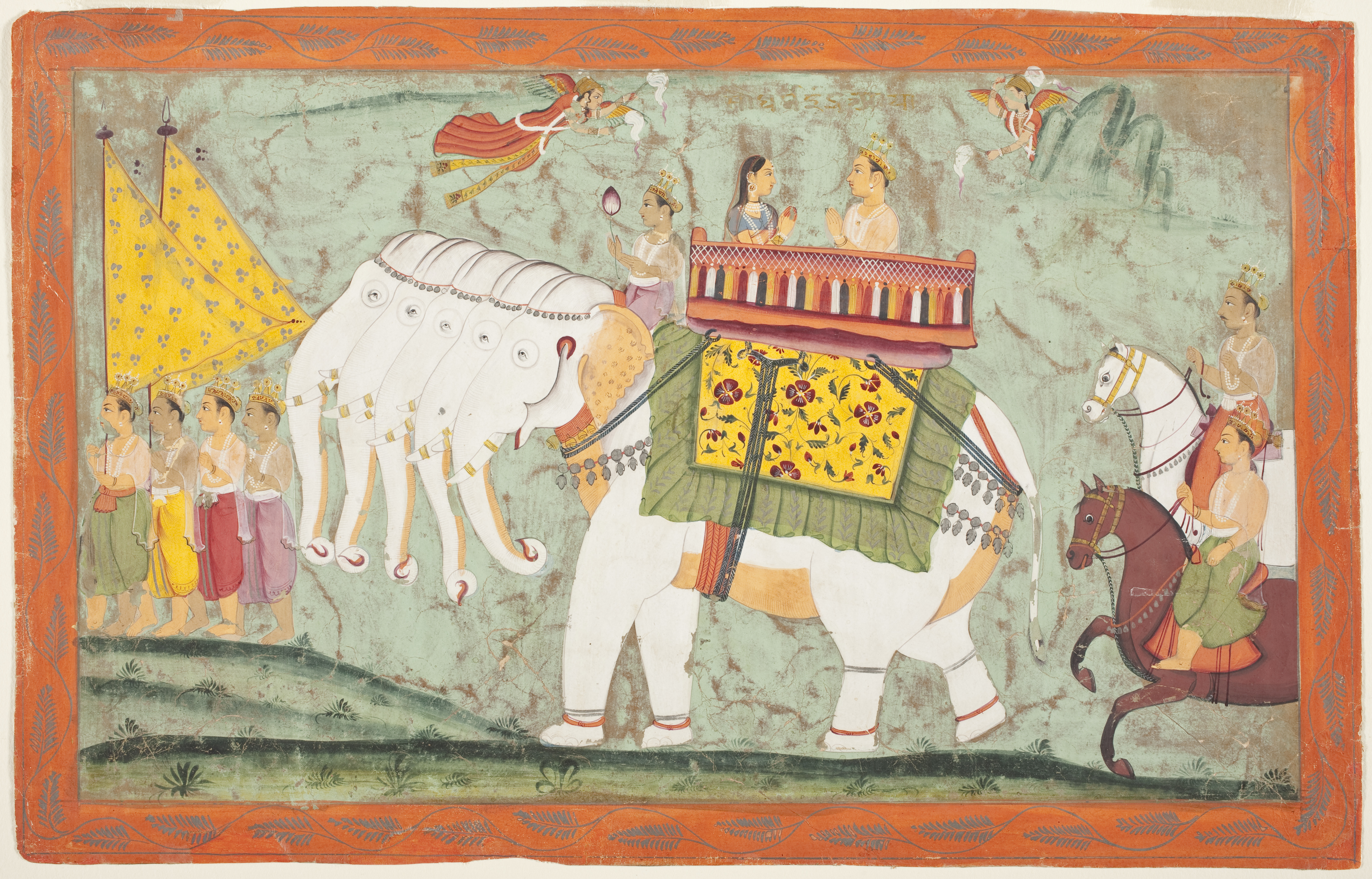
Indra and Indrani riding Airavata. Folio from a Jain text, Panch Kalyanaka, c. 1670 – c. 1680, painting in LACMA museum, originally from Amber, Rajasthan

Indrani exists in other religions, though she plays a minor role. In Jain tradition, she is a mirror image of Indra, and they represent an ideal couple. According to myth, when a Tirthankara is born, Indra descends with his consort Indrani, riding the great elephant Airavata, to celebrate the event.

In the Buddhist Pāli Canon, Indrani is referred to as Sujā, the wife of Śakra. Born to asura Vemacitrin, Sujā went through a long process and was reborn over many lifetimes to purify herself and become Śakra's wife. As Vemacitrin was his nemesis, Śakra, disguised as an old asura, came to Sujā and took her with him. After defeating Vemacitrin, Sujā and Śakra got married and she became his chief consort.
