= Religion in Cameroon =

Religion in Cameroon (CIA World Factbook 2022)
1. Catholicism (33.1%)
2. Protestantism (27.1%)
3. Other Christian (6.10%)
4. Islam (30.6%)
5. Traditional faiths (1.30%)
6. No religion (1.20%)
7. Other religions (0.70%)

Christianity is the majority religion in Cameroon, with significant minorities of Islam and traditional faiths.

Cameroon is officially a secular country. Christian churches and Muslim mosques of various denominations operate freely throughout Cameroon, while the traditionalists operate in their shrines and temples, which are also becoming popular today.

== Main religions ==
The predominant faith is Christianity, practiced by 66.3% of the population, while Islam is a significant minority faith, adhered to by 30.6%. The Christian population is divided between Roman Catholics (33.1% of the total population), Protestants (27.1%), and other Christian denominations (including Jehovah's Witnesses) 6.1%.

The vast majority of Muslims in the country are Sunni belonging to Maliki school of jurisprudence, with approximately 2% Ahmadiyya and 3% Shia. Christians and Muslims are found in every region, although Christians are chiefly in the southern and western provinces and Muslims are the majority in the northern provinces.

Religion in Cameroon (Pew Research Center 2010)
1. Christianity (80.0%)
2. Islam (16.0%)
3. No religion (2.00%)
4. Traditional faiths (1.00%)
5. Other religions (1.00%)

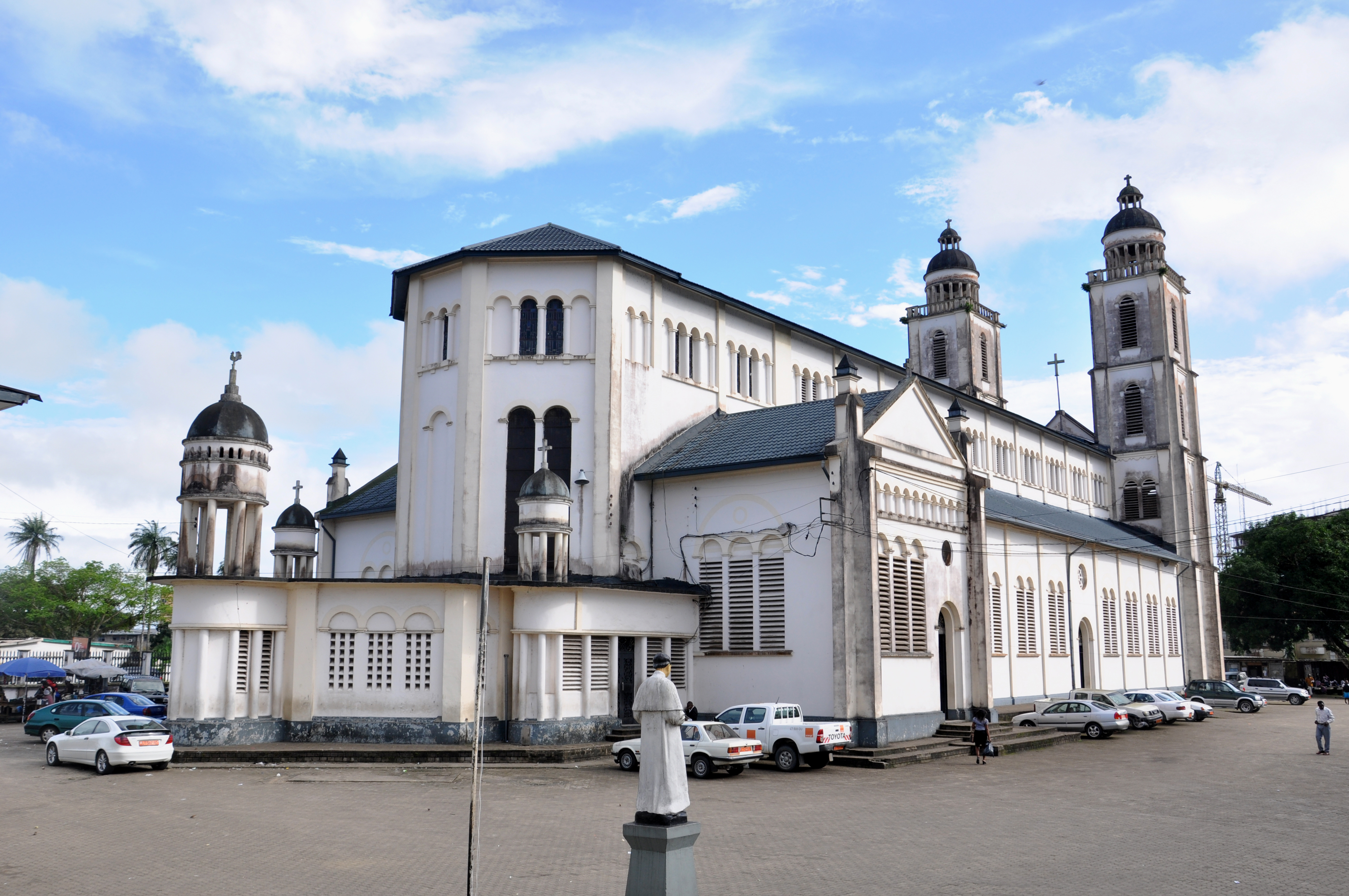
The Cathedral of Saints Peter and Paul in Douala.

== Distribution ==
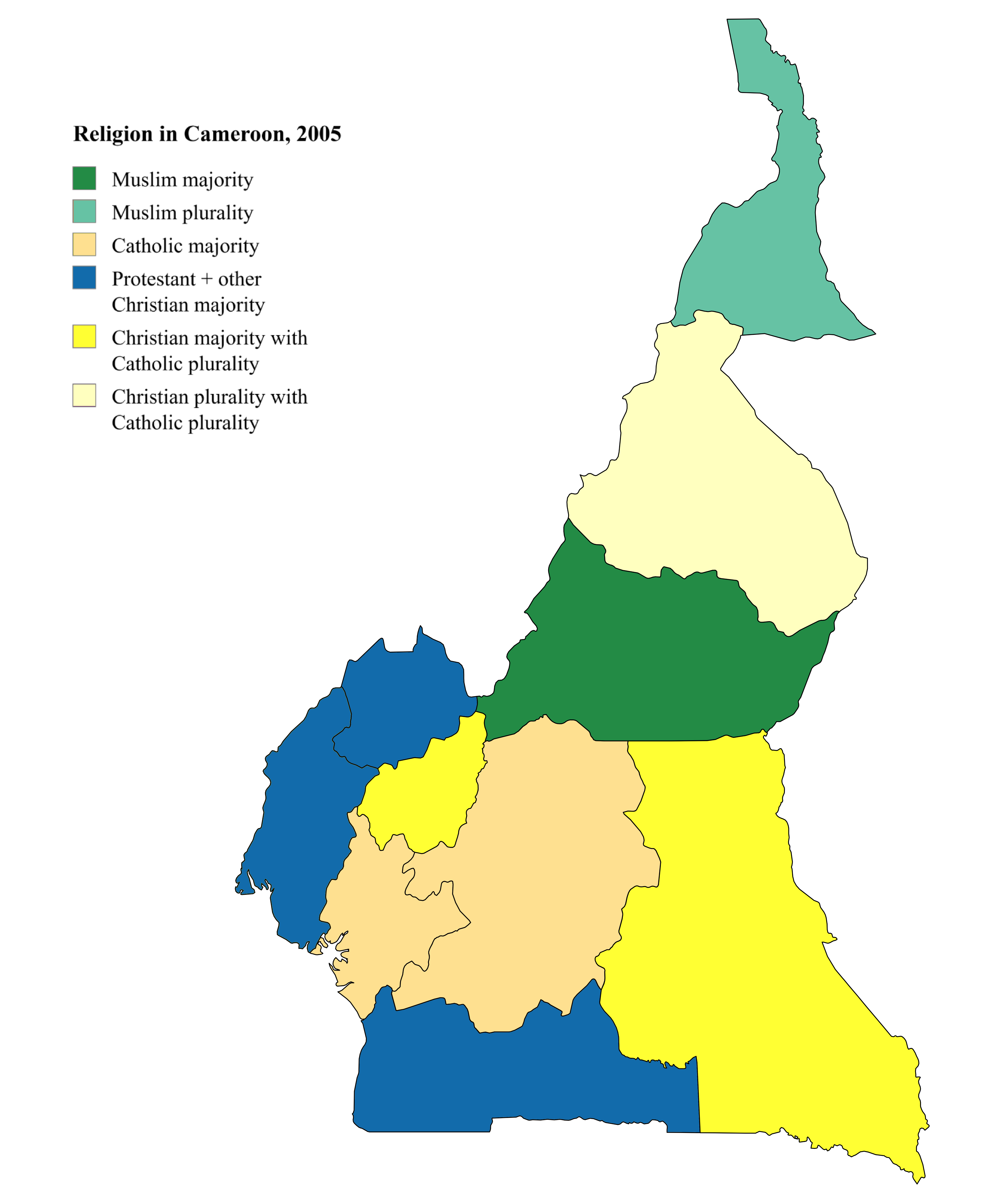
Dominant religion by Cameroon's province, 2005

The two Anglophone provinces of the western region are largely Protestant, and the Francophone provinces of the southern and western regions are largely Catholic and Evangelicals. In the northern provinces, the locally dominant Fulani (Fula: Fulɓe; French: Peul or Peuhl) ethnic group is virtually Muslim, but the overall population is fairly evenly mixed between Muslims, Christians, each often living in its own community. The Bamoun ethnic group of the West Province is largely Muslim. Apart from the Fulani who are the most dominant in numbers and politics, there are many more Islam-based ethnicities in the northern region. The Islamization of the northern regions by the Fulani extended to several ethnic groups, the majority of which are adherents of Islam such as the Musgum and Mafa. Other ethnic groups such as Kanuri were introduced to Islam through the Borno Empire. Several Islamic-based ethnic groups in the Far North Region most notably the Fulani and Kanuri who live in rural settlements do not have birth certifications or identity cards and are not included in the religion census statistics. Christianity is a minority in the northern regions with ethnic groups such as Tupuri whose population are majority followers of Christianity. Traditional indigenous religious beliefs are practiced in rural areas throughout the country but rarely are practiced publicly in cities, in part because many indigenous religious groups are intrinsically local in character. There are also 200,000 Orthodox Christians (or 0.75%), with a constant and significant growth, especially in the north of the country.

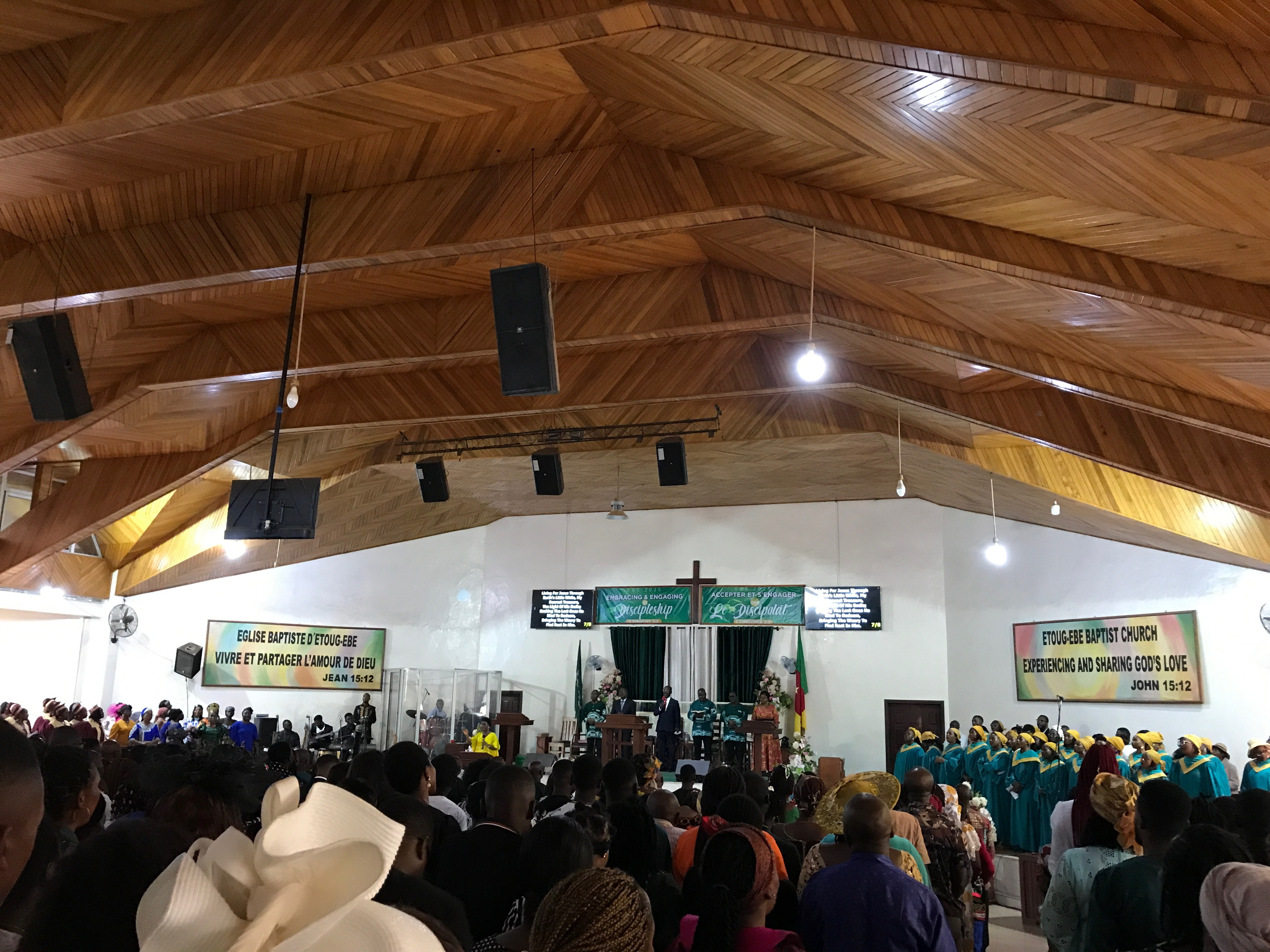
Worship service at Etoug-Ebe Baptist Church in Yaoundé.

== Other faiths ==
By 2001, the Baháʼí National Spiritual Assembly was registered with the Government of Cameroon as one of the few non-Christian foreign religions. As of 2020, there were almost 70,000 adherents of the Baháʼí Faith in the country.

There is a tiny population of Jews in Cameroon who have established ties with the wider global Jewish community. In 2010, a community of approximately 50 people practiced some form of Judaism in the country. Hinduism is the faith practiced by some South Asian migrants.

== Religious freedom ==
The Constitution provides for a secular state with freedom of religion in Cameroon. In 2023, the country was scored 2 out of 4 for religious freedom.

== See also ==
- Baháʼí Faith in Cameroon
- Catholic Church in Cameroon
- Christianity in Cameroon
- Freedom of religion in Cameroon
- Islam in Cameroon
- Judaism in Cameroon
- Zamba (god)
