= Puloman =

Hindu mythological character

- Affiliation: Danavas

Genealogy
- Parents: Kashyapa (father); Danu (mother)
- Children: Shachi, the Paulomans

Puloman, also known as Puloma, is a figure in Hindu mythology. He is mentioned as one of the chiefs of the Danavas race, whose progenitors were the sage Kashyapa and his wife Danu. Puloman was also the father of Shachi, the wife of the god Indra.
