= Freedom of religion in Cameroon =

The Constitution of Cameroon provides for a secular state with freedom of religion.

Muslim centers and Christian churches of various denominations operate freely throughout the country. Approximately 60% of the population is at least nominally Christian (divided approximately equally between Catholic and Protestant), 20% is at least nominally Muslim, and 19% practice traditional indigenous religious beliefs. Christians are concentrated chiefly in the southern and western provinces and Muslims reside in large numbers in every province. Traditional indigenous religious beliefs are practiced in rural areas throughout the country but rarely are practiced publicly in cities.

In 2022, several difficulties in the country were noted, including terrorist attacks on religious buildings in the far north, tensions between Christians and Muslims, and problems with religious groups trying to register with the government.

In 2023, the country was scored 2 out of 4 for religious freedom.

In the same year, Open Doors ranked it as the 45th worst country to be a Christian.

The rest of this article in informed by the US State Dept 2007 report on Religious Freedom in Cameroon. A later report is available.

== Status of religious freedom ==
=== Legal and policy framework ===
The Constitution provides for freedom of religion, and the Government generally respected this right in practice. The Government at all levels sought to protect all rights in full and did not tolerate its abuse, either by governmental or private actors. There is no official state religion.

Christian and Islamic holy days are celebrated as national holidays. These include the Christian holy days of Good Friday, Ascension Day, Assumption Day, and Christmas Day, and the Islamic holy days of the Feast of the Lamb and Eid al-Fitr, the End of Ramadan.

The Law on Religious Congregations governs relations between the Government and religious groups. The Ministry of Territorial Administration and Decentralization MINATD must approve and register religious groups in order for them to function legally. There were no reports that the Government refused to register any group; however, the process can take a number of years. It is illegal for a religious group to operate without official recognition, but the law prescribes no specific penalties. There was a growth within the major cities of so-called "sects," which their leaders consider to be subgroups of Protestant denominations; few of these are registered, and all of them operate freely. Although official recognition confers no general tax benefits, it allows religious groups to receive real estate as tax-free gifts and legacies for the conduct of their activities.

To register, a religious denomination must legally qualify as a religious congregation. The definition includes "any group of natural persons or corporate bodies whose vocation is divine worship" or "any group of persons living in community in accordance with a religious doctrine." The denomination then submits a file to the MINATD. The file must include a request for authorization, a copy of the group's charter describing planned activities, and the names and functions of the group's officials. The Minister reviews the file and sends it to the presidency with a recommendation to approve or deny. The president generally follows the recommendation of the Minister and grants authorization by a presidential decree. The approval process may take up to several years.

The only religious groups known to be registered are Christian, Muslim, and Baháʼí. According to the latest MINATD statistics (released in 2002), there are 38 officially registered denominations, most of which are Christian. There also are numerous unregistered small religious groups that operate freely. The Government does not register traditional indigenous religious groups, stating that the practice of traditional religion is a private concern observed by members of a particular ethnic or kinship group or the residents of a particular locality.

The MINATD, rather than the judiciary, primarily resolves disputes between or within registered religious groups about control of places of worship, schools, other real estate, or financial assets.

Missionary groups are present and operate without impediment. The licensing requirements for foreign groups are the same as those for domestic religious denominations.

The practice of witchcraft is a criminal offense under the national penal code, punishable by a 2 to 10-year prison term.

Several religious denominations operate primary and secondary schools. Although post-secondary education continues to be dominated by state institutions, private schools affiliated with religious denominations, including Catholic, Protestant, and Qur'anic schools, have been among the best schools at the primary and secondary levels for many years. The law charges the Ministry of Basic Education and the Ministry of Secondary Education with ensuring that private schools run by religious groups meet the same standards as state-operated schools in terms of curriculum, infrastructure, and teacher training. For schools affiliated with religious groups, the Sub-Department of Confessional Education of the Department of Private Education performs this oversight function. School attendance - at public, private, or parochial schools - is mandatory through junior high school. The campuses of the Central Africa Catholic University, The Cameroon Christian University and the International Adventist University are located in the country.

The Presbyterian Church in Cameroon operates one of the country's few modern private printing presses and also the Roman Catholic Church publishes a weekly newspaper through its own Modern printing press.

A 2000 government decree requires potential commercial radio broadcasters to submit a licensing application, pay a fee when the application is approved, and pay an annual licensing fee. The Government has been slow in granting authorization; consequently, there are many unauthorized radio stations operating. Two private religious radio stations, the Pentecostal Radio Bonne Nouvelle and Radio Reine (managed by a Catholic priest although not officially sponsored by the Catholic Church), that had been broadcasting without licenses continued to broadcast while awaiting official authorization, as do many other radio stations awaiting their licenses. The Catholic station Radio Veritas has temporary authorization to broadcast and has been broadcasting without incident.

The state-sponsored television station, CRTV, carries two hours of Christian programming on Sunday mornings, normally an hour of Catholic Mass and an hour of a Protestant service. There is also one broadcast hour dedicated to Islam on Friday evenings. State-sponsored radio broadcasts Christian and Islamic religious services on a regular basis, and both the radio and television stations periodically broadcast religious ceremonies on national holidays or during national events. State television occasionally broadcasts ecumenical ceremonies on major occasions such as the commemoration of a national event.

=== Restrictions on religious freedom ===
Government policy and practice contributed to the generally free practice of religion.

The practice of witchcraft is a criminal offense under the national penal code. People generally are prosecuted for this offense only in conjunction with some other offense such as murder; however, there were no reports of convictions of witchcraft under this law. The Government distinguishes between witchcraft and traditional indigenous religious practices; witchcraft is defined by the law as attempts to do harm by spiritual means and is a common explanation for diseases.

There were no reports of religious prisoners or detainees in the country.

=== Forced religious conversion ===
There were no reports of forced religious conversion, including of minor U.S. citizens who had been abducted or illegally removed from the United States, or of the refusal to allow such citizens to be returned to the United States. In 2004 the Government responded promptly to assist the U.S. Embassy in the case of the forced conversion of American citizens by a private actor.

== Societal abuses and discrimination ==
There were no reports of societal abuses or discrimination based on religious belief or practice; however, some religious groups reported societal hostility within their regions. Established churches denounced new unaffiliated religious groups, most of which are individually motivated Tele-ministries, as "sects" or "cults," claiming that they were detrimental to societal peace and harmony. In practice, such denunciation did not inhibit the practice of the unaffiliated religious groups. In the northern provinces, especially in rural areas, societal hostility by Muslims against Christians and persons who practice traditional indigenous religious beliefs continued.

When there have been natural disasters, or to commemorate national events, Christians and Muslims organized ecumenical ceremonies to pray and promote a spirit of tolerance and peace.

== See also ==
- Religion in Cameroon
- Human rights in Cameroon
