= Islam in Cameroon =

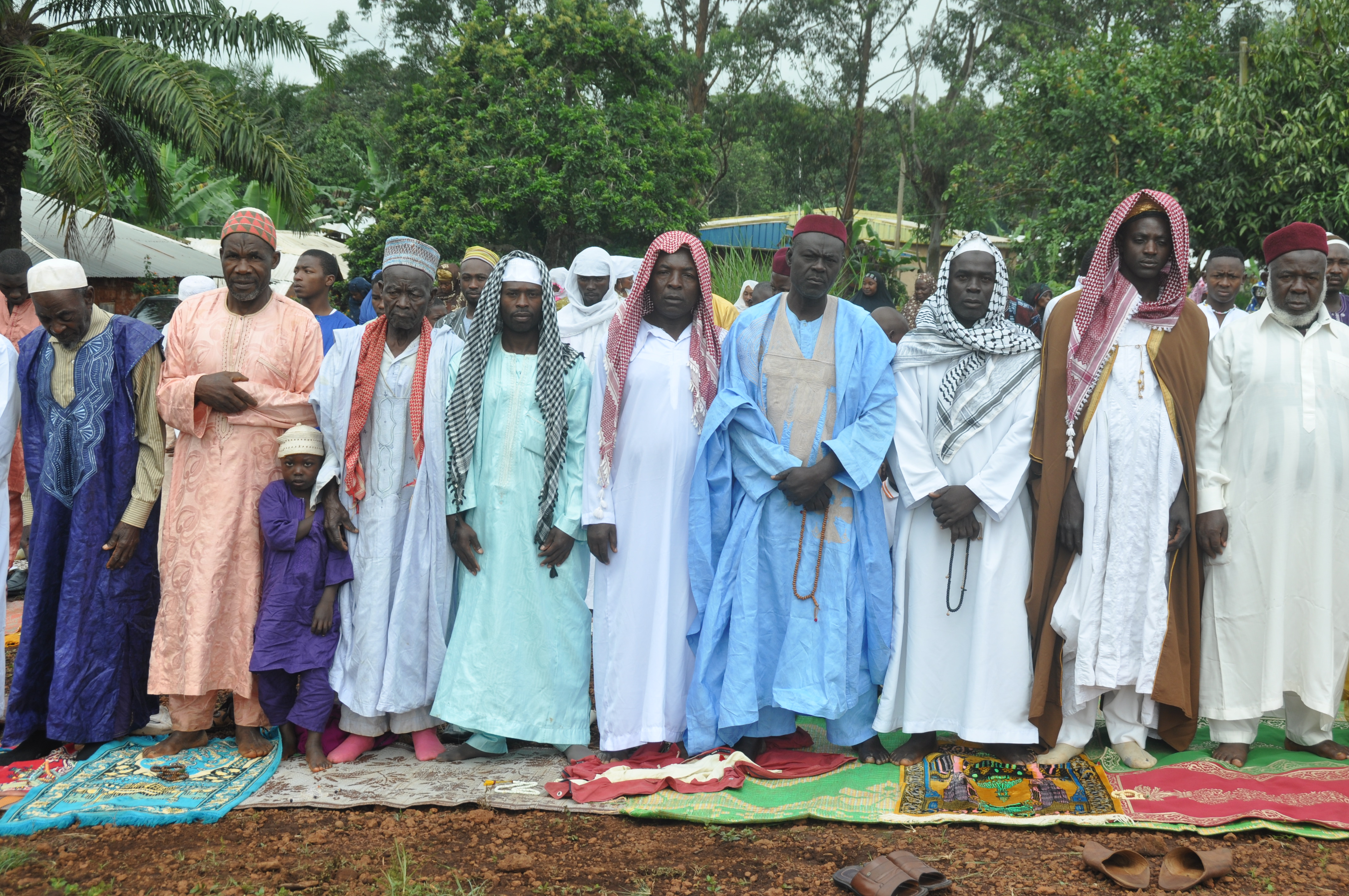
Muslims in Cameroon

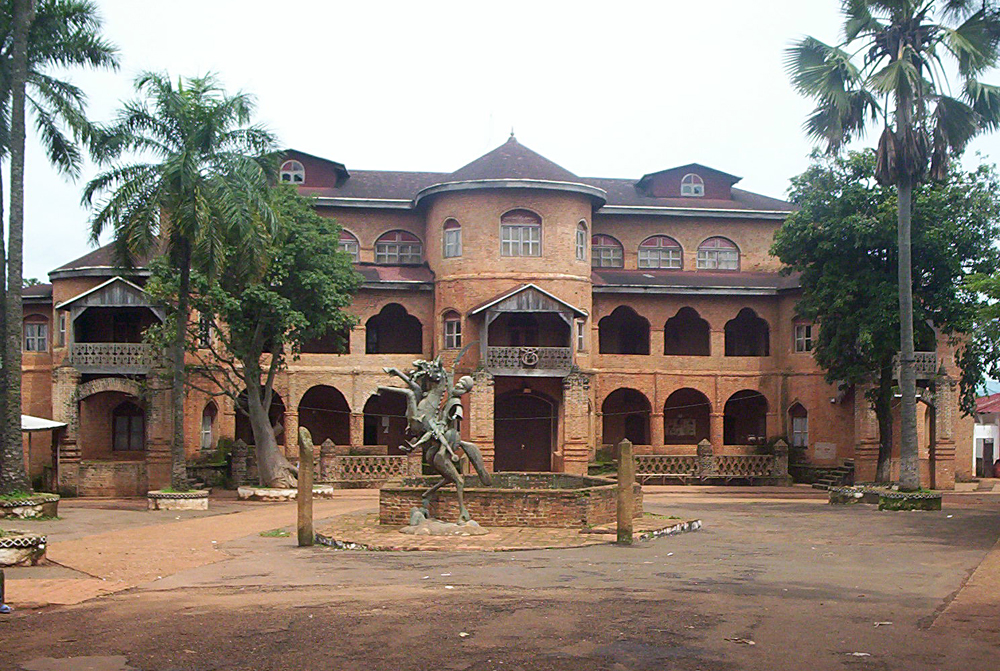
The palace of the sultan of the Bamun people at Foumban, West Region

Islam is the second largest religion in Cameroon practiced by around 30.6% of the total population as of 2022. Among Cameroonian Muslims, approximately 40% identify themselves as Non-denominational, 27% Sunni, 12% Ahmadi and 3% Shia, while the majority of the rest do not associate themselves with a particular group and sect.

In Cameroon, 48% of Muslims belong to a Sufi Tariqah (order). The Fulani, a pastoral nomadic group, spread Islam in early 19th century West Africa largely through commercial activity and Sufi brotherhoods (Qadiri and Tijani). In the northern provinces, the locally dominant Fulani is overwhelmingly Muslim. Other ethnic groups, known collectively as the Kirdi, generally practice some form of Islam. The Bamoun ethnic group of the West Province is also largely Muslim.

== Islam in German Cameroon 1884-1916 ==
In the rush to claim African territories, Germany first entered Cameroon in 1884 and by 1902 had established rule in northern Cameroon. Throughout the German colonial period, the Adamawa and Lake Chad regions were governed by combining heavy military presence with indirect rule. The local Muslim rulers, called Lamido in Adamawa and Sultan in the far north, remained in power, although their influence was much more limited than during the nineteenth century, owing their legitimacy to the Germans and not to the Emir in Yola, the Caliph in Sokoto or the Shehu in Kuka. Existing political and legal institutions, together with Muslim and native law and customs, were kept intact. Contrary to British rule in Northern Nigeria, German indirect rule did not involve immediate taxes or land reforms before 1913, when such reforms were proposed but, due to the war, never implemented.

== See also ==
- Religion in Cameroon
