= Babi (mythology) =

Ancient Egyptian deity

- Babi as a man with the head of a baboon
- Other names: Baba, Bebon
Name in hieroglyphs
D58 G29 N33C D58 M17 M17
- Animals: hamadryas baboon
- Symbol: Aggression, fertility, & strength

Genealogy
- Parents: Osiris
- Siblings: Anubis, Horus

Babi, also Baba, in ancient Egyptian religion, was the deification of the hamadryas baboon, one of the animals present in ancient Egypt. His name is usually translated as "bull of the baboons", roughly meaning "chief of the baboons".

Baboons are extremely aggressive and omnivorous, and Babi was viewed as being very bloodthirsty, and living on entrails. Consequently, he was viewed as devouring the souls of the sinful after they had been weighed against Maat (the concept of truth/order), and was thus said to stand by a lake of fire, representing destruction. Since this judging of righteousness was an important part of the underworld, Babi was said to be the first-born son of Osiris, the god of the dead in the same regions in which people believed in Babi.

Baboons also have noticeably high libidos, in addition to their high level of genital marking, and so Babi was considered the god of virility of the dead. He was usually portrayed with an erection, and due to the association with the judging of souls, was sometimes depicted as using it as the mast of the ferry which conveyed the righteous to Aaru, a series of islands. One spell in a funerary text identifies the deceased person's phallus with Babi, ensuring that the deceased will be able to have sexual intercourse in the afterlife.

== Mythology ==
The Papyrus Jumilhac describes a mythological conflict between the gods Thoth and Babi. In the story, Babi, depicted as a red dog with yellow eyes, accuses Thoth of theft before the Ennead and the sun god Ra. However, the Ennead rejects the accusation, as they did not witness the alleged crime. When Babi continues to spread rumors about Thoth, the latter retaliates by anointing Babi's sleeping phallus with his writing reed and casting a spell upon him. This enchantment causes Babi's penis to swell during intercourse, making it impossible for him to separate from his partner. When Babi engages in intercourse with an unnamed female, his penis swells, and he becomes trapped. Thoth then convenes the Great and Small Ennead, mocking Babi's exposed testicles. Ra declares Babi guilty, though the exact nature of his crime remains unclear. As punishment, Babi is handed over to Thoth, who executes him on a sacrificial block. This passage in the papyrus appears to justify the tradition of sacrificing a dog in Thoth's honor.

Babi's offense could have been rape, adultery, or simply excessive sexual indulgence. His partner is referred to as “mnt”, which translates to “someone”, suggesting that her identity is either irrelevant or deliberately concealed. In ancient Egyptian belief, written words held power, so crimes against deities—such as the murder of Osiris—were often described in euphemistic terms. A related inscription in the Temple of Edfu includes a spell to suppress Babi's sexual virility with a goddess who is paradoxically referred to as both a “God’s Wife” and a woman who abstains from relationships with gods and men. The title “God’s Wife” was used for both priestesses and goddesses associated with the Eye of Ra. A similar mythological motif appears in the Mythological Manual of the Delta, where a goddess is bound and raped by Set while she is holding onto him to prevent his escape.

Another reference to Babi and dogs appears in the Papyrus Geneva. In an episode from Horus' childhood, the goddess Isis warns her son Horus to stay away from Babi, who is roaming the land with 77 dogs. When Horus is bitten on the lower leg by one of Babi's dogs, Isis instructs him to treat the wound with an unknown plant called Sryw, which had been stored in jars exposed to sunlight. The text seems to serve as a medical guide for dog bites, identifying the patient with Horus himself. The dog is then fed the plant, after which it dies, symbolizing the removal of the venom, while the patient is now able to recover.
