= Sexual dimorphism in non-human primates =

Sexual differences in primates

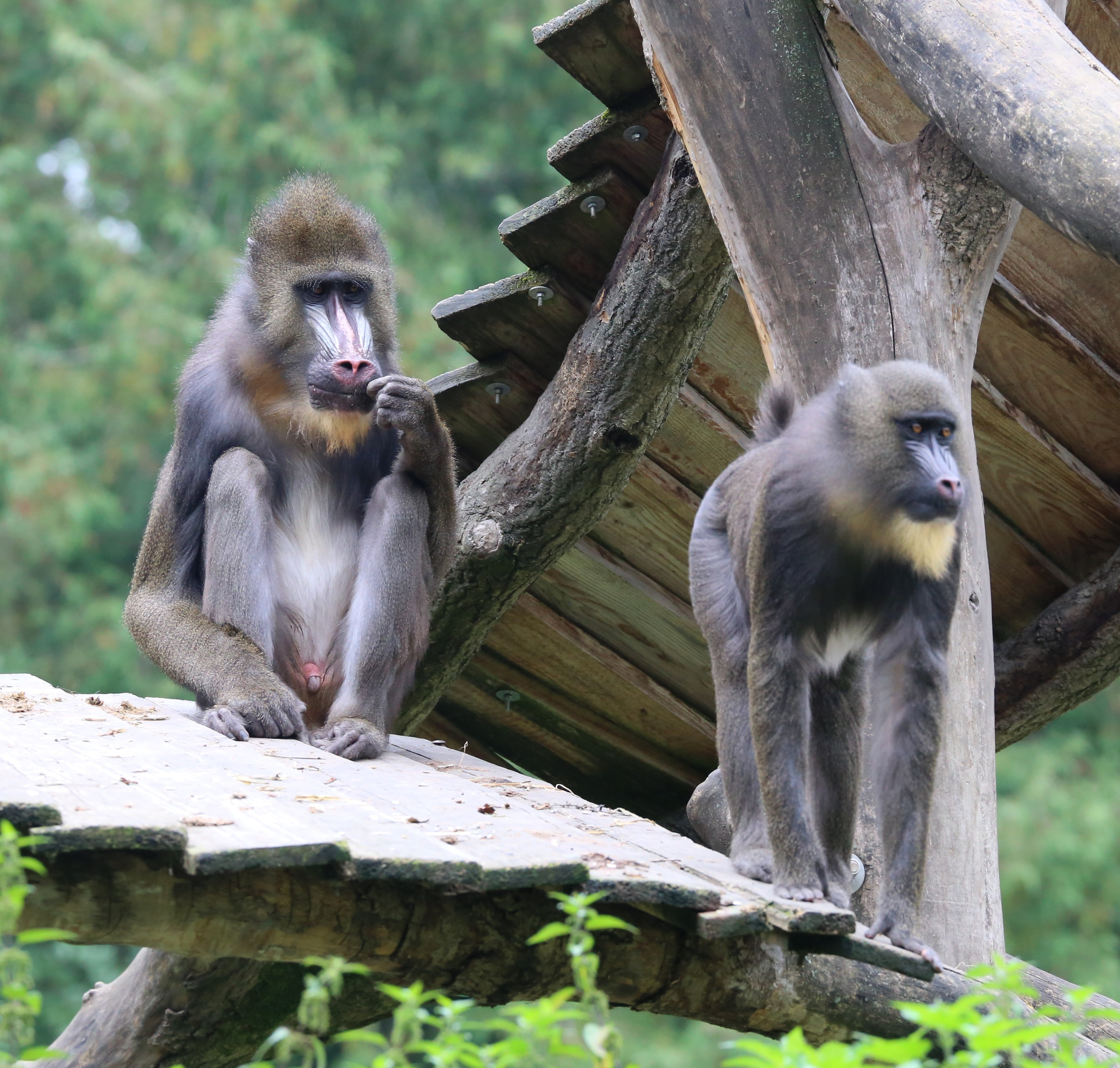
Mandrill male (left) and female (right)

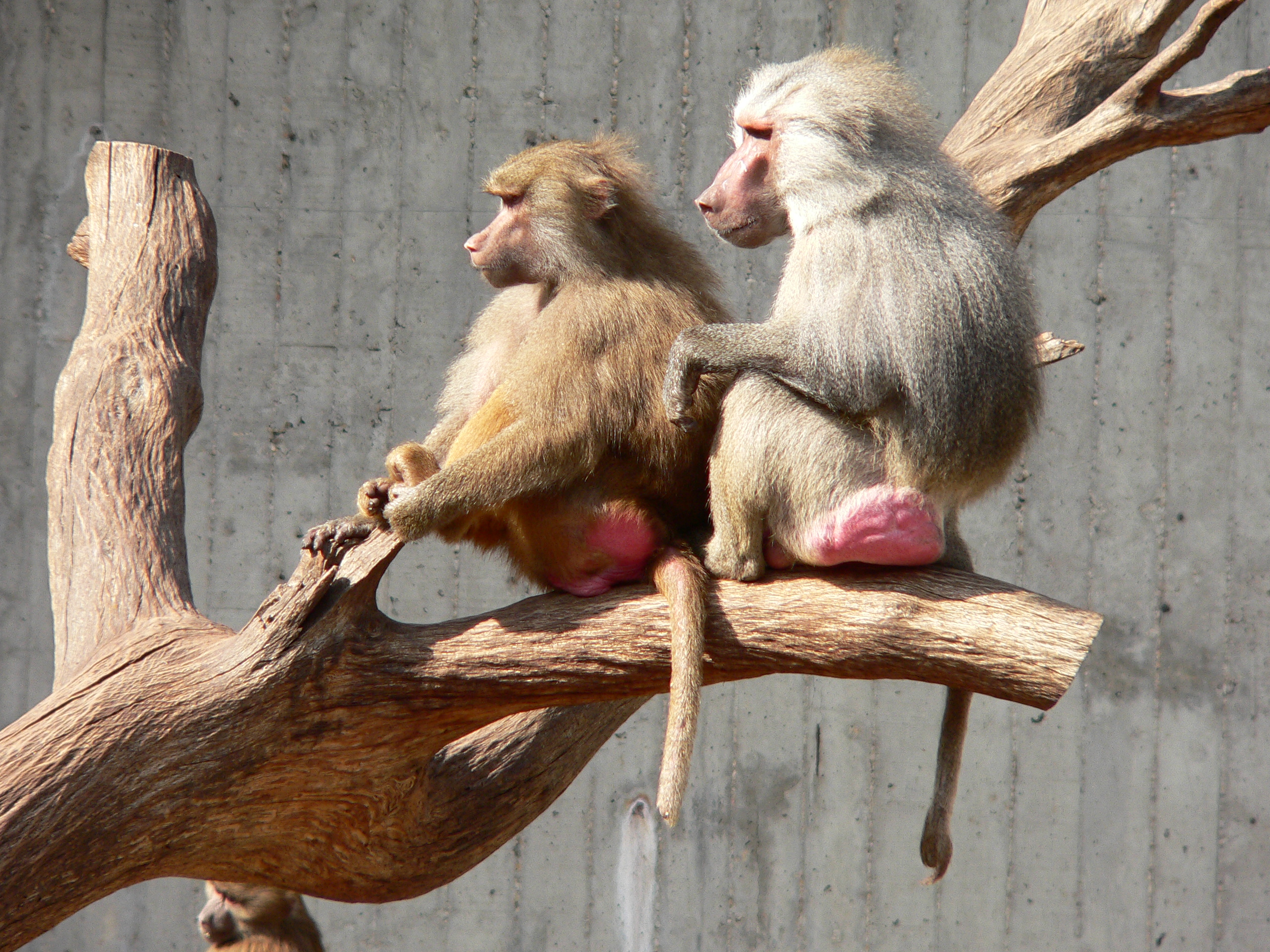
Hamadryas baboon female (left) and male (right)

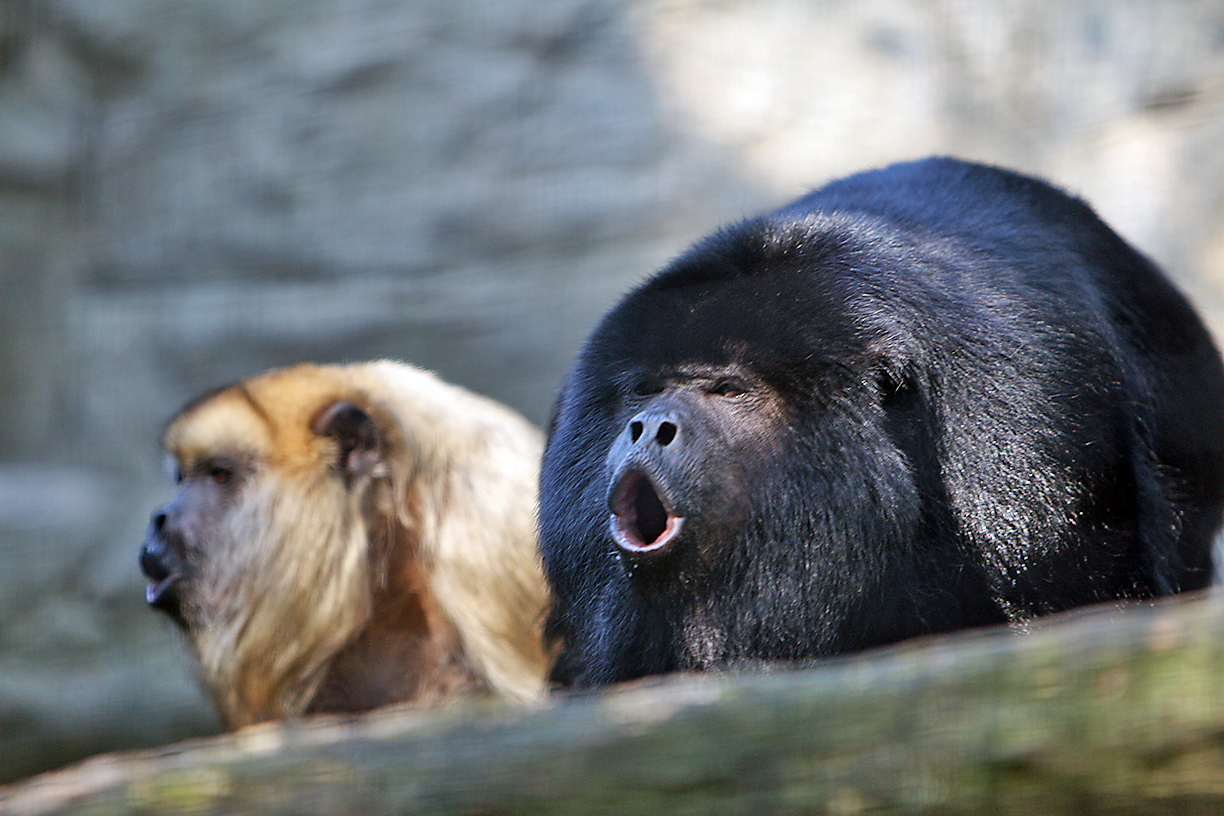
Black howler monkey female (left) and male (right)

Sexual dimorphism describes the morphological, physiological, and behavioral differences between males and females of the same species. Most primates are sexually dimorphic for different biological characteristics, such as body size, canine tooth size, craniofacial structure, skeletal dimensions, pelage color and markings, and vocalization. However, such sex differences are primarily limited to the anthropoid primates; most of the strepsirrhine primates (lemurs and lorises) and tarsiers are monomorphic.

Sexual dimorphism can manifest itself in many different forms. In male and female primates there are obvious physical differences such as body size or canine size. Dimorphism can also be seen in skeletal features such as the shape of the pelvis or the robustness of the skeleton. There are two mating systems in the sexual selection of primates.

== Types ==
=== Body size ===
Extant primates exhibit a broad range of variation in sexual size dimorphism (SSD), or sexual divergence in body size. It ranges from species such as gibbons and strepsirrhines (including Madagascar's lemurs) in which males and females have almost the same body sizes to species such as chimpanzees and bonobos in which males' body sizes are larger than females' body sizes. In extreme cases, males have body sizes that are almost twice as large as those of females, as in some species including gorillas, orangutans, mandrills, hamadryas baboons, and proboscis monkeys. Patterns of size dimorphism exhibited in primates may correspond to the intensity of competition between members of the same sex for access to mates–intrasexual competition, counteracted by fecundity selection on the other sex. Some callitrichine and strepsirrhine primates are, however, characterized by the reverse dimorphism, a phenomenon in which females are larger than males.

=== Tooth size ===
Canine sexual dimorphism is one particular type of sexual dimorphism, in which males of a species have larger canines than females. Within primates, the male and female canine tooth size varies among different taxonomic subgroups, yet canine dimorphism is most extensively found in catarrhines among haplorhine primates. For example, in many baboons and macaques, the size of male canines is more than twice as large as that of female canines. It is rare, yet females in some species are known to have larger canines than males, such as the eastern brown mouse lemur (Microcebus rufus). Sexual dimorphism in canine tooth size is relatively weak or absent in extant strepsirrhine primates. The South American titi monkeys (Callicebus moloch), for instance, do not exhibit any differences in the size of canine teeth between the sexes.

Among different types of teeth constituting the dentition of primates, canines exhibit the greatest degree of variation in tooth size, whereas incisors have less variation and cheek teeth have the least. A canine dimorphism is also more widely seen in maxillary canines than in mandibular canines.

=== Craniofacial structure ===
Craniofacial sex differentiation among anthropoid primates varies in a wide range and is known to arise primarily through ontogenetic processes. Studies on hominids have shown that, in general, males tend to have a greater increase of facial volume than of neurocranial volume, a more obliquely oriented foramen magnum, and a more pronounced rearrangement of the nuchal region. The breadth, length and height of the neurocranium in adult male macaques, guenons, orangutans and gorillas are about nine percent larger than the neurocranial dimensions in adult females, whereas in spider monkeys and gibbons the sex differences is on a general average about 4 to 5 percent. In orangutans, males and females share similarities in facial dimensions and growth in terms of orbits, nasal width, and facial width. They tend to have some significant differences, however, in various facial heights (e.g., height of the anterior face, premaxilla, and nose).

=== Skeletal structure ===
Primates also exhibit sexual dimorphism in skeletal structures. In general, skeletal dimorphism in primates is primarily known as a product of body mass dimorphism. Hence, males have proportionally larger skeletons compared to females due to their larger body masses. Larger and more robust skeletal structures in males is also attributable to better developed muscle scarring, and more intense cresting of bones compared to those of females. Male gorillas, for example, possess large sagittal and nuchal crests, which correspond to their large temporalis muscles and nuchal musculature. Also, an unusual skeletal dimorphism includes enlarged, hollow hyoid bones found in males of gibbons and howler monkeys, which contribute to the resonation of their voices.

=== Pelage color and markings ===
Sex differences in pelage, such as capes of hair, beards, or crests, and skin can be found in several species among adult primates. Several species (e.g., Lemur macaco, Pithecia pithecia, Alouatta caraya) show an extensive dimorphism in pelage colors or patterning. For example, in mandrills (Mandrillus sphinx), males display extensive red and blue coloration on their face, rump and genitalia as compared to females. Male mandrills also possess a yellow beard, nuchal crest of hair, and pronounced boney paranasal ridges, all of which are absent or vestigial in females. Studies have shown that male color in mandrills serves as a badge of social status in the species.

=== Temporary sexual dimorphism ===
Some sexual dimorphic traits in primates are known to appear on a temporary basis. In squirrel monkeys (Saimiri sciureus), males can gain fat as much as 25 percent of the body mass only during the breeding season, specifically in their upper torso, arms, and shoulders. This seasonal phenomenon, known as "male fattening," is associated with both male–male competition and female choice for larger males. Orangutan males tend to gain weight and develop large cheek flanges, when they achieve dominance over other group members.

=== Vocalization ===
In many adult primates, dimorphism in the vocal repertoire can appear in both call production (e.g., calls with a particular set of acoustic traits) and usage (e.g., call frequency and context-specificity) between the sexes. Sex-specific calls are commonly found in Old World monkeys, in which males produce loud calls for intergroup spacing and females produce copulation calls for sexual activity. Forest guenons also tend to display strong vocal divergences between sexes, with mostly sex-specific call types. Studies on De Brazza's monkeys (Cercopithecus neglectus), one of the African guenon species, have shown that call rates in adult females (24 call.hr-1) are more than seven times higher than in adult males (2.5call.hr-1). A usage of different call types also differs between sexes, in that females mostly utter contact(-food) calls, whereas males produce a great number of threat calls. Such difference in vocal usage is associated with social roles, with females being involved in more social tasks within the group and males being responsible for territory defense.

== Ultimate mechanisms ==
Ultimate mechanisms explain the evolutionary history and functional significance of the sexual dimorphism expressed among primates.

=== Intrasexual selection ===
Intrasexual selection is one of two components that make up sexual selection as defined by Darwin and refers to competition within a sex for access to mates. For species where such competition determines their reproductive success, selection pressures for increased strength/size and weaponry/canines are heightened, resulting in the evolution of sexual dimorphism. The most common illustration of intrasexual selection is male–male competition, in which males of a species fight or threaten each other for preferential access to females.

A prime example of intrasexual selection can be found in baboons. Male baboons are known to violently fight and threaten each other over females and show high levels of sexual dimorphism in body and canine size, both of which are assumed to aid in combat. The "winners" of such interactions mate with the desired female and produce offspring, passing their traits to the next generation, while unsuccessful males are excluded from mating. As a result, traits beneficial to fighting are selected for in the population over time.

Intrasexual selection also operates through female–female competition. Female howler monkeys, for example, experience frequent agonistic encounters both within and between coalitions. One possible evolutionary explanation for female–female competition in red howler monkeys is its role as a counter-strategy to infanticide through group size regulation (by evicting other females). Instances of female–female competition such as this could potentially select for greater body and/or canine size in females, as well as reduce the pressure for those same traits in males by limiting the occurrence of male–male competition (as group size regulation reduces the likelihood of threats/takeovers by immigrant males), overall reducing dimorphism.

=== Intersexual selection ===
Intersexual selection is often represented by female choice, but more generally refers to differential preferences one sex has for individuals of the opposite sex, including sexual coercion of females by males. Sexual dimorphism arises via intersexual selection most often through female preference for certain male secondary sexual characteristics, but can also arise as a result of males' selective pressure to physically overpower females he wishes to mate with. Gamete production, gestation, lactation, and infant care are all highly energetically costly processes for females, so these energy and time constraints would lead them to choose—when possible—mates with higher quality genes leading to higher quality offspring with a better chance of survival and reproductive success. Importantly, what is deemed "high quality" by the female in this instance need not confer a survival advantage to the male, but must be perceived by females as a sign of attractiveness if not health. A common example of this is sexually dimorphic coloration.

In rhesus macaques, red facial coloration is attractive to females to the point of influencing the reproductive success of high-ranking males. To be deemed a sexually selected trait said trait must be heritable and confer a reproductive advantage. In this example, facial redness is heritable, but only increases a male's reproductive success if he is also high-ranking, and rank is not determined by facial redness (dominance in rhesus macaques is not competition-based but rather queue-based). While this trait is believed to be the result of intersexual selection, such examples demonstrate the complex nature of determining evolutionary explanations for sexually dimorphic characteristics.

Paternity confusion is another component of female choice. By actively seeking out matings with newly immigrated males, females produce offspring whose fathers are unknown. This is beneficial to females because it allows them to sire offspring without the risk of infanticide. These "sneaky matings" mean that even if a male "wins" the opportunity to mate with a female, the father of her infant is not necessarily determined by the outcome of male–male competition, thus limiting the reproductive benefits associated with such competition and dampening the pressure for sexually selected dimorphic traits.

=== Mating systems ===
In haplorhines, the degree to which intrasexual and intersexual selection drive sexual dimorphism is dependent on the social organization and mating system of a particular species. Phylogenetic studies reveal polygynous systems among haplorhines show elevated levels of dimorphism. This is expected because polygynous groups, i.e. single-male multi-female, imply males can monopolize females, suggesting male–male competition plays an important role in ensuring any opportunity to reproduce. Without somewhat guaranteed access to females—as is the case in monogamous primates—a male's lifetime reproductive output is dependent on his ability to outcompete other males and lead a group of females. As an exception, among polygynous primates, colobines as a group consistently exhibit a low level of sexual size dimorphism for unclear reasons. Gibbons, on the other hand, are an example of monogamous primates that can be described as "monomorphic," meaning males and females appear the same with little to no sexual dimorphism. The correlation between mating system and dimorphism in haplorhines likely indicates sexual selection is the driving force behind dimorphism in species of this suborder. Another more general trend observed in haplorhines is a correlation between body mass dimorphism with overall body size.

The lack of a clear relationship between mating system and intensity of sexual dimorphism in strepsirrhines remains a mystery, with some explanations ranging from ecological constraints to selection for speed and agility to unique instances of female social dominance (such as in lemurs) reducing dimorphism. One study offers a challenge to the argument that environmental constraints are the main factor driving monomorphism on Madagascar but fails to isolate specific factors to substitute this theory; simply put, there is no consensus on why strepsirrhines do not follow similar patterns to haplorhines.

=== Phylogeny ===
Similar magnitudes of body weight dimorphism have been observed in all species within several taxonomic groups such as callitrichids, hylobatids, Cercopithecus, and Macaca. Such correlation between phylogenetic relatedness and sexual dimorphism across different groups reflects similarities in their behaviors and ecological conditions, but not in independent adaptations. This idea is referred to as "phylogenetic niche conservatism."

=== Terrestriality ===
Terrestrial primates tend to show a greater degree of dimorphism than arboreal primates. It has been hypothesized that larger sizes of body mass and canine tooth are favored among males of terrestrial primates due to the likelihood of higher vulnerability to predators. Another hypothesis suggests that arboreal primates have limitations on their upper body size, given that larger body size could disrupt their usage of terminal branches for locomotion. However, among some species of guenons (Cercopithecus), arboreal blue monkeys (C. mitis) appear to be more sexually dimorphic than terrestrial vervet monkeys (C. aethiops).

=== Niche divergence ===
It has been hypothesized that niche divergence between the sexes attributes to the evolution of size dimorphism in primates. Males and females are known to have different preferences for ecological habitat due to different reproductive activities, which could possibly lead to dietary differences, followed by dimorphic morphological traits. This niche divergence hypothesis, however, has never been strongly supported due to the lack of compelling data.

== See also ==
- Sex differences in humans

== Academic resources ==
- The Differences between the sexes. Short, R. V. (Roger Valentine), 1930-, Balaban, E. (Evan), International Conference on Comparative Physiology (11th : 1992 : Crans, Switzerland). Cambridge: Cambridge University Press. 1994. ISBN 0-521-44411-X. OCLC 28708379.
- Plavcan, J. Michael (2001). "Sexual dimorphism in primate evolution". American Journal of Physical Anthropology. 116 (S33): 25–53. doi:10.1002/ajpa.10011. ISSN 0002-9483.
- Larsen, C. S. "Equality for the Sexes in Human Evolution? Early Hominid Sexual Dimorphism and Implications for Mating Systems and Social Behavior." Proceedings of the National Academy of Sciences, vol. 100, no. 16, 2003, pp. 9103–9104., doi:10.1073/pnas.1633678100.
- Leigh, Steven R. "Socioecology and the Ontogeny of Sexual Size Dimorphism in Anthropoid Primates." American Journal of Physical Anthropology, vol. 97, no. 4, 1995, pp. 339–356., doi:10.1002/ajpa.1330970402.
- Scaglion, Richard. "On Australopithecine Sexual Dimorphism". Current Anthropology, vol. 19, no. 1, 1978, pp. 153–154., doi:10.1086/202026.
- "Sexual Dimorphism". The American Naturalist, vol. 37, no. 437, 1903, pp. 349–349., doi:10.1086/278295.
