= Ngi =

Gorilla divinity in Central Africa

Ngi or Ngi the Strong, is a gorilla god and one of the gods of the Yaoundé people of Cameroon, son of Zamba, the supreme creator. As his father had made Earth and all its creatures, he was tasked alongside his brothers, N'Kokon (mantis) the wise, Otukut (lizard) the fool, and Wo (chimpanzee) the curious, to create human beings. Each of the brothers made human beings in his own image, which is why humans are the way they are.

The nearby Fang people, holding similar beliefs, also refer to the gorilla as ngi, considering it to be a god of fire. They equate it to a positive force, opposed to the negative represented by the chimpanzee. The gorilla was reputedly the patron of the secret Ngi society, up to the late 19th century.

A fictional cult of the same name in Black Panther: Wakanda Forever was inspired by the worship of Ngi.
