= Vrishakapi =

Spiritual entity in Hinduism

Vrishakapi (Sanskrit: वृषाकपिः, IAST: Vṛṣākapi) is an epithet that is used in Hinduism to describe the gods Surya, Vishnu, Shiva and Indra. But the word first appears in the Rig Veda where is it refers to a friend of the god Indra. The character has been described as a prototype of the later Hanuman. The term itself translates to "virile" or "large" monkey.

== Summary ==
The character first appears in the Rig Veda (verse 10:86) where Indrani, the wife of Indra, complains to Indra about him. She states that Vrishakapi has stolen offerings meant for Indra. However, Indra defends his friend and praises him. The verses end with characters seemingly reconciling.
