= Zamba (god) =

Zamba is the supreme creator figure of the Yaunde peoples of the Cameroons. According to the Yaunde people, he made the Earth and all its creatures except human beings. He left that job to his four sons: Ngi (gorilla) the strong, N'Kokon (mantis) the wise, Otukut (lizard) the fool, and Wo (chimpanzee) the curious. Each made human beings in his own image, which is why humans are the way they are.
