= Kavyamata =

Mother of Hindu sage Shukra

- Texts: Devi Bhagavata Purana, Ramayana
- Gender: Female

Genealogy
- Spouse: Bhrigu
- Children: Shukra

Kavyamata (Sanskrit: काव्यमाता, romanized: Kāvyamātā) is a consort of the rishi Bhrigu In Hinduism. She is the mother of Shukra, the god of the planet Venus and the preceptor of the asuras. She was beheaded by the preserver deity, Vishnu, for protecting the asuras.

== Legend ==
The goddess-centric Devi Bhagavata Purana discusses the legend of this character. Once, the asuras fought a war against the devas and were severely beaten. The asuras rushed to the hermitage of Shukra, while being chased by Vishnu and the devas. None of the men were present at the hermitage when asuras arrived; Shukra and his father were at work. Kavyamata sent all the devas into a state of deep sleep. By her meditative power, Kavyamata petrified Indra, the king of the devas, paralysing him. Vishnu summoned his discus – the Sudarshana Chakra, which sliced off Kavyamata's head. Shukra's father, the great sage Bhrigu, was angered when he returned to his hermitage and cursed Vishnu for his sin of woman-slaughter, causing him to have several births on Earth and endure the agony of birth and death repeatedly to suffer for this act. Bhrigu resurrected Kavyamata by sprinkling holy water from his kamandalu (water pot) and she awoke as if from a deep sleep.

== Woman-slaughter ==
Although woman-slaughter is considered adharma in Hinduism, in the great epic Ramayana, the god Rama – an avatar of Vishnu – is convinced by his guru Vishvamitra to kill the yakshini Tataka, as it was according to dharma. To convince his pupil, the sage narrates the story of Kavyamata, who was plotting to "appropriate herself to the dominions of Indra" and was killed by Vishnu, implying that treacherous and wicked persons could be punished as per the dharma of the king, regardless of gender.
