= Jayanti (Hinduism) =

Daughter of Indra in Hinduism

- Affiliation: Devi
- Abode: Patala

Genealogy
- Parents: Indra (father); Shachi (mother)
- Siblings: Jayanta
- Consort: Shukra
- Children: Devayani

Jayanti (Sanskrit: जयन्ती, lit. 'Victory', IAST: Jayantī) is a character in Hindu mythology. She is the daughter of Indra, the king of the devas and the ruler of Svarga, and his consort, Shachi.

Jayanti is described as the wife of Shukra, the god of the planet Venus and the guru of the asuras. Their union results in the birth of a daughter, Devayani. Jayanti is also described as the sister of Jayanta.

== Literature ==
Jayanti appears primarily in the description of one event, the tale of her marriage with Shukra. The tale is retold in many Hindu scriptures with some variations as per the interpretations. The texts include the Vayu Purana, the Matsya Purana, the Brahmanda Purana, the Devi Bhagavata Purana, and the Padma Purana.

== Legend ==
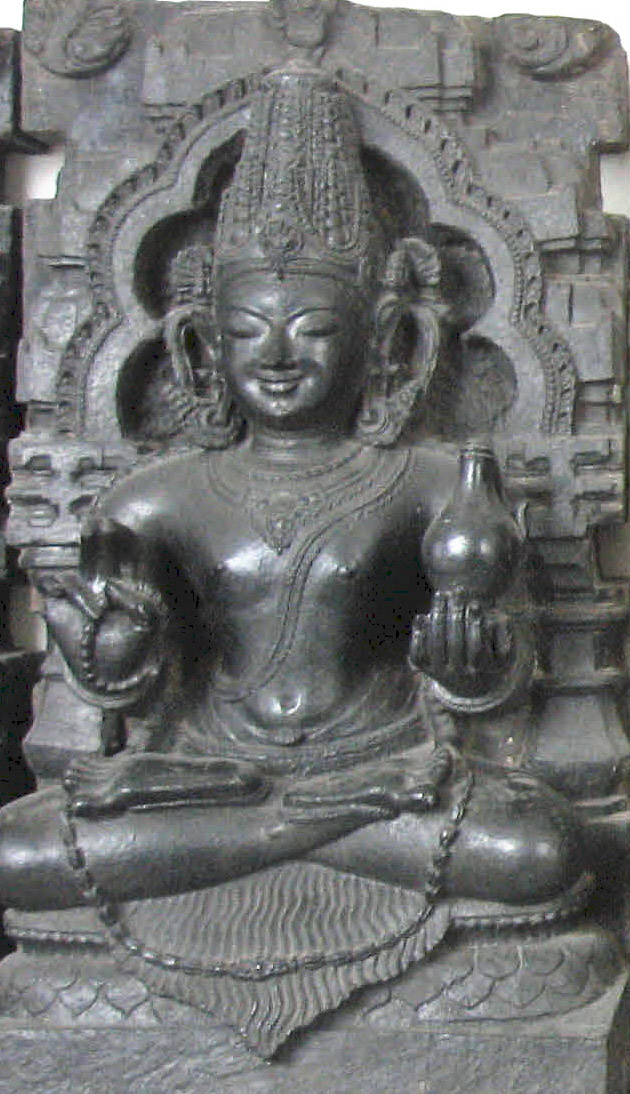
Shukra, the husband of Jayanti

The Matsya Purana narrates that the asuras were almost decimated in battle with the devas. Their guru, Shukra, goes to Mount Kailash to please the god Shiva and acquire new powers to revive the asuras from doom. Shukra performs severe tapas (austerities). The devas try to destroy the remaining asuras and their refuge by Shukra's mother, Kavyamata. But after the murdered Kavyamata is resurrected, Indra, the king of the devas, becomes worried that with Shukra's success the asuras will regroup and attack again. He sends his daughter Jayanti to serve Shukra and to do anything possible to the advantage of Indra.

In the Devi Bhagavata Purana, Indra orders Jayanti to entice the sage to disturb his austerities. Jayanti is displeased with her father's methods, but still goes to Kailash to honour his orders. At Kailash, she becomes an attendant of Shukra and serves him faithfully. She fans him with a banana leaf, gathers cool fragrant water for him to drink, and collects fresh flowers and darbha grass for his worship. She also stands in the heat and uses her upper garment to offer shade to the sage. She prepares a warm bed for him to sleep in and fans him until he falls asleep. She also speaks sweet words to please the sage. She serves him like a dutiful disciple and disregards her father's instructions to break Shukra's penance.

In the Matsya Purana, Jayanti follows her father's orders. After a thousand years, Shiva appears before Shukra and grants him the powers he desired. A pleased Shukra talks to Jayanti and promises to grant her a reward for her services. On her request, he marries her and spends time with her for ten years. Shukra creates a shell of magic so that they become invisible to the world and remain undisturbed. In other versions, Jayanti requests Shukra to create a haze around them so their lovemaking is hidden from the world. The Padma Purana extends the period to a hundred years, instead of ten.

After ten years, Shukra is free from his promise and Jayanti allows him to go visit his disciples, the demons. The Matsya Purana and the Brahmanda Purana relate that couple's union produces a daughter called Devayani. The Hindu epic Mahabharata, which recalls a detailed account of Devayani's life, mentions that she is the daughter of Jayanti. However, the Devi Bhagavata Purana disagrees and portrays her as a daughter of Urjjasvati, another wife of Shukra.

== Beyond the Indian subcontinent and Hinduism ==
She is known as Kimira Devi (Khmer: កិមិរាទេវី) in Cambodia as the wife of Lord Shukra From the Hinduism culture passed down from the Khmer Empire and is the protective goddess of Friday, worshipped during the Cambodian New Year festival if the first day of the year falls on a Friday according to the Cambodian calendar (Khmer: ពិធីផ្ទេរតំណែងទេវតាឆ្នាំថ្មី), as she is believed to descend from heaven to care for the people of this land for one year until the following New Year. In her journey there are some special details that are local and mixed with have Cambodia folk culture Unique, such as the vehicle is a buffalo. It appears with only two hands and has the following symbol as harp and Khanda, The color of her clothes is Blue and Her story and details have been adapted and blended with influences Cambodia buddhism and has its own unique identity.
