= Shukra =

Hindu god of the planet Venus

- Presiding-deity of the planet Venus Preceptor of the Asuras
- Member of Navagraha
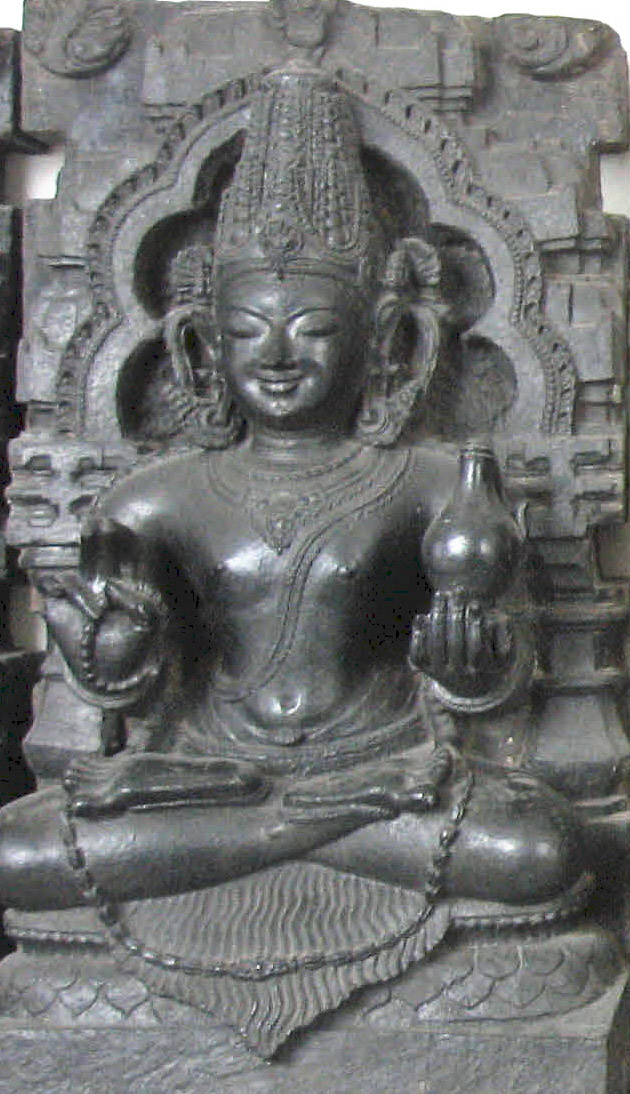
- A 13th-century sculpture of Shukra from Odisha, currently at the British Museum
- Other names: Kavya Ushanas (in the Vedas); Shukracharya, Ushanas, Kavya, Bhargava (in Itihasa-Puranas)
- Devanagari: शुक्र
- Affiliation: Rishi, Devas, Asuras, Grahas
- Planet: Venus
- Mantra: Om drāṃ drīṃ drauṃ saḥ śukrāya namaḥa; Om shuṃ śukrāya namaḥa
- Day: Friday
- Color: White
- Number: 6, 15, 24
- Mount: White Horse

Genealogy
- Parents: Bhrigu (father); Kavyamata (mother)
- Consort: Urjjasvati (chief-consort), Jayanti and Sataparva
- Children: Daughters: Devayani, Araja, Jyestha (wife of Varuna) Sons: Chanda, Amarka, Dharatra, Tvasthadhar

Shukra (/ˈʃuːkrə/ SHOO-krə; Sanskrit: शुक्र, lit. 'clear' or 'bright', IAST: Śukra), also known as Ushanas and Kavya, is a mythological sage as well as the presiding god of the planet Venus in Hinduism. In the Rigveda (c. 1500 BCE), however, Kavya Ushanas appears as a wise poet-priest associated with the gods, especially their king Indra, whom he helped defeat his enemies. The Brahmanas consistently portray him as the purohita (priest/advisor) of the asuras who ultimately deserts them to join the devas. In the post-Vedic period, particularly in the epics (c. 400 BCE – 400 CE) and the Puranic texts (c. 300 CE – 1200 CE), Kavya Ushanas evolves into the figure of seer-sage Ushanas, better known by the epithet Shukracharya. He is first portrayed as the teacher of both the devas (gods) and the asuras (antigods) in earlier texts, before becoming established solely as the purohita of the asuras in later texts. He becomes associated with Venus and is most famous for possessing the Mṛtasañjīvanī—a magical skill that can bring the dead back to life. During the early medieval period (5th–12th century CE), with the rise of anthropomorphic depictions of the Navagrahas of Hindu astrology, the planet Venus was personified with a distinctive iconography: he is shown as youthful man with a white complexion, riding a white horse, and holding a kamandalu (water pot). This iconographic form may or may not be identified with the sage Shukracharya.

== Vedic texts ==
The figure later known as Shukra appears in the Vedic corpus primarily under the name Kavya Ushanas. He is considered by scholars to be the Vedic equivalent of Kay Kāvus in Zoroastrian texts. He is mentioned only a few times in the Rigveda, where he is portrayed as a wise seer (kavi) endowed with exceptional insight rather than as the preceptor of the asuras familiar from later Hindu literature. Neither is there any attestation made to suggest that belonged to the Bhrigu clan nor his association with the planet Venus.

Several Rigvedic passages (RV 5.29.9, 10.22.6, 1.51.11 and 5.31.8) recount a meeting between Indra, accompanied by Kutsa and the gods, and Ushanas Kavya. These hymns portray Indra seeking his assistance before defeating the asura Shushna. Other hymns credit Ushanas with providing or fashioning Indra's vajra (thunderbolt), the weapon that later becomes Indra's defining attribute; though Tvashta is also referred to as Vajra's fashioner. RV 9.87.3 further attributes to him the discovery of the "secret name of the cows". The hymn RV 5.20.11 suggests that Indra might have rewarded Ushanas for aiding him.

The Taittiriya Samhita (2.5.8.5) states that while Agni served as the messenger of the devas, Usana was the messenger of the asuras. The Tandya Mahabrahmana (Panchavimsha Brahmana) expands this tradition by recounting that the devas won over Ushana with kamadughas ("wish-fulfilling" ritual formulae or gifts), after which he revealed aushanasas, the vulnerabilities of the asuras. Another passage of the same text describes Ushana acquiring these sacred formulae through penance and thereby obtaining whatever he desired. The most detailed account occurs in the Jaiminiya Brahmana (1.125–127). It narrates that the prolonged struggle between the devas and the asuras remained indecisive because Brihaspati and Ushana, serving as the respective priests of the two sides, possessed equal ritual power. Indra eventually learned that victory depended upon persuading one of the rival priests to change allegiance. After being enticed with gifts and honours, Ushana abandoned the asuras and joined the devas, providing them with strategic counsel and the ausanasas, thereby ensuring their triumph. Some scholars consider this "aushanasas" as the "secret of cattles" mentioned in the Rigveda.

== Epics and Puranas ==
While the Vedic texts primarily refer to the figure as Ushanas Kavya, later Sanskrit literature introduces Shukra and Bhargava (lit. 'descendant of Bhrigu') serving as common epithets for the sage named Ushanas. As a result, the names Ushanas, Kavya, Shukra and Bhargava came to be treated as referring to the same individual in the later tradition. Some scholars believe this is result of syncretism of Ushanas-Kavya of the Vedas with Ushanas-Shukra, who is possibly a legendary priest of the Bhargava clan, serving the kingdoms which were dubbed "asuras", "rakshasas" and "daityas", opposing the Angirasas clan. In these texts, Ushanas is considered the proper name, with Kavya and Bhargava being patronymics and Shukra an epithet which he receives later in his life.

Ushanas is mentioned as the son (or grandson in some texts) of the sage Bhrigu, one of the seven revered sages originating from the creator god Brahma. His mother is called Kavyamata (lit. 'mother of Kavya'). His role as the purohita is firmly established in these texts. However, his allegiance is not consistently portrayed in the epics and early Puranas. The Mahabharata mentions that Ushanas divided himself into two halves: one became the source of knowledge for the devas (gods), and the other for the asuras (demons). The Vishnu Purana depicts him in alliance with both the devas and the asuras. By the time of the later Puranas, however, his role as the priest and preceptor of the asuras is firmly concretised.

Ushanas is regarded as scion of his clan, noted as a renowned yogi endowed with extraordinary magical powers (siddhi). According to the Shanti Parva of the Mahabharata, he used these powers to enter Kubera, lord of the yakshas and ruler of Alaka, depriving him of both his wealth and freedom. Kubera appealed to Shiva, who, enraged, seized his trident. Perceiving the danger, Ushanas used his yogic powers to position himself upon its tip. Shiva bent the trident with his hand, giving rise to his bow, Pinaka, then swallowed Ushanas. Shiva entered the waters, where he remained absorbed in austerities for millions of years, while Ushanas, residing within his body, had grown in power through the ascetic energy it generated. After completing Shiva's penance, Ushanas, seeking release, wandered within Shiva's body, singing hymns in his praise. Shiva had sealed all bodily openings except the seminal passage and instructed him to emerge through it. For this reason, Ushanas came to be known as Shukra, a name signifying both "bright" and "semen." Witnessing Shukra emerge radiant with the power accumulated through his penance, Shiva became enraged and sought to destroy him. His wife, Uma, intervened, however, and Shiva relented, allowing Shukra to continue on his destined course. In this version of the narrative, Shukra is also regarded as a son of Uma. Variants of this myth exist in different Puranas. In the Shiva Purana, Shiva swallows Shukra during a war between the gods and the asura Andhaka to prevent Shukra from reviving the dead army of the asuras. In this narrative, Shukra emerges out Shiva's body as his semen without Shiva's guidance and Shiva, who is amused, blesses him instead of trying to kill him.

Shukra, in the Puranas, is blessed by Shiva with Sanjeevini Vidhya after performing tapas to propitiate Shiva. Sanjeevini Vidhya is the knowledge of raising the dead back to life, which he used from time to time to restore life to the asuras. Later, this knowledge was sought by the devas and was ultimately gained by them.

Vamana, the dwarf avatar of Vishnu, requests the asura king Mahabali for three steps of land. Mahabali acceded to the request and as was the practice, took up the kamandalu to pour water to symbolically signify the donation to Vamana. When Shukra, the asuras' guru, had realised Vamana's true identity, he tried to prevent the flow of water from the kamandalu by blocking the spout, Vamana pierced the spout with a stick, blinded Shukra.

Shukra's mother was Kavyamata, whilst Shukra's wives were the goddesses Urjasvati, Jayanti, and Sataparva. Sometimes, Urjjasvati and Jayanti are considered to be one goddess. With her, Shukra produced many children, including Queen Devayani. Sataparva was childless.

In the Mahabharata, Shukracharya is mentioned as one of the mentors of Bhishma, having taught him political science in his youth.

== Astrology ==
In classical Vedic astrology or Jyotisha, Shukra is considered to be among the Navagrahas (Nine planets) that influence the pattern of life on earth. Shukra represents women, beauty, wealth, luxury, and sex. According to classical astrological texts, a powerfully placed Shukra, aspected by benefic planets such as Jupiter, and in favourable signs and houses in the birth chart, ensures material well-being. Its beej mantra is "Om Draam Dreem Draum Sah Shukraya Namaha". It is associated with Friday, and the gem diamond. The classical shastras ordain that the best method to attain the blessings of Shukra is to respect the women in one’s life.

It is also popularly propitiated through Devi Aradhana or worshipping the goddess Lakshmi.

== Planet ==
Shukra as a planet appears in various Hindu astronomical texts in Sanskrit, such as the 5th century Aryabhatiya by Aryabhatta, the 6th century Romaka by Latadeva and Panca Siddhantika by Varahamihira, the 7th century Khandakhadyaka by Brahmagupta and the 8th century Sisyadhivrddida by Lalla. These texts present Shukra as one of the planets and estimate the characteristics of the respective planetary motion. Other texts such as Surya Siddhanta dated to have been complete sometime between the 5th century and 10th century present their chapters on various planets with deity mythologies.

The manuscripts of these texts exist in slightly different versions, present Shukra's motion in the skies, but vary in their data, suggesting that the text were open and revised over their lives.

The 1st millennium CE Hindu scholars had estimated the time it took for sidereal revolutions of each planet including Shukra, from their astronomical studies, with slightly different results:

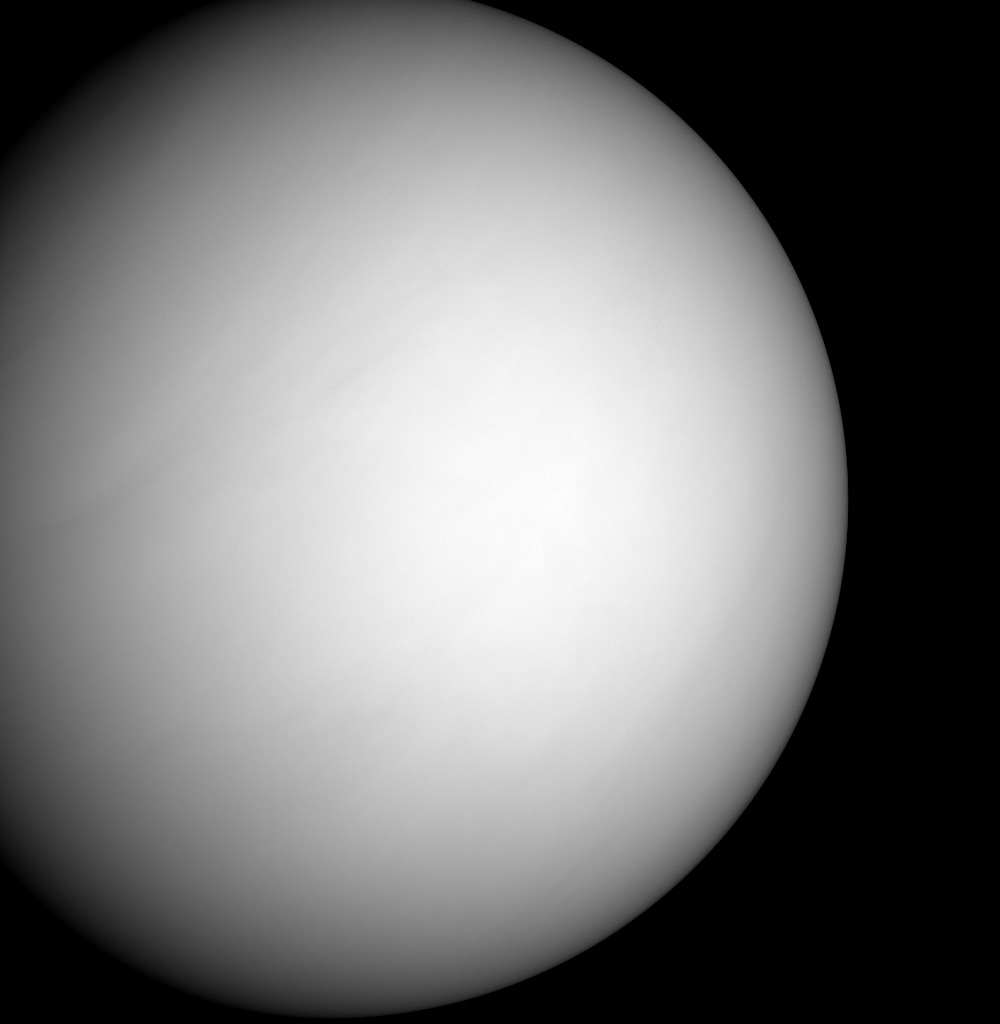
The planet Venus

Sanskrit texts: How many days for Shukra (Venus) to complete its orbit?
Source	Estimated time per sidereal revolution
Surya Siddhanta	224 days, 16 hours, 45 minutes, 56.2 seconds
Siddhanta Shiromani	224 days, 16 hours, 45 minutes, 1.9 seconds
Ptolemy	224 days, 16 hours, 51 minutes, 56.8 seconds
20th century calculations	224 days, 16 hours, 49 minutes, 8.0 seconds

== Calendar and zodiac ==
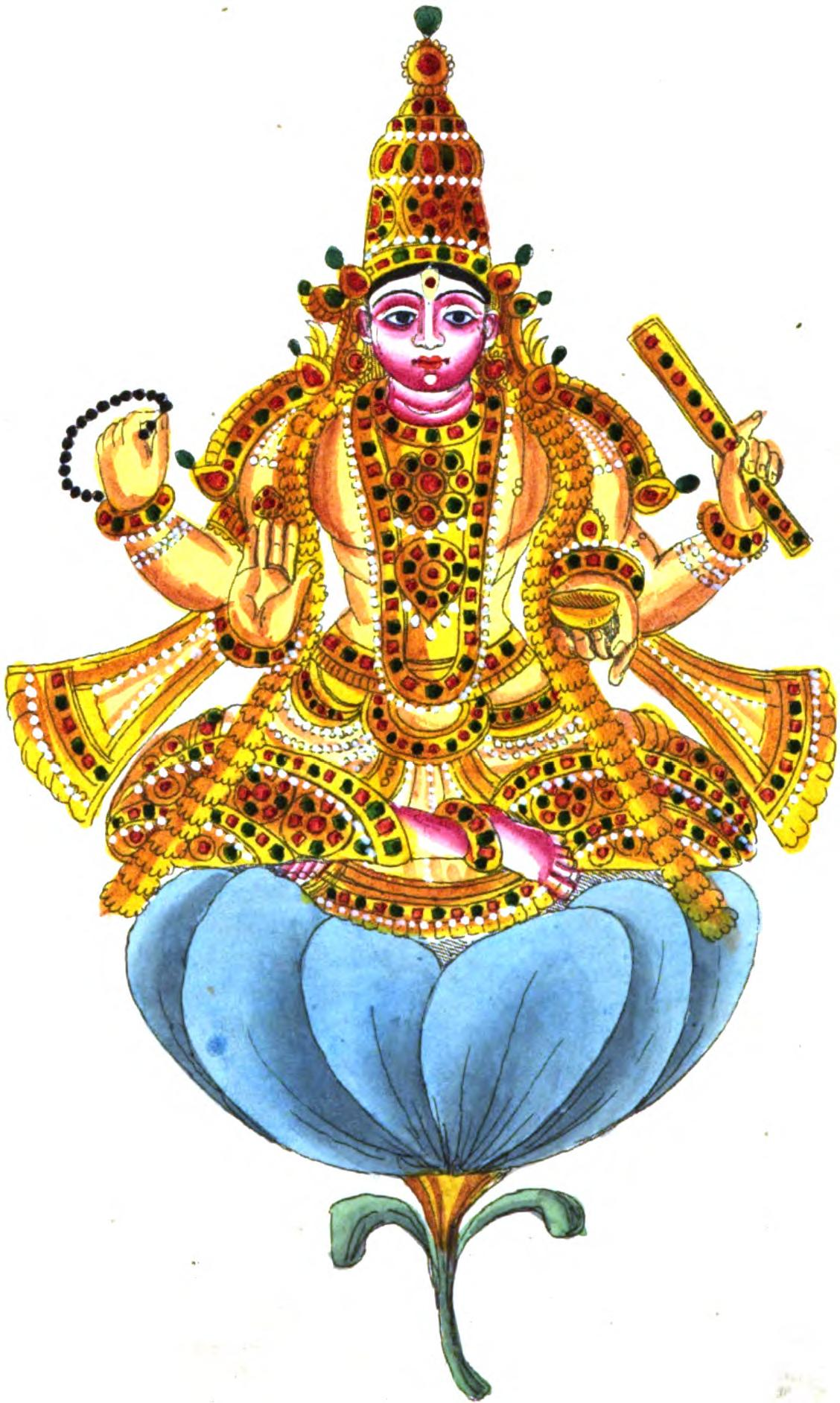
Depiction of Shukra from the 1842 book The Complete Hindoo Pantheon by E. A. Rodrigues

The weekday Shukravara in Hindu calendar, or Friday, has roots in Shukra (Venus). Shukravara is found in most Indian languages, and Shukra Graha is driven by the planet Venus in Hindu astrology. The word "Friday" in the Greco-Roman and other Indo-European calendars is also based on the planet Venus.

Shukra is a part of the Navagraha in the Hindu zodiac system. The Navagraha developed from early works of astrology over time. Deifying planetary bodies and their astrological significance occurred as early as the Vedic period and was recorded in the Vedas. The classical planets, including Venus, were referenced in the Atharvaveda around 1000 BCE. The planet Venus was deified and referred to as Shukra in various Puranas.

== See also ==
- Varuna
- Venus (astrology)
- Venus (mythology)
- Navagraha
  - List of Navagraha temples
- Nakshatra
  - List of Natchathara temples
  - Jyotisha
  - Saptarishi
- List of Hindu deities
- Vishnu
