= Indra Vila =

Historical Tamil Hindu festival

- Official name: Indra Vila
- Also called: Indra Vizha
- Observed by: At Tamils, Cholas, Pandyas
- Type: Religious, Agricultural
- Significance: Festival honoring Indra, deity of rain and harvest
- Celebrations: Processions, drum ceremonies, state festivities
- Observances: Rain prayers, agricultural rituals
- Date: Month of Chaitra (historical)
- Duration: 27 days (historical)
- Frequency: Annual (historical)
- Related to: Bhogi, Pongal

Indra Vila (Tamil: இந்திர விழா, romanized: Indra Viḻā, lit. 'Festival of Indra'), sometimes rendered Indra Vizha, was a historical Hindu festival that was celebrated in Tamilakam during the Sangam period (2nd century BCE – 3rd century CE). It was celebrated in honour of Vendhan (Indra), the deity associated with the Marutham landscape.

== History ==
The Cholas celebrated the festival at Kaveripattinam, whereas the Pandyas celebrated the festival at Madurai. The festival is mentioned in the ancient Tamil epics of Cilappatikaram and Manimekalai. During the reign of the Cholas and the Pandyas, it was celebrated as a state festival, recognised and conducted by these royal regimes. Both of these epics state that the festival of Indra was celebrated with great pomp at Kaveripattinam by the Chola king, called the, "festival of the thousand-eyed one". The commencement of the festival, called the Vila Kalkol, was proclaimed by the beat of drums, placed on the back on an elephant.

== Legend ==
According to Manimekalai, the legendary sage, Agastya, helped the people of Kaveripattinam during a period of drought. He advised the Chola king, Todittol Sembian, to celebrate a festival for Indra to please him, so that the deity may bring rain to this city. Heeding this counsel, the king arranged a big festival for Indra. In return, they received rainfall in the city, and the prosperity associated with it, and hence his successors continued to celebrate this festival every year, for 27 days during the month of Chaitra. According to another legend, once, a Chola king named Nedumkilli could not celebrate the Indra Vila festival. As a consequence to this, the wrath of the deity fell on the kingdom and the king: The sea engulfed the famous port city of Kaveripattinam, and all the inhabitants of the city suffered.

In the contemporary period, the festivities associated with the agricultural Indra Vila are primarily associated with the occasion of Bhogi Pongal, the day dedicated to Indra, and preserving all the elements of the seasonal festival. Locally, the Indra Vila is conducted at the Kamatchi Amman temple at the Kallimadai locality near Singanallur in Coimbatore every year. The Venkudai (White umbrella) festival, depicting the white umbrella and the Airavata of Indra, is conducted every year at Rajapalayam, in commemoration of the ancient Indra Vila.

The Seedling planting festival has been celebrated by the farming community along the banks of Noyyal River. The festival is conducted in the month of Aani. The ritual forms a part of Indra festival. The festival has its reference from the "Perur Puranam" by Kachiappa Munivar.

== See also ==
- Pongal
- Sankranti
