= Jayanta =

Son of Hindu god Indra

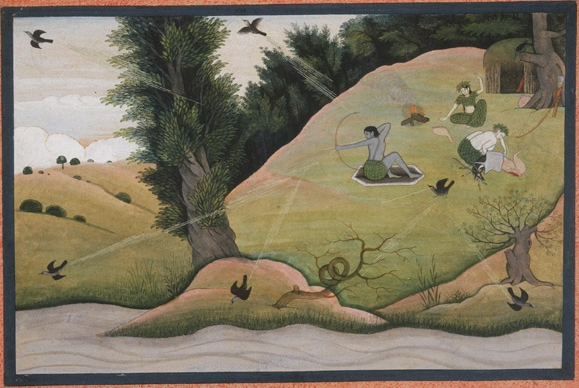
- Jayanta, as a crow, is attacked by Rama
- Affiliation: Deva
- Abode: Svarga
- Texts: Ramayana, Bhagavata Purana
- Gender: Male

Genealogy
- Parents: Indra (father); Shachi (mother)
- Siblings: Rishabha, Midhusha, Jayanti

Jayanta (Sanskrit: जयन्त, lit. '"victory"')), is a character who appears in Hindu literature. He is the son of Indra, the king of the devas (gods), and his wife, Shachi (Indrani). He has a sister called Jayanti.

He appears in various Hindu scriptures, fighting in wars on behalf of the devas. Jayanta also appears in the epic Ramayana and other lore, in which he disguises himself as a crow.

== Legends ==
=== Crow form ===
In the Sundara Kanda (the fifth Book of the epic Ramayana), when Hanuman meets Sita, she narrates an incident that happened in the forest in Chitrakuta. The prince of Ayodhya and an avatar of the god Vishnu, Rama, is exiled to the forest with his wife Sita (an avatar of Vishnu's wife, Lakshmi) and his brother, Lakshmana. A fatigued Rama was sleeping in the lap of Sita, when a crow attacked her. The crow pecks at her twice; once on her breast or between her breasts in some versions.

The Ramcharitmanas replaces the breast with feet. In a hurry to drive away the crow, she tries to fasten her garments, but ends up loosening them. Rama is awakened and recognises the crow, whose claws were dripping in blood, as the son of Indra. An enraged Rama, at the behest of Sita, picks a blade of grass and unleashes the divine weapon Brahmastra out of it on the crow, who flees in fear. The crow flies across the universe, but the weapon follows. Turned back by Indra, Brahma, Shiva, and various rishis (sages), the crow takes refuge in Rama, and surrenders to him. The son of Indra requests pardon, but Rama says that the Brahmastra cannot be withdrawn. So, the son of Indra asks it to hit the crow's right eye, and he is left half-blind. While Jayanta is not explicitly named in the episode, various commentaries on the epic like the Tilaka and the Bhushana by Govindaraja identify Jayanta as the "son of Indra"; some other commentaries do not identify any individual son of Indra. Govindaraja remarks only Jayanta is known as the son of Indra.

Besides the Ramayana, Jayanta is said to have assumed the form of the crow in some versions of the Samudra Manthana episode. A pot of amrita (elixir of life) emerged from the churning of the ocean by the devas and the asuras. The asuras seized the pot, but Jayanta took it from them in the guise of a crow. Pursued by the asuras, he is regarded to have flown for twelve days without rest. He stopped at four locations on Earth: Prayaga (in modern Prayagraj), Haridwar, Ujjain, and Nashik, where the Kumbha Mela is celebrated every twelve years in remembrance of the incident.

=== Deva warrior ===
The Uttara Kanda, the final book of the Ramayana, describes a battle between Indra and the rakshasa king Ravana. While Indra battles Ravana, Jayanta fights with Ravana's son, Meghanada. A fierce battle ensues between Jayanta and Meghanada; ultimately Ravana's son strikes Jayanta, who falls unconscious. In the confusion, Puloman, his maternal grandfather, takes Jayanta away from the battlefield, unseen by anyone and hides him in the ocean. Indra presumes Jayanta dead, and fights more powerfully, but Meghanada defeats him too.

Jayanta is also described to fight in the battle between the devas and asuras in the Padma Purana.

The Harivamsa mentions a battle between Indra and the god Krishna to acquire the celestial tree, Pārijātapuṣpa, from Indra's realm. Jayanta is described battling Krishna's son Pradyumna, and is defeated.

In the Skanda Purana, Jayanta is defeated by the asura Surapadman, who is finally killed by the commander-in-chief of the devas, Skanda.

=== Bamboo curse ===
The Vayu Purana narrates a tale wherein Jayanta is cursed and turned into a bamboo. This tale is also told in context of devadasi lore, with some variations. Once, the sage Agastya arrived in Indra's court, and was welcomed by Indra, organising a dance performance of the apsara Urvashi. In the performance, Urvashi and Jayanta looked into each other's eyes in love. The distracted Urvashi missed a beat, and the dance went haywire. An agitated Agastya cursed Urvashi to be born on earth as a devadasi, and Jayanta to become a bamboo tree in the Vindhya mountains. The duo bowed in reverence, and prayed for mercy. The sage said that the curse would end when Urvashi is presented with a talaikole (a bamboo staff, Jayanta) on her dance debut (Arangetram). As ordained, the lovers were released from the curse and returned to Svarga, where Urvashi got united with Jayanta as the bamboo staff.

== Notes ==
- Goldman, Robert P.; Goldman, Sally J. Sutherland (1996). The Ramayana Of Valmiki: Sundarakāṇḍa. The Ramayana Of Valmiki: An Epic Of Ancient India. Vol. V. Princeton University Press. ISBN 0-691-06662-0.
