= Kamandalu =

Type of pot from the Indian subcontinent

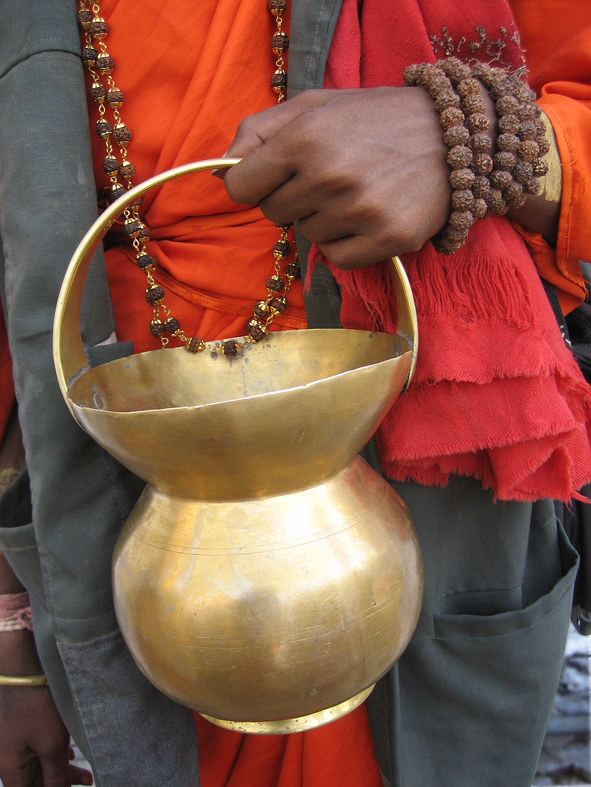
A brass kamaṇḍalu, held by a sadhu.

Kamandalu (Sanskrit: kamaṇḍalu) is an oblong water pot, originating from the Indian subcontinent, made of a dry gourd (pumpkin) or coconut shell, metal, wood of the kamaṇḍalataru tree, or from clay, usually with a handle and sometimes with a spout. Hindu ascetics or yogis often use it for storing drinking water. The water-filled kamaṇḍalu, which is invariably carried by ascetics, is stated to represent a simple and self-contained life.

The kamaṇḍalu also appears in Hindu iconography in depictions of deities associated with asceticism or water. It is thus regarded as a symbol of asceticism in Hinduism. The kamaṇḍalu is also used by Jain monks and in depictions of some bodhisattvas.

== Method of making ==
The kamaṇḍalu may be made of various materials, including metal, clay, wood and dry gourd. For making the gourd kamaṇḍalu, a ripe pumpkin is plucked and the inner plum and seeds are cleaned. This leaves only the outer shell, which is used as the kamaṇḍalu. This is interpreted on a spiritual level as the removal of ego from a person. The ripe pumpkin represents the person, seed being the ego. Cleaning the seed thus symbolizes the removal of ego, forming a cleansed person fit to accept self-realization.

== In Hinduism ==
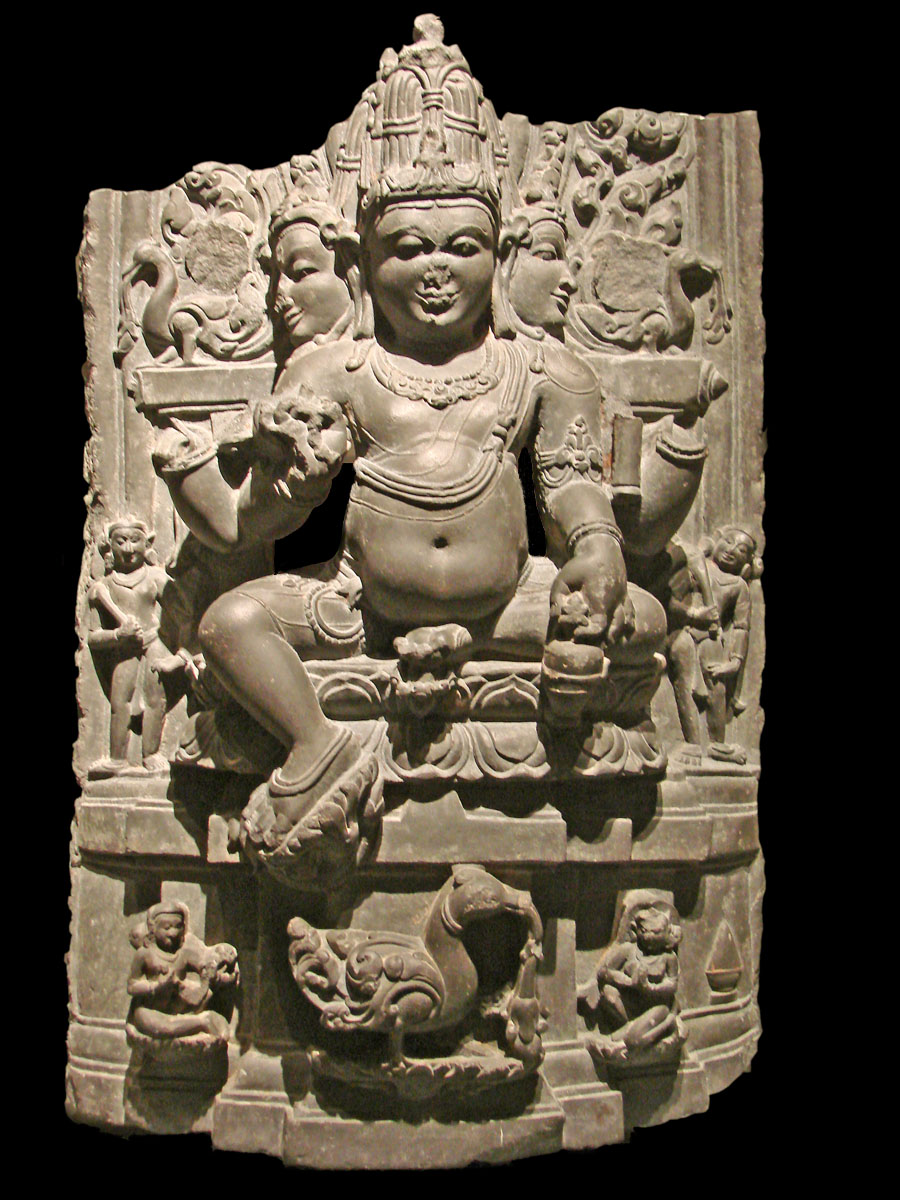
Brahma holding a kamaṇḍalu in his right hand

Water in a kamaṇḍalu represents amrita—the elixir of life—thus a symbol of fertility, life and wealth. The kamaṇḍalu is often depicted in hands of gods, who appear as ascetics, like Shiva and Brahma and also water deities like Varuna, Ganga (the goddess of the Ganges river) and Saraswati. Adi Shankara's ashtotaram hymn praises Shiva whose hand is adorned with the kamaṇḍalu. Other deities, such as the fire-god Agni and the preceptor of the gods, Brihaspati, are depicted carrying the kamaṇḍalu. The goddess Karamgamaladharini is described as wearing a garland of kamaṇḍalus. The text Devi Mahatmya describes goddess Brahmani slay demons by sprinkling holy water from her kamaṇḍalu. A 183–165 BC coin depicts the god Krishna holding a kamaṇḍalu.

Several mythological stories refer to the kamaṇḍalu. Vamana the dwarf avatar of god Vishnu, requests demon king Mahabali for three feet of land. The donation of the land is sanctified through pouring water through a kamaṇḍalu. When Shukra, the demons' preceptor, tried to prevent the flow of water from the kamaṇḍalu by blocking the spout, Mahabali pierced the spout with a stick, which blinded Shukra. In the Bhagavata Purana, the King Satyavarta after initially put Matsya (Vishnu's avatar as a fish), which he found in the river, into his kamaṇḍalu, to protect it from the big fish. Later, the fish expanded and protected the king from the great deluge of Hindu mythology. The Mahabharata records the god Dhanvantari brought Amrita in a kamaṇḍalu, when he emerged from the churning of the ocean (Samudra Manthana). The Hindu epic Ramayana records the monkey-god Hanuman disguised himself as a sage and fooled the demons into drinking his urine stored in his kamaṇḍalu.

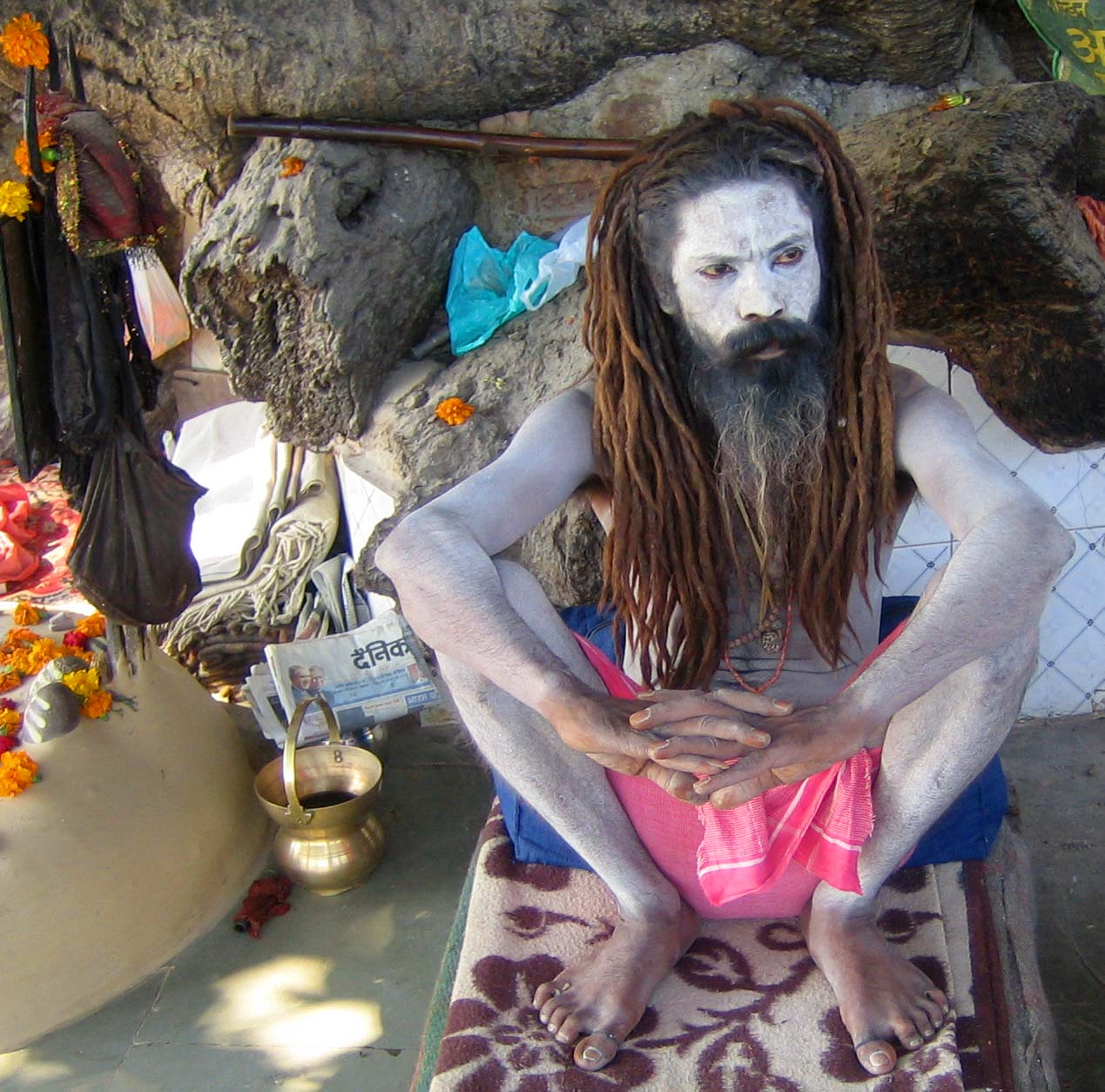
A sadhu (ascetic) with a kamaṇḍalu to his right

The mythical Sarasvati river traces her creation legends to the creator-god Brahma's kamaṇḍalu. The river Ganges is also believed to flow through Brahma's kamaṇḍalu. One legend about the Ganges' birth says Brahma washed the big toe of the foot of Vamana and collected the water in his kamaṇḍalu, which turned into the river Ganges.

Another river, Silambu, has a similar origin. When Brahma washed Vamana's foot by the water of his kamaṇḍalu, one of the drops fell from Vamana's foot on the earth, turning into the river. Another mythical tale about the pilgrimage place Darsha Pushkarini narrates how sage Agastya trapped the river Kaveri in his kamaṇḍalu when she declined his marriage proposal. This led to famine in the region. Upon noticing this, Kaveri escaped from the kamaṇḍalu but was cursed by the sage and was finally purified at Darśa Puṣkaraṇi. A variant tells that, angered by Kaveri's confinement, god Ganesha, in the form of a crow, pushed Agastya's kamaṇḍalu down, rescuing Kaveri and leading to the river's formation.

In the Sarada legends of Kashmir (based on oral tradition) narrated by Romesh Kumar, it is said that when Ravana was engaged in a war with Rama, goddess Parvati advised Rama to take her to Uttarakhand away from the war scene. Thus, Parvati was carried by Hanuman in the form of water in a kamaṇḍalu to be dropped wherever she desired to be dropped. Wherever Hanuman rested on his way to Uttarakhand, drops of water which fell out of the kamaṇḍalu on the ground formed the springs Masanag at Gushi and the Devibal spring at Tikr in Kashmir—the kamaṇḍalu was kept in a nearby hillock where Parvati rested, where there is a Sharada Peeth. At Amarkantak, the source of the Narmada in Madhya Pradesh, an ancient kamaṇḍalu, which is always filled with water, is called the Bhṛgu kamaṇḍalu.

The Garuda Purana states that the donation of a kamaṇḍalu in the śrāddha (funerary ritual) ensures that the deceased has ample drinking water in his afterlife journey.

== In Buddhism and Jainism ==
Buddhists pour water from the kamaṇḍalu onto the palms of people before rituals, where the water symbolizes elixir of life. It is also called bhumba. Bodhisattvas like Maitreya and Avalokiteśvara are depicted carrying the kamaṇḍalu. The kamaṇḍalu was initially imported from Hinduism to Buddhism, through the god Brahma to Maitreya; it later was incorporated in representations of many Mahayana Buddhist deities.

Digambara Jain sages use the kamaṇḍalu for storing water for "toilet purposes".

== See also ==
- Hindu iconography
- Hindu ascetic
- Sadhu
- Asceticism
- Amrita
